= Toyah! Toyah! Toyah! All the Hits =

Compilation album by Toyah
- Released: February 1984
- Recorded: 1979–1983
- Genre: New wave; punk rock
- Label: K-tel
- Producer: Nick Tauber; Steve James; Keith Hale; Steve Lillywhite

Toyah chronology
Love Is the Law (1983)	Toyah! Toyah! Toyah! All the Hits (1984)	Mayhem (1985)

Toyah! Toyah! Toyah! is a greatest hits compilation album by the English new wave band Toyah, fronted by Toyah Willcox, released in 1984 by K-tel. The album is also known as Toyah! Toyah! Toyah! All the Hits by including the cover slogan to differentiate it from the earlier live album Toyah! Toyah! Toyah!.

== Background ==
It was the band's first compilation album to date and covered material from the Sheep Farming in Barnet era through to 1983's Love Is The Law. It consisted of most of Toyah's singles, including all charting singles, as well as non-single tracks. The rare song "Sphinx" was previously only available as a flexi disc included with issue 8 of Flexipop magazine in 1981. The compilation marked the first time that "Good Morning Universe", "Thunder in the Mountains", "Sphinx" and "Be Proud Be Loud (Be Heard)" were included on a full-length album. The record sleeve was designed by Bill Smith. A companion VHS videocassette was also released containing four music videos and a live performance. The album was a moderate chart success in the UK.

== Track listing ==
Side one

1. "I Want to Be Free" (Toyah Willcox, Joel Bogen) – 3:06
2. "Good Morning Universe" (Willcox, Bogen) – 3:27
3. "Rebel Run" (Willcox, Simon Darlow) – 3:10
4. "Angels and Demons" (Willcox, Keith Hale) – 6:15
5. "We Are" (Willcox, Bogen) – 3:08
6. "Race Through Space" (Willcox, Bogen, Peter Bush) – 3:10
7. "The Angel and Me" (Willcox, Bogen) – 4:31
8. "Thunder in the Mountains" (Willcox, Adrian Lee, Nigel Glockler) – 3:36

Side two

9. "It's a Mystery" (Hale) – 4:00
10. "Brave New World" (Willcox, Bogen) – 3:30
11. "Neon Womb" (Willcox, Bogen, Bush) – 3:49
12. "Sphinx" (Willcox, Bogen) – 3:11
13. "Be Proud Be Loud (Be Heard)" (Willcox, Bogen) – 3:20
14. "The Vow" (Willcox, Bogen, Phil Spalding) – 3:44
15. "Danced" (Willcox, Bogen, Bush) – 5:06
16. "Ieya" (New Version) (Willcox, Bogen, Bush) – 3:34

== Personnel ==
- Toyah Willcox – vocals
- Joel Bogen – guitar
- Phil Spalding – bass
- Brad Lang – bass
- Mark Henry – bass
- Peter Bush – keyboards
- Adrian Lee – keyboards
- Simon Darlow – keyboards
- Steve Bray – drums
- Nigel Glockler – drums
- Simon Phillips – drums
- Andy Duncan – drums

== Charts ==
Chart (1984)	Peak position
UK Albums (Official Charts Company)	43
