= Anthem (Toyah album) =

Studio album by Toyah
- Released: May 1981
- Studio: Marquee Studios, London
- Genre: New wave
- Length: 41:42 (original release); 64:23 (1999 CD re-release)
- Label: Safari
- Producer: Nick Tauber

Toyah chronology
Toyah! Toyah! Toyah! (1980)	Anthem (1981)	The Changeling (1982)

Singles from Anthem
- 1. "It's a Mystery" Released: 1981; 2. "I Want to Be Free" Released: May 1981

Professional ratings
Review scores
Source	Rating
Melody Maker	(favourable)

Anthem is the third studio album by the English new wave band Toyah, fronted by Toyah Willcox, released in 1981 by Safari Records. It was the band's most successful album, reaching number two in the UK Albums Chart and featuring the top-ten singles "It's a Mystery" and "I Want to Be Free". The album was certified gold in 1981 for selling more than 100,000 copies in the UK.

== Background ==
Anthem was the band's first full-length album recorded with the new lineup which consisted of Willcox, Joel Bogen, Phil Spalding, Nigel Glockler and Adrian Lee. The material was recorded at the Marquee Studios in London and produced by Nick Tauber.

The album cover features a painting by Steve Weston which presents Toyah as a female fairy with wings, carrying the head of a decapitated male humanoid, with pyramids and smoke in the background. The singer explained that it refers to the theme of strength and domination, and that it was inspired by science fiction works of such authors as J. R. R. Tolkien and Philip K. Dick. Original vinyl issues of the album came complete with a colour insert featuring photographs of the band wrapped in bandages, with various exposed body parts sprayed gold, and Egyptian themed drawings across the lyrics pages. A picture disc variation, featuring the album's front and back artwork and no sleeve, was also issued at the time.

== Lyrical content ==
The lyrics of "I Want to Be Free" originated from Toyah's frustration as a dyslectic teenager during her school years. The singer explained that it "resonated how I felt about school years which was still very strongly with me even when I was 22". She further explained that the song is "about seeing the individual, it's about hearing and understanding the individual, not wiping them away from a future just because they can't add up or don't write particularly well. Also, it's about us having the choice".

The song "Elocution Lesson" is based on actual elocution lessons that the singer took during her school years. In relation to "Jungles of Jupiter", Toyah said: "I am absolutely convinced that at some point there was life, as we know it here, on Jupiter. (...) I believe that it's a living planet". She explained that "Masai Boy" refers to the ritual of the Maasai people when "a boy becomes a man" and that it is about "love and respect for the Maasai warriors". She described "Marionette" as "a Game of Thrones version of an anti-Thatcher song", adding that it is "about being played by a politician. We are the puppets, we're being played by the marionette".

== Release and promotion ==
The album was released in May 1981, preceded by the single "I Want to Be Free" earlier that month. "It's a Mystery", which in the UK had been available only as the 7-inch EP Four from Toyah, was released as a separate single to promote Anthem abroad. Toyah embarked on a UK tour in May and June 1981 in support of the album. Anthem entered the UK Albums Chart at number 3, eventually peaking at number 2 and spending forty-six consecutive weeks in the chart. The album was certified gold for selling more than 100,000 units in the UK. It was also a modest chart success in Scandinavia, reaching the Top 40 in Norway and Finland. Anthem remains Toyah's most commercially successful album to date.

Anthem was released in CD format in 1985, adding the three remaining Four from Toyah songs and the non-album single "Thunder in the Mountains" as bonus tracks. It was then re-issued in 1999, again with the Four from Toyah material, B-sides of the single "I Want to Be Free" and its music video, and "For You", a song from the Anthem recording sessions which did not make it onto the original album. It was released on a promotional single given away free with Flexipop magazine in late 1981, together with "Sphinx", also from the sessions for Anthem. The popularity of "Sphinx" meant it found its way onto the 1984 compilation Toyah! Toyah! Toyah!, the 1998 compilation The Best of Toyah: Proud, Loud & Heard as well as the 2002 re-release of The Blue Meaning as a bonus track.

In September 2022, the album was re-released by Cherry Red Records, adding two bonus discs of rare and previously unreleased material, and a DVD with live performances and music videos.

== Track listing ==
=== Original release ===
Side one – Once Upon a Time...

1. "I Want to Be Free" (Toyah Willcox, Joel Bogen) – 3:10
2. "Obsolete" (Willcox, Bogen, Nigel Glockler) – 2:36
3. "Pop Star" (Willcox, Adrian Lee, Glockler) – 3:56
4. "Elocution Lesson" (Willcox, Bogen) – 2:32
5. "Jungles of Jupiter" (Willcox, Bogen, Phil Spalding) – 5:12
6. "I Am" (Willcox, Bogen) – 3:22

Side two – Happy Ever After?

7. "It's a Mystery" (Keith Hale) – 4:08
8. "Masai Boy" (Willcox, Lee, Willcox) – 4:06
9. "Marionette" (Willcox, Bogen) – 5:37
10. "Demolition Men" (Willcox, Lee) – 3:50
11. "We Are" (Willcox, Bogen) – 3:13

1985 CD edition bonus tracks

12. "Revelations" (Bogen, Willcox) – 3:34
13. "War Boys" (Willcox) – 3:39
14. "Angels & Demons" (Willcox, Hale) – 6:55
15. "Thunder in the Mountains" (Willcox, Lee, Glockler) – 3:34

1999 CD edition bonus tracks

12. "Walkie Talkie" (Willcox, Bogen) – 1:59
13. "Alien" (Willcox, Bogen, Glockler) – 3:28
14. "Revelations" (Willcox, Bogen) – 3:34
15. "For You" (Willcox, Bogen) – 3:06
16. "War Boys" (Willcox) – 3:39
17. "Angels & Demons" (Willcox, Hale) – 6:55

"I Want to Be Free" (video)

=== 2022 expanded deluxe edition ===
CD one

1. "I Want to Be Free" – 3:12
2. "Obsolete" – 2:38
3. "Pop Star" – 3:57
4. "Elocution Lesson" – 2:35
5. "Jungles of Jupiter" – 5:15
6. "I Am" – 3:39
7. "It's a Mystery" (Album Mix) – 4:12
8. "Masai Boy" – 4:21
9. "Marionette" – 5:41
10. "Demolition Men" – 3:52
11. "We Are" – 3:17
12. "It's a Mystery" – 4:15
13. "Revelations" – 3:37
14. "War Boys" – 3:38
15. "Angels & Demons" – 6:55
16. "Walkie Talkie" – 2:01
17. "Alien" – 3:26
18. "Sphinx" – 3:18
19. "For You" (Unfaded Version) – 3:36
20. "I Want to Be Free" (Instrumental) – 3:28

CD two

1. "Thunder in the Mountains" – 3:52
2. "Street Addict" – 5:22
3. "Voodoo Doll" – 3:59

Live at Paris Theatre 05-04-1981

4. "War Boys" – 4:52
5. "Neon Womb" – 3:48
6. "Danced" – 5:18
7. "Angels & Demons" – 7:00
8. "It's a Mystery" – 4:36
9. "Ieya" – 7:13

Marquee Studios Dec 1980 – Aug 1981

10. "It's a Mystery" (Extended Instrumental) – 5:35
11. "I Am" (Instrumental) – 3:11
12. "Pop Star" (Instrumental) – 4:02
13. "Jungles of Jupiter" (Instrumental) – 5:20
14. "Joel & Phil" (Instrumental Outtake) – 4:53
15. "Turkish Delight" (Instrumental Outtake) – 4:30
16. "Television" (Instrumental Outtake) – 4:43

CD three – More Rare & Archive Material

1. "It's a Mystery" (Re-recorded TV Version)
2. "Revelations" (Alternate Vocal)
3. "War Boys" (Alternate Mix)
4. "I Want to Be Free" (Alternate Vocal)
5. "I Am" (Acoustic)
6. "Pop Star" (Rough Mix)
7. "Marionette" (Rough Mix)
8. "Demolition Men" (Rough Mix)
9. "Thunder in the Mountains" (Alternate Vocal)
10. "Walkie Talkie" (Instrumental)
11. "Japan" (Instrumental Outtake)
12. "The Door Is a Whore" (Instrumental)
13. "For You" (Instrumental)
14. "Masai Boy" (Instrumental)
15. "Alien" (Instrumental)
16. "Thunder in the Mountains" (Original Instrumental)
17. "Street Addict" (Instrumental)
18. "Voodoo Doll" (Instrumental)
19. "Clapham Junction" (Original Instrumental)
20. "Dropped Earring" (Instrumental)

DVD

1. "Creating Anthem"
2. "Track by Track Commentary"
3. "I Want to Be Free" (Electro/Acoustic 2021)
4. "It's a Mystery" (Electro/Acoustic 2021)
5. "We Are" (Electro/Acoustic 2021)
6. "I Want to Be Free" (Promo Video)
7. "Thunder in the Mountains" (Promo Video)
8. "It's a Mystery" (Top of the Pops 19/02/1981)
9. "It's a Mystery" (Top of the Pops 19/03/1981)
10. "I Want to Be Free" (Top of the Pops 21/05/1981)
11. "Thunder in the Mountains" (Top of the Pops 01/10/1981)
12. "I Want to Be Free" (Cheggers Plays Pop 18/05/1981)
13. "It's a Mystery" (Multi-Coloured Swap Shop 10/10/1981)
14. "Ieya" (Something Else 30/10/1981)
15. "Thunder in the Mountains" (Something Else 30/10/1981)

== Personnel ==
Band members

- Toyah Willcox – vocals
- Joel Bogen – guitar
- Adrian Lee – keyboards
- Phil Spalding – bass
- Nigel Glockler – drums

Production

- Nick Tauber – producer
- Toyah Willcox – arrangements
- Phil Harding – engineer, mixing
- Simon Hanhart, Andy Lovell, Mark Wade, Keith Hale – assistant engineers

== Charts ==
Chart (1981)	Peak position
Australian Albums (Kent Music Report)	68
Finnish Albums	30
Norwegian Albums (VG-lista)	20
UK Albums (Official Charts Company)	2
UK Independent Albums	2

Chart (2022)	Peak position
Scottish Albums	6
UK Albums (Official Charts Company)	33
UK Vinyl Albums	6
UK Independent Albums	1

== Certifications ==
Region	Certification	Certified units/sales
United Kingdom (BPI)	Gold	100,000^{^}
^{^} Shipments figures based on certification alone.
