= Warrior Rock: Toyah on Tour =

Live album by Toyah
- Released: November 1982
- Recorded: 17–18 July 1982
- Venue: Hammersmith Odeon (London)
- Genre: New wave; gothic rock
- Length: 89:16 (original release); 79:32 (first CD re-release); 221:22 (2024 expanded edition)
- Label: Safari
- Producer: Nick Tauber

Toyah chronology
| The Changeling (1982) | Warrior Rock: Toyah on Tour (1982) | Love Is the Law (1983) |

Professional ratings
Review scores
| Source | Rating |
|---|---|
| Melody Maker | (favourable) |

Warrior Rock: Toyah on Tour is a live album by the English new wave band Toyah, fronted by Toyah Willcox, released in 1982 by Safari Records.

== Background ==
The material was recorded on 17 and 18 July 1982 at London's Hammersmith Odeon at the end of the band's The Changeling UK tour. "Neon Womb" and "Street Creature", although performed during those shows, do not feature on the final album. There is no video counterpart to the audio recording as none of the concerts has been camera taped. The album was produced by Nick Tauber and the mixing took place at the Marquee Studios in London in August and September 1982.

The original double LP release of this album was the only Toyah record to be issued in a gatefold sleeve. It additionally contained an insert with Toyah's biographical discography. The album was released in early November 1982 and subsequently debuted and peaked at number 20 on the UK Albums Chart. It also reached number 1 on the UK Independent Albums Chart.

Warrior Rock: Toyah on Tour was re-released in CD format in February 2005. In May 2024, the album was re-released by Cherry Red Records. It included the full, unabridged version of the original double album, adding previously unreleased live recordings from other dates of the 1982 tour and rehearsals material.

== Track listing ==
=== Original release ===
Side one

1. "Good Morning Universe" (Toyah Willcox, Joel Bogen) – 5:03
2. "Warrior Rock" (Willcox, Bogen, Phil Spalding) – 3:55
3. "Danced" (Willcox, Bogen, Peter Bush) – 7:18
4. "Jungles of Jupiter" (Willcox, Bogen, Spalding) – 6:23

Side two

5. "It's a Mystery" (Keith Hale) – 5:23
6. "Castaways" (Willcox, Bogen) – 5:20
7. "Angel & Me" (Willcox, Bogen) – 5:52
8. "Brave New World" (Willcox, Bogen) – 6:39

Side three

1. "The Packt" (Willcox, Bogen) – 7:05
2. "Thunder in the Mountains" (Willcox, Adrian Lee, Nigel Glockler) – 4:33
3. "We Are" (Willcox, Bogen) – 3:37
4. "I Want to Be Free" (Willcox, Bogen) – 6:38

Side four

5. "Dawn Chorus" (Willcox, Bogen, Spalding) – 5:13
6. "War Boys" (Willcox) – 6:04
7. "Ieya" (Willcox, Bogen, Bush) – 10:13

2005 CD edition contains abridged versions of "War Boys" and "Ieya" to accommodate CD length. On the digital version, "Danced" and "Ieya" were mistakenly taken from the 1980 live album Toyah! Toyah! Toyah!.

=== 2024 expanded deluxe edition ===
CD 1

1. "Good Morning Universe"
2. "Warrior Rock"
3. "Danced"
4. "Jungles of Jupiter"
5. "It's a Mystery"
6. "Castaways"
7. "Angel & Me"
8. "Brave New World"
9. "The Packt"
10. "Thunder in the Mountains"
11. "We Are"
12. "I Want to Be Free"

CD 2

1. "Dawn Chorus"
2. "War Boys"
3. "Ieya"

Warrior Rock Outtakes

4. "Street Creature" (Live Outtake)
5. "Hammersmith Jam" (Soundcheck)
6. "Good Morning Universe" (Soundcheck)

Tour Rehearsal

7. "Life in the Trees"
8. "Castaways"
9. "Warrior Rock"
10. "Jungles of Jupiter"
11. "Bird in Flight"

Toyah on Tour

12. "It's a Mystery" (Preston Guild Hall)
13. "Street Creature" (Newcastle City Hall)
14. "Dawn Chorus" (Liverpool Empire)
15. "War Boys" (Liverpool Empire)

CD 3

Toyah on Tour

1. "Good Morning Universe" (Newcastle City Hall)
2. "Neon Womb" (Bristol Hall)
3. "Warrior Rock" (Hammersmith Odeon)
4. "Danced" (Newcastle City Hall)
5. "Jungles of Jupiter" (Portsmouth Guildhall)
6. "Castaways" (Sheffield City Hall)
7. "Brave New World" (Newcastle City Hall)
8. "The Packt" (Birmingham Odeon)
9. "Thunder in the Mountains" (Liverpool Empire)
10. "Bird in Flight" (Hammersmith Odeon)
11. "Angel & Me" (Newcastle City Hall)
12. "We Are" (Newcastle City Hall)
13. "I Want to Be Free" (Newcastle City Hall)
14. "Ieya" (Brighton Arts Centre)

== Personnel ==
- Toyah Willcox – vocals
- Joel Bogen – guitar, guitar synth, backing vocals
- Keith Hale – keyboards, backing vocals
- Phil Spalding – bass, backing vocals
- Simon Phillips – drums

Production

- Nick Tauber – producer
- Simon Hanhart – engineer
- Barry Ainsworth, Andy Rose, Tim Wybrow – engineers
- Phil Harding, John Eden – additional mixing
- Mike Higgs, Andy Lovell, Mark Wade, Mike Duffy – mixing assistants

== Charts ==
| Chart (1982) | Peak position |
|---|---|
| UK Albums (Official Charts Company) | 20 |
| UK Independent Albums | 1 |

| Chart (2024) | Peak position |
|---|---|
| Scottish Albums | 22 |
| UK Physical Albums (Official Charts Company) | 18 |
| UK Vinyl Albums | 30 |
| UK Independent Albums | 12 |
