= Take the Leap! =

Studio album by Toyah
- Released: October 1993
- Recorded: 1993
- Genre: Rock; power pop
- Length: 59:30 (original release); 1:20:29 (2006 re-release)
- Label: Pony Canyon
- Producer: Toyah Willcox

Toyah chronology
Ophelia's Shadow (1991)	Take the Leap! (1993)	Dreamchild (1994)

2006 edition cover

Take the Leap! is the fifth solo studio album by the British singer Toyah Willcox, first released as Leap! in 1993 by Pony Canyon. It consists of new tracks as well as re-recordings of older songs from Toyah the band's repertoire.

== Background ==
The album was recorded in 1993 in a deserted farmhouse in the outskirts of Salisbury, in collaboration with the British band Friday Forever whom Toyah had met earlier that year. It showed a change in style from Toyah's previous recordings, and has a much more "raw" feel than the polished albums which preceded it. Many of the six new compositions had been written and demoed much earlier, including "Invisible Love" in 1989 with Simon Darlow. A glutch of demos recorded with Phil Nicholas in 1992 were also re-worked from their ambient style into album tracks with a rockier feel, namely "God Ceases to Dream" and "Now I'm Running". Another demo from these sessions, "Tears for Elie" was included as a bonus track on the 2006 reissue CD, along with "Requite Me", a stray 1992 demo produced by Willcox and Darlow.

"God Ceases to Dream" was written and recorded as an ambient electronic demo. It contains lyrics and melodies Willcox had originally written and performed with collaborative band side-projects, as the songs "Born Again" with Sunday All Over the World, and "Broken Special (The Island)" with Kiss of Reality. The latter was recorded and appeared on the Kiss of Reality's sophomore studio album, whilst "Born Again" was never recorded in studio. The chanting at the beginning of this album's version of "Ieya" are lyrics (which crib the Lord's Prayer) which also appeared on the Kiss of Reality album opening track "Harlequin (Holy Day)".

"Lust for Love" had previously been written and performed live as a Strange Girls song, and later recorded as a demo by Cris Bonacci and Willcox. The version found on this album is subtly altered.

"It's a Mystery" was due to appear on the album in a version recorded with Phil Nicholas and Friday Forever which was an African dance, tribal metal rock version. Complications at the time of original release meant this could not occur and a straightforward rock version was featured instead. The 2006 reissue of Take the Leap! includes this previously unreleased version. Tracks from 7 to 14 are completely re-recorded versions of songs taken mostly from Toyah's first three studio albums.

== Release and promotion ==
The album was originally released in Japan as Leap! only on cassette, and was sold at concerts during Toyah's 1993 tour, while a CD version called Take the Leap! was released the following year. Toyah went on to tour the album extensively throughout 1994. In 2006, the album was finally released by Edsel Records in the UK with bonus tracks, and consequently original copies of the album have become much sought after.

The album's first ever digital release came in December 2014 when it was made available to download at iTunes and Amazon and to stream via Spotify. To mark the album's twentieth anniversary, and first ever digital release, two EPs of Take the Leap!-era material, entitled Winter in Wonderland and Has God Ceased to Dream You, were released in December 2013 and December 2014, respectively. In addition, a free digital EP of bonus material, also pertaining to the Take the Leap! album period, entitled Whisper the Elixir, was issued by Willcox's official website shortly after the release of Has God Ceased to Dream You. Its tracks were "It's a Mystery" (Whispered Elixir Mix), "It's a Mystery" (Distant Sirens Mix), "It's a Mystery" (Acoustic Poolside) and "Waiting" (Alternate Mix).

In early 2020, the album was included in the Toyah Solo box set and reissued on double transparent vinyl. The LP edition omits bonus tracks from the 2006 CD re-release, and instead adds a selection of re-recordings from Looking Back.

== Track listing ==
=== Original release ===
1. "Now I'm Running" (Phil Nicholas, Toyah Willcox) – 5:21
2. "Lust for Love" (Cris Bonacci, Willcox) – 3:59
3. "Invisible Love" (Simon Darlow, Willcox) – 5:06
4. "Name of Love" (Nick Beggs, Willcox, Steven Askew) – 3:38
5. "Winter in Wonderland" (Beggs, Willcox, Askew) – 5:03
6. "God Ceases to Dream" (Nicholas, Willcox) – 5:23
7. "Ieya" (Willcox, Joel Bogen, Pete Bush) – 4:48
8. "Waiting" (Willcox, Steve Bray) – 2:56
9. "Neon Womb" (Willcox, Bush, Bogen) – 3:37
10. "Elusive Stranger" (Willcox, Bogen, Bush) – 4:02
11. "Our Movie" (Willcox, Bogen, Bush) – 3:00
12. "Thunder in the Mountains" (Willcox, Adrian Lee, Nigel Glockler) – 4:32
13. "I Wanna Be Free" (Willcox, Bogen) – 3:26
14. "It's a Mystery" (Keith Hale; additional lyrics: Willcox) – 4:39

2006 CD bonus tracks

15. "Requite Me" (Demo) (Willcox, Darlow) – 4:28
16. "Tears for Elie" (Demo) (Willcox, Nicholas) – 6:34
17. "Waiting" (Alternate Mix) (Willcox, Bray) – 3:00
18. "It's a Mystery" (Weybridge Mix) (Hale) – 6:15

=== 2020 LP edition ===
Side A

1. "Now I'm Running" (Phil Nicholas, Toyah Willcox)
2. "Lust for Love" (Cris Bonacci, Willcox)
3. "Invisible Love" (Simon Darlow, Willcox)
4. "Name of Love" (Nick Beggs, Willcox, Steven Askew)

Side B

1. "Winter in Wonderland" (Beggs, Willcox, Askew)
2. "God Ceases to Dream" (Nicholas, Willcox)
3. "Ieya" (Willcox, Joel Bogen, Pete Bush)
4. "Waiting" (Willcox, Steve Bray)
5. "Neon Womb" (Willcox, Bush, Bogen)

Side C

1. "Elusive Stranger" (Willcox, Bogen, Bush)
2. "Our Movie" (Willcox, Bogen, Bush)
3. "Thunder in the Mountains" (Willcox, Adrian Lee, Nigel Glockler)
4. "I Wanna Be Free" (Willcox, Bogen)
5. "It's a Mystery" (Keith Hale; additional lyrics: Willcox)

Side D

1. "Be Proud, Be Loud (Be Heard)" (Willcox, Bogen)
2. "Desire" (Willcox, Robert Fripp)
3. "Obsolete" (Willcox, Bogen, Glockler)
4. "Angel and Me" (Willcox, Bogen)
5. "Danced" (Willcox, Bogen, Bush)

== Personnel ==
- Toyah Willcox – vocals
- Paul Beavis – drums, percussion

Friday Forever

- Jolyon Dixon – rhythm and lead guitars, acoustic guitars
- Paul Luther – rhythm and lead guitars
- John Wakefield – bass
- Stuart Ross – additional drums

Production

- Toyah Willcox – producer
- Paul Nicholson, Chris Binns, Dave Kingsley – engineers, soundscapes
- Mark Evans – mixing at Big Ocean Studios, Weybridge, Surrey
- Paul Muggleton, Mike Paxman – mixing assistants
- Robert Fripp – sound advice

== Charts ==
Chart (2020)	Peak position
UK Independent Albums	46
UK Vinyl Albums	37
