= Mayhem (Toyah album) =

Compilation album by Toyah
- Released: February 1985
- Recorded: 1979–1982
- Genre: New wave; punk rock
- Length: 46:02
- Label: Safari
- Producer: Nick Tauber; Steve Lillywhite; Steve James; Keith Hale; Blood Donor; Chris Wyatt

Toyah chronology
Toyah! Toyah! Toyah! All the Hits (1984)	Mayhem (1985)	Minx (1985)

Mayhem is a compilation album by the English new wave band Toyah, fronted by Toyah Willcox, released in 1985 by Safari Records.

== Background ==
The album is a collection of previously unreleased material consisting mostly of demos and outtakes. When the band left Safari Records, the record company found enough material to compile one last album; this was apparently done without the consent of the band members. "We were never asked at the time by Safari if we'd be happy for certain demos to go on that album. (...) Of all the albums I wish had not been released, Mayhem is the one. It's sub-standard, with songs not intended for release. In fact, it makes my blood boil when I think of the plain exploitation of this album, but hopefully it never sold many copies. The songs on it were rehearsal demos, never intended for anything other than workshopping ideas", Toyah commented later.

The cassette version of Mayhem included three additional tracks. The album was reissued on CD by Cherry Red Records in 2005 and featured a further five previously unreleased bonus tracks. This new edition came with a recreated cover art, using better quality photos, and track-by-track sleeve notes. Most tracks from this expanded edition were later reissued across the deluxe edition formats of Toyah's studio albums between 2020 and 2024, within the context of other demo recordings and unreleased songs from their respective recording periods. The exceptions are "Change Of Scenery", "Island Race", "It's A Mystery" (demo) and "Rinaphobia".

== Track listing ==
Side one
No.	Title	Writer(s)	Recording date	Length
1.	"Clapham Junction"	Toyah Willcox, Joel Bogen	1981	2:53
2.	"Change of Scenery"	Keith Hale	1980	4:37
3.	"Problem Child" (†)	Willcox, Bogen, Peter Bush	1980	4:02
4.	"You're My Hero" (†)	Hale	1980	5:23
5.	"Cotton Vest" (early version of "Walkie-Talkie")	Willcox, Bogen	1981	2:39
6.	"Gaoler"	Willcox, Bogen, Bush	1979	2:41

Side two
No.	Title	Writer(s)	Recording date	Length
7.	"Paradise Child"	Willcox, Bogen	1982	2:38
8.	"Israel"	Willcox, Bogen, Bush	1979	4:42
9.	"Christmas Carol"	Willcox, Bogen, Bush	1979	4:59
10.	"The Merchant and the Nubile" (early version of "War Boys")	Willcox	1980	3:25
11.	"Danced" (previously unreleased version; †)	Willcox, Bogen, Bush	1979	5:25
12.	"I Believe in Father Christmas" (*)	Greg Lake, Pete Sinfield	1982	2:38

1985 cassette bonus tracks
No.	Title	Writer(s)	Recording date	Length
7.	"Guilty"	Willcox, Bogen, Bush	1979	2:51
8.	"Three Sided Face"	Willcox, Bogen, Bush	1979	3:02
15.	"Island Race"	Hale	1980	4:08
Total length:				55:03

2005 CD additional bonus tracks
No.	Title	Writer(s)	Recording date	Length
16.	"Love Me" (demo)	Willcox, Bogen, Bush	1979	3:14
17.	"Tribal Look" (demo)	Willcox, Bogen, Bush	1979	3:05
18.	"It's a Mystery" (demo)	Hale	1980	4:41
19.	"Run Wild, Run Free" (demo)	Willcox, Bogen	1982	3:31
20.	"Rinaphobia"	Hale	1980	5:44
Total length:				75:18

- Line-up unconfirmed on †
- Line-up unconfirmed except for Bogen and Hale on *

== Personnel ==
- Toyah Willcox – vocals
- Joel Bogen – guitar except † and ‡
- Phil Spalding – bass on 1, 5, 7, 10, 19
- Adrian Lee – keyboards on 1, 5, 7, 10, 19
- Simon Phillips – drums on 1, 7, 19
- Nigel Glockler – drums on 5, 10
- Keith Hale – keyboards on 4, 6, 12, 18 and 20
- Simon Etchell – keyboards on 18 and 20
- Gordon Coxon – drums on 6, 18 and 20
- Rikki Legair – bass on 6
- Mark Henry – bass on 8, 9, 13, 14, 16, 17
- Steve Bray – drums on 8, 9, 13, 14, 16, 17
- Pete Bush – keyboards on 8, 9, 13, 14, 16, 17
