= List of UK Independent Singles Chart number ones of the 1980s =

These are the UK Official Indie Chart number-one hits of the 1980s, as compiled by MRIB.

== 1980 ==
Date first reached number one	Song	Artist	Label	Duration
19 January	"Where's Captain Kirk?"	Spizzenergi	Rough Trade	7 weeks
8 March	"Food for Thought" / King	UB40	Graduate	12 weeks
31 May	"Bloody Revolutions"	Crass	Crass	5 weeks
5 July	"Love Will Tear Us Apart"	Joy Division	Factory	10* weeks
30 August	"Paranoid"	Black Sabbath	NEMS	5* weeks
13 September	Can't Cheat Karma (EP)	Zounds	Crass	2 weeks
18 October	"Requiem"	Killing Joke	E.G.	1 week
25 October	"Atmosphere"	Joy Division	Factory	2 weeks
8 November	"Kill the Poor"	Dead Kennedys	Cherry Red	1 week
15 November	"The Earth Dies Screaming" / "Dream a Lie"	UB40	Graduate	5* weeks
6 December	Beer Drinkers and Hell Raisers (EP)	Motörhead	Big Beat	1 week
27 December	"Cartrouble"	Adam and the Ants	Do It	7* weeks

== 1981 ==
Date first reached number one	Song	Artist	Label	Duration
24 January	"Zerox"	Adam and the Ants	Do It	3 weeks
7 March	"Nagasaki Nightmare"	Crass	Crass	2 weeks
21 March	"Ceremony"	New Order	Factory	3 weeks
11 April	Four from Toyah (EP)	Toyah	Safari	3 weeks
2 May	"Dreaming of Me"	Depeche Mode	Mute	1 week
9 May	Why (EP)	Discharge	Clay	2 weeks
23 May	"I Want To Be Free"	Toyah	Safari	1 week
30 May	"Don't Let It Pass You By / Don't Slow Down"	UB40	DEP International	1 week
6 June	"Too Drunk to Fuck"	Dead Kennedys	Cherry Red	5 weeks
11 July	"New Life"	Depeche Mode	Mute	7 weeks
29 August	"One in Ten"	UB40	DEP International	4 weeks
26 September	"Just Can't Get Enough"	Depeche Mode	Mute	2 weeks
10 October	"Procession"	New Order	Factory	3 weeks
31 October	"Thunder in the Mountains"	Toyah	Safari	4 weeks
28 November	"Six Guns"	Anti-Pasti	Rondelet	1 week
5 December	Four More From Toyah (EP)	Toyah	Safari	5* weeks
19 December	"Don't Let 'Em Grind You Down"	The Exploited & Anti-Pasti	Exploited	1 week

== 1982 ==
Date first reached number one	Song	Artist	Label	Duration
16 January	"Streets of London"	Anti-Nowhere League	WXYZ	2 weeks
30 January	"Do You Believe in the Westworld?"	Theatre of Hate	Burning Rome	2 weeks
13 February	"See You"	Depeche Mode	Mute	7 weeks
3 April	"I Hate People"	Anti-Nowhere League	WXYZ	2 weeks
17 April	"Papa's Got a Brand New Pigbag"	Pigbag	Y	4 weeks
15 May	"Only You"	Yazoo	Mute	5 weeks
19 June	"Temptation"	New Order	Factory	3 weeks
10 July	"Woman"	Anti-Nowhere League	WXYZ	2 weeks
24 July	"Don't Go"	Yazoo	Mute	8 weeks
18 September	"Leave in Silence"	Depeche Mode	Mute	6 weeks
30 October	"Shipbuilding"	Robert Wyatt	Rough Trade	3* weeks
6 November	"How Does It Feel to Be the Mother of 1000 Dead?"	Crass	Crass	3 weeks
27 November	"The Other Side of Love"	Yazoo	Mute	4 weeks
25 December	"Save Your Love"	Renée and Renato	Hollywood	3 weeks

== 1983 ==
Date first reached number one	Song	Artist	Label	Duration
15 January	"Fat Man"	Southern Death Cult	Situation Two	2 weeks
29 January	"Heartache Avenue"	The Maisonettes	Ready Steady Go!	3 weeks
19 February	"Oblivious"	Aztec Camera	Rough Trade	2 weeks
12 March	"Get the Balance Right!"	Depeche Mode	Mute Records	2 weeks
26 March	"Blue Monday"	New Order	Factory	13* weeks
11 June	"Nobody's Diary"	Yazoo	Mute	1 week
18 June	"Pills and Soap"	The Imposter (Elvis Costello)	F-Beat	2 weeks
2 July	"Sheep Farming in the Falklands"	Crass	Crass	2 weeks
16 July	"War Baby"	Tom Robinson	Panic	3 weeks
6 August	"Everything Counts"	Depeche Mode	Mute	5 weeks
10 September	"Confusion"	New Order	Factory	4 weeks
5 November	"Temple of Love"	The Sisters of Mercy	Merciful Release	1 week
26 November	"This Charming Man"	The Smiths	Rough Trade	7* weeks
3 December	"Never Never"	The Assembly	Mute	2 weeks

== 1984 ==
Date first reached number one	Song	Artist	Label	Duration
28 January	"What Difference Does It Make?"	The Smiths	Rough Trade	9 weeks
31 March	"You're Already Dead"	Crass	Crass	1 week
7 April	"People Are People"	Depeche Mode	Mute	3 weeks
28 April	"Hand in Glove"	Sandie Shaw	Rough Trade	1 week
5 May	"Thieves Like Us"	New Order	Factory	2 weeks
19 May	"Pearly-Dewdrops' Drops"	Cocteau Twins	4AD	2 weeks
2 June	"Spiritwalker"	The Cult	Situation Two	1 week
9 June	"Heaven Knows I'm Miserable Now"	The Smiths	Rough Trade	3* weeks
23 June	"Thanks for the Night"	The Damned	Damned	2 weeks
14 July	"In the Ghetto"	Nick Cave & The Bad Seeds	Mute	4 weeks
11 August	"Walk into the Sun"	The March Violets	Rebirth	2 weeks
25 August	"Agadoo"	Black Lace	Flair	2 weeks
8 September	"William, It Was Really Nothing"	The Smiths	Rough Trade	2 weeks
22 September	"Master and Servant"	Depeche Mode	Mute	6 weeks
3 November	"Marimba Jive"	Red Guitars	Self Drive	2 weeks
17 November	"The Price"	New Model Army	Abstract	1 week
24 November	"Blasphemous Rumours" / "Somebody"	Depeche Mode	Mute	3 weeks
15 December	"Nellie the Elephant"	Toy Dolls	Volume	7 weeks

== 1985 ==
Date first reached number one	Song	Artist	Label	Duration
2 February	"Upside Down"	The Jesus and Mary Chain	Creation	4* weeks
16 February	"How Soon Is Now?"	The Smiths	Rough Trade	4 weeks
30 March	"Aikea-Guinea"	Cocteau Twins	4AD	2* weeks
6 April	"Shakespeare's Sister"	The Smiths	Rough Trade	3 weeks
4 May	"Be with Me"	Red Guitars	One Way	2 weeks
18 May	"Shake the Disease"	Depeche Mode	Mute	2 weeks
1 June	"The Perfect Kiss"	New Order	Factory	3 weeks
22 June	"You'll Never Walk Alone"	The Crowd	Spartan	3 weeks
13 July	"Iron Masters"	The Men They Couldn't Hang	Demon	3* weeks
20 July	"That Joke Isn't Funny Anymore"	The Smiths	Rough Trade	2 weeks
17 August	"Tupelo"	Nick Cave & The Bad Seeds	Mute	2 weeks
31 August	"Well Well Well"	The Woodentops	Rough Trade	3 weeks
21 September	"Primitive Painters"	Felt	4AD	2 weeks
5 October	"It's Called a Heart"	Depeche Mode	Mute	1 week
12 October	"The Boy with the Thorn in His Side"	The Smiths	Rough Trade	3 weeks
2 November	"The Battle Continues"	Conflict	Mortarhate	2 weeks
16 November	"Can Your Pussy Do the Dog?"	The Cramps	Big Beat	1 week
23 November	"Sub-culture"	New Order	Factory	1 week
30 November	"Tiny Dynamine"	Cocteau Twins	4AD	2 weeks
14 December	"Echoes in a Shallow Bay"	Cocteau Twins	4AD	8 weeks

== 1986 ==
Date first reached number one	Song	Artist	Label	Duration
8 February	"Giving Ground"	The Sisterhood	Merciful Release	4* weeks
1 March	"Stripped"	Depeche Mode	Mute	1 week
15 March	The Trumpton Riots EP	Half Man Half Biscuit	Probe Plus	3 weeks
5 April	"Shellshock"	New Order	Factory	3 weeks
26 April	"Godstar"	Psychic TV & The Angels of Light	Temple	2 weeks
10 May	"Rules and Regulations"	We've Got a Fuzzbox and We're Gonna Use It	Vindaloo	4 weeks
7 June	"Bigmouth Strikes Again"	The Smiths	Rough Trade	5 weeks
12 July	"The Singer"	Nick Cave & The Bad Seeds	Mute	2 weeks
26 July	"Garden of Delight"	The Mission	Chapter 22	2 weeks
9 August	"Panic"	The Smiths	Rough Trade	4 weeks
6 September	"Tokyo Storm Warning"	Elvis Costello & The Attractions	Demon	2 weeks
20 September	"Come Here My Love"	This Mortal Coil	4AD	1 week
27 September	"State of the Nation"	New Order	Factory	3 weeks
18 October	"Dickie Davies Eyes"	Half Man Half Biscuit	Probe Plus	1 week
25 October	"(Love Affair With) Everyday Living"	The Woodentops	Rough Trade	1 week
1 November	"Love's Easy Tears"	Cocteau Twins	4AD	1 week
8 November	"Ask"	The Smiths	Rough Trade	2 weeks
22 November	"Bizarre Love Triangle"	New Order	Factory	2 weeks
5 December	"Sometimes"	Erasure	Mute	4 weeks

== 1987 ==
Date first reached number one	Song	Artist	Label	Duration
3 January	"Into the Groove(y)"	Ciccone Youth	Blast First	1 week
10 January	"Kiss"	Age of Chance	FON	3 weeks
31 January	"Shoplifters of the World Unite"	The Smiths	Rough Trade	4 weeks
28 February	"It Doesn't Have to Be"	Erasure	Mute	8 weeks
25 April	"Sheila Take a Bow"	The Smiths	Rough Trade	3 weeks
16 May	"Nosedive Karma"	Gaye Bykers on Acid	In Tape	3 weeks
6 June	"Victim of Love"	Erasure	Mute	2 weeks
20 June	"Can't Take No More"	The Soup Dragons	Raw TV	4 weeks
18 July	"Flowers in Our Hair"	All About Eve	Eden	2 weeks
1 August	"True Faith"	New Order	Factory	3 weeks
22 August	"Girlfriend in a Coma"	The Smiths	Rough Trade	2 weeks
5 September	"Pump Up the Volume"	M/A/R/R/S	4AD	7 weeks
24 October	"Blue Water"	Fields of the Nephilim	Situation Two	2 weeks
7 November	"My Baby Just Cares for Me"	Nina Simone	Charly	5 weeks
12 December	"Touched by the Hand of God"	New Order	Factory	6 weeks

== 1988 ==
Date first reached number one	Song	Artist	Label	Duration
23 January	"Behind the Wheel"	Depeche Mode	Mute	1 week
30 January	"Rok da House"	Beatmasters & Cookie Crew	Rhythm King	1 week
6 February	"Coldsweat"	The Sugarcubes	One Little Indian	2 weeks
20 February	"I Should Be So Lucky"	Kylie Minogue	PWL	1 week
27 February	"Beat Dis"	Bomb the Bass	Mister-Ron	4 weeks
26 March	"Ship of Fools"	Erasure	Mute	4 weeks
23 April	"Theme from S'Express"	S'Express	Rhythm King	4 weeks
21 May	"Blue Monday 1988"	New Order	Factory	2 weeks
4 June	"Got to Be Certain"	Kylie Minogue	PWL	1 week
11 June	"Moonchild"	Fields of the Nephilim	Situation Two	2 weeks
25 June	"Doctorin' the Tardis"	The Timelords	KLF Communications	4 weeks
23 July	"Superfly Guy"	S'Express	Rhythm King	3 weeks
13 August	"The Only Way Is Up"	Yazz & The Plastic Population	Big Life	5 weeks
17 September	"Birthday"	The Sugarcubes	One Little Indian	1 week
24 September	"Stop This Crazy Thing"	Coldcut feat. Junior Reid	Big Life	1 week
1 October	"Why Are You Being So Reasonable Now?"	The Wedding Present	Reception	3 weeks
22 October	"A Little Respect"	Erasure	Mute	2 weeks
5 November	"Je Ne Sais Pas Pourquoi"	Kylie Minogue	PWL	1 week
12 November	"Stand Up for Your Love Rights"	Yazz	Big Life	3 weeks
3 December	"Say a Little Prayer"	Bomb the Bass feat. Maureen	Rhythm King	1 week
10 December	"Fine Time"	New Order	Factory	2 weeks
24 December	Crackers International (EP)	Erasure	Mute	8 weeks

== 1989 ==
Date first reached number one	Song	Artist	Label	Duration
18 February	"Can't Be Sure"	The Sundays	Rough Trade	3 weeks
11 March	"Hey Music Lover"	S'Express	Rhythm King	1 week
18 March	"Too Many Broken Hearts"	Jason Donovan	PWL	3 weeks
8 April	"Monkey Gone to Heaven"	Pixies	4AD	4 weeks
6 May	"Who's in the House?"	Beatmasters feat. MC Merlin	Rhythm King	1 week
13 May	"Hand on Your Heart"	Kylie Minogue	PWL	1 week
20 May	"Just Like Heaven"	Dinosaur Jr.	Blast First	1 week
27 May	"Ferry Cross the Mersey"	The Christians, Holly Johnson, Paul McCartney, Gerry Marsden & Stock Aitken Waterman	PWL	3 weeks
17 June	"Sealed with a Kiss"	Jason Donovan	PWL	2 weeks
1 July	"Here Comes Your Man"	Pixies	4AD	3 weeks
22 July	"Hypnotized"	Spacemen 3	Fire	1 week
29 July	"She Bangs the Drums"	The Stone Roses	Silvertone	3 weeks
19 August	"Pure"	The Lightning Seeds	Ghetto	2 weeks
2 September	"Hey DJ / I Can't Dance (To That Music You're Playing)"	Beatmasters feat. Betty Boo	Rhythm King	1 week
9 September	"Find Out Why"	Inspiral Carpets	Cow	1 week
16 September	"Run 2"	New Order	Factory	1 week
23 September	"Regina"	The Sugarcubes	One Little Indian	1 week
30 September	"Personal Jesus"	Depeche Mode	Mute	1 week
7 October	"Drama!"	Erasure	Mute	2 weeks
21 October	"Street Tuff"	Rebel MC & Double Trouble	Desire	2 weeks
4 November	"Eye Know"	De La Soul	Tommy Boy	1 week
11 November	"Widowermaker"	Butthole Surfers	Blast First	2 weeks
25 November	"Move"	Inspiral Carpets	Cow	1 week
2 December	"Fools Gold / What the World Is Waiting For"	The Stone Roses	Silvertone	3 weeks
23 December	"Getting Away with It"	Electronic	Factory	3 weeks

== See also ==
- List of UK Independent Albums Chart number ones of the 1980s
- 1980s in music
- List of UK Singles Chart number ones of the 1980s
