= List of UK Independent Albums Chart number ones of the 1980s =

These are the UK Official Indie Chart number-one albums of the 1980s, as compiled by MRIB.

Artist	Album	Record label	Date first reached number one	Total number of weeks
1980
Adam and the Ants	Dirk Wears White Sox	Do It	19 January 1980	13*
Crass	Stations of the Crass	Crass	26 January 1980	5*
Joy Division	Unknown Pleasures	Factory	9 February 1980	1
Toyah	Sheep Farming in Barnet	Safari	23 February 1980	3
The Cramps	Songs the Lord Taught Us	Illegal	29 March 1980	1
The Pop Group	For How Much Longer Do We Tolerate Mass Murder?	Y	5 April 1980	3
The Slits	Bootleg Retrospective	Y	26 April 1980	3
The Fall	Totale's Turns	Rough Trade	17 May 1980	5
Toyah	The Blue Meaning	Safari	21 June 1980	2
Black Sabbath	Live at Last	NEMS	5 July 1980	3
Joy Division	Closer	Factory	26 July 1980	8
UB40	Signing Off	Graduate	20 September 1980	11*
Bauhaus	In the Flat Field	4AD	22 November 1980	2
The Fall	Grotesque (After the Gramme)	Rough Trade	6 December 1980	3
1981
Theatre of Hate	He Who Dares Wins	Burning Rome Records	4 April 1981	5
A Certain Ratio	To Each...	Factory	9 May 1981	1
The Exploited	Punks Not Dead	Secret	16 May 1981	2
Au Pairs	Playing with a Different Sex	Human	30 May 1981	2
UB40	Present Arms	DEP International	13 June 1981	11*
Crass	Penis Envy	Crass	11 July 1981	5
Anti-Pasti	The Last Call	Rondelet	22 August 1981	2
Cabaret Voltaire	Red Mecca	Rough Trade	26 September 1981	1
Joy Division	Still	Factory	24 October 1981	1
Depeche Mode	Speak & Spell	Mute	21 November 1981	7*
New Order	Movement	Factory	5 December 1981	4*
1982
A Certain Ratio	Sextet	Factory	30 January 1982	4*
23 Skidoo	Seven Songs	Fetish	6 March 1982	1
Pigbag	Dr Heckle and Mr Jive	Y	13 March 1982	10*
The 4-Skins	The Good, The Bad & The 4-Skins	Secret	15 May 1982	1
Anti-Nowhere League	We Are...The League	WXYZ	29 May 1982	5*
The Exploited	Troops of Tomorrow	Secret	26 June 1982	3
Cabaret Voltaire	2x45	Rough Trade	24 July 1982	1
The Birthday Party	Junkyard	4AD	31 July 1982	4
Crass	Christ - The Album	Crass	28 August 1982	1
Yazoo	Upstairs at Eric's	Mute	4 September 1982	12*
UB40	UB44	DEP International	16 October 1982	3*
Depeche Mode	A Broken Frame	Mute	30 October 1982	2
Toyah	Warrior Rock: Toyah on Tour	Safari	20 November 1982	2
1983
Various artists	Pillows & Prayers	Cherry Red	15 January 1983	5
Flux of Pink Indians	Strive to Survive Causing Least Suffering Possible	Spiderleg	19 February 1983	2
The Meteors	Wreckin' Crew	ID Records	5 March 1983	3
Sex Gang Children	Song and Legend	Illuminated	26 March 1983	2
Conflict	It's Time to See Who's Who	Corpus Christi	9 April 1983	3
Aztec Camera	High Land, Hard Rain	Rough Trade	30 April 1983	2
New Order	Power, Corruption & Lies	Factory	14 May 1983	7*
Crass	Yes Sir, I Will	Crass	18 June 1983	3
The Cramps	...Off the Bone	Illegal	9 July 1983	2
Yazoo	You and Me Both	Mute	23 July 1983	8*
Depeche Mode	Construction Time Again	Mute	3 September 1983	5*
Cocteau Twins	Head Over Heels	4AD	5 November 1983	4
The Cramps	Smell of Female	Big Beat	3 December 1983	3
The Fall	Perverted by Language	Rough Trade	24 December 1983	4
1984
Billy Bragg	Life's a Riot with Spy vs Spy	Go! Discs	21 January 1984	6
The Smiths	The Smiths	Rough Trade	3 March 1984	12
New Model Army	Vengeance	Abstract	26 May 1984	1
Nick Cave and the Bad Seeds	From Her to Eternity	Mute	2 June 1984	6
Xmal Deutschland	Tocsin	4AD	14 July 1984	3
Various artists	Rockabilly Psychosis and the Garage Disease	Big Beat	4 August 1984	1
23 Skidoo	Urban Gamelan	Illuminated	11 August 1984	1
Theatre of Hate	Revolution	Burning Rome Records	18 August 1984	6
Skeletal Family	Burning Oil	Red Rhino	29 September 1984	2
Depeche Mode	Some Great Reward	Mute	13 October 1984	2
This Mortal Coil	It'll End in Tears	4AD	27 October 1984	4
The Smiths	Hatful of Hollow	Rough Trade	24 November 1984	13
1985
The Smiths	Meat is Murder	Rough Trade	23 February 1985	12
The Long Ryders	Native Sons	Frontier	18 May 1985	2
New Order	Low-Life	Factory	1 June 1985	8
The Men They Couldn't Hang	Night of a Thousand Candles	Demon	27 July 1985	4
Colourbox	Colourbox	4AD	24 August 1985	4
Guana Batz	Held Down to Vinyl .... At Last!	ID Records	21 September 1985	2
The June Brides	There Are Eight Million Stories...	Pink	5 October 1985	4
Hüsker Dü	Flip Your Wig	SST	2 November 1985	1
Depeche Mode	The Singles 81→85	Mute	9 November 1985	3*
Microdisney	The Clock Comes Down The Stairs	Rough Trade	23 November 1985	1
Scraping Foetus Off The Wheel	Nail	Self Immolation/Some Bizzare	7 December 1985	2
Dead Kennedys	Frankenchrist	Alternative Tentacles	21 December 1985	5
1986
Half Man Half Biscuit	Back in the DHSS	Probe Plus	25 January 1986	6*
The Cramps	A Date with Elvis	Big Beat	1 March 1986	4*
Red Lorry Yellow Lorry	Paint Your Wagon	Red Rhino	22 March 1986	1
Depeche Mode	Black Celebration	Mute	5 April 1986	2
Cocteau Twins	Victorialand	4AD	26 April 1986	4
That Petrol Emotion	Manic Pop Thrill	Demon	24 May 1985	5
The Smiths	The Queen Is Dead	Rough Trade	21 June 1986	8*
Zodiac Mindwarp and the Love Reaction	High Priest of Love	Food	16 August 1986	1
Nick Cave and the Bad Seeds	Kicking Against the Pricks	Mute	30 August 1986	4
Elvis Costello and the Attractions	Blood & Chocolate	Demon	27 September 1986	2
New Order	Brotherhood	Factory	11 October 1986	6
Nick Cave and the Bad Seeds	Your Funeral... My Trial	Mute	22 November 1986	2
Harold Budd, Elizabeth Fraser, Robin Guthrie and Simon Raymonde	The Moon and the Melodies	4AD	6 December 1986	2
Dead Kennedys	Bedtime for Democracy	Alternative Tentacles	20 December 1986	7
1987
Wiseblood	Dirtdish	K 422	7 February 1987	3
The Smiths	The World Won't Listen	Rough Trade	28 February 1987	5
The Railway Children	Reunion Wilderness	Factory	4 April 1987	1
Erasure	The Circus	Mute	11 April 1987	16*
The Woodentops	Live Hypnobeat Live	Rough Trade	9 May 1987	1
Wire	The Ideal Copy	Mute	16 May 1987	2
Fields of the Nephilim	Dawnrazor	Situation Two	30 May 1987	2
Sonic Youth	Sister	Blast First	13 June 1987	3
Dead Kennedys	Give Me Convenience or Give Me Death	Alternative Tentacles	4 July 1987	5
Conflict	Turning Rebellion into Money	Mortarhate	8 August 1987	2
New Order	Substance 1987	Factory	22 August 1987	5
Big Black	Songs About Fucking	Touch and Go	26 September 1987	1
The Smiths	Strangeways, Here We Come	Rough Trade	3 October 1987	5*
The Wedding Present	George Best	Reception	24 October 1987	5*
The Fall	Palace of Swords Reversed	Rough Trade	5 December 1987	2
The Stupids	Jesus Meets The Stupids	Vinyl Solution	19 December 1987	2
1988
The Woodentops	Wooden Foot Cops on the Highway	Rough Trade	5 March 1988	4
Erasure	The Innocents	Mute	30 April 1988	5*
The Sugarcubes	Life's Too Good	One Little Indian	21 May 1988	2
The House of Love	The House of Love	Creation	4 June 1988	4
The Weather Prophets	Judges, Juries and Horsemen	Creation	25 June 1988	1
A. R. Kane	69	Rough Trade	9 July 1988	1
Joy Division	Substance	Factory	23 July 1988	3
The Wedding Present	Tommy	Reception	13 August 1988	1
Various artists	Doing It for the Kids	Creation	20 August 1988	4
The Smiths	Rank	Rough Trade	17 September 1988	2
Cocteau Twins	Blue Bell Knoll	4AD	1 October 1988	3
Dinosaur Jr.	Bug	Blast First	22 October 1988	1
Sonic Youth	Daydream Nation	Enigma	29 October 1988	3
Napalm Death	From Enslavement to Obliteration	Earache	19 November 1988	2
My Bloody Valentine	Isn't Anything	Creation	3 December 1988	3
Kylie Minogue	Kylie	PWL	24 December 1988	4
1989
Loop	Fade Out	Head	4 February 1989	1
New Order	Technique	Factory	11 February 1989	5
Spacemen 3	Playing with Fire	Fire	18 March 1989	2
De La Soul	3 Feet High and Rising	Tommy Boy	1 April 1989	2
Pixies	Doolittle	4AD	29 April 1989	3
Jason Donovan	Ten Good Reasons	PWL	20 May 1989	4*
The Stone Roses	The Stone Roses	Silvertone	3 June 1989	19*
Mega City Four	Tranzophobia	Decoy	24 June 1989	1
Fugazi	Margin Walker	Dischord	29 July 1989	2
The Primitives	Lazy 86–88	Lazy	9 September 1989	1
Primal Scream	Primal Scream	Creation	30 September 1989	2
The Sugarcubes	Here Today, Tomorrow Next Week!	One Little Indian	14 October 1989	2
Erasure	Wild!	Mute	28 October 1989	3
Mudhoney	Mudhoney	Sub Pop	18 November 1989	2

== See also ==
- List of UK Independent Singles Chart number ones of the 1980s
- 1980s in music
- List of UK Albums Chart number ones of the 1980s
