= Toyah! Toyah! Toyah! =

Live album by Toyah
- Released: 1980
- Recorded: 17 June 1980
- Venue: Lafayette Club, Wolverhampton
- Genre: New wave; punk rock
- Length: 40:41 (original release); 73:10 (2006 CD re-release)
- Label: Safari
- Producer: Nick Tauber

Toyah chronology
The Blue Meaning (1980)	Toyah! Toyah! Toyah! (1980)	Anthem (1981)

Singles from Toyah! Toyah! Toyah!
- 1. "Danced" Released: 1980

Professional ratings
Review scores
Source	Rating
AllMusic	3/5 stars
Record Collector	2/5 stars

Toyah! Toyah! Toyah! is a live album by the English new wave band Toyah, fronted by Toyah Willcox, released in 1980 by Safari Records.

== Background ==
The album was recorded on 17 June 1980 at the Lafayette Club in Wolverhampton, using the Rolling Stones Mobile Studio. The concert was also filmed by ATV as part of a TV documentary about the band and its eponymous singer. It aired on 18 December 1980. A live version of "Danced" was released as a single at the end of 1980 to promote the album. Toyah! Toyah! Toyah! reached number 22 on the UK Albums Chart and number 3 on the UK Independent Albums Chart, and was subsequently certified silver in the UK in 1981 for selling more than 60,000 copies.

The album saw its first CD release in 1990 on the Great Expectations label. A new remastered version was released on 30 October 2006 via Cherry Red Records. This expanded edition features extra live tracks from 1980 and from the 1982 The Changeling tour. The latter tracks include those cut from the abridged CD release of Warrior Rock: Toyah on Tour – albeit taken from a different concert of the same tour. Six of the eight bonus tracks are previously unreleased. The new edition includes an introductory note from Toyah Willcox and a sleevenote by her archivist Craig Astley, in addition to rare live photographs. In May 2022, the album was re-released by Cherry Red Records, adding four live tracks previously cut from the album, and a DVD with the 1980 ATV documentary.

== Track listing ==
=== Original release ===
Side one
No.	Title	Writer(s)	Length
1.	"Victims of the Riddle"	Toyah Willcox, Keith Hale, Steve James, Joel Bogen, Peter Bush	3:30
2.	"Indecision"	Willcox, Bogen, Bush, Mark Henry	2:35
3.	"Love Me"	Willcox, Bogen, Bush	3:00
4.	"Visions"	Willcox, Bogen, Bush	4.15
5.	"Tribal Look"	Willcox, Bogen, Bush, Charlie Francis, Steve Bray	3:30
6.	"Bird in Flight"	Willcox, Bogen, Bush, Francis, Bray	4:00

Side two
No.	Title	Writer(s)	Length
7.	"Danced"	Willcox, Bogen, Bush	5:30
8.	"Insects"	Willcox, Bogen, Bush	2:45
9.	"Race Through Space"	Willcox, Bogen, Bush	3:06
10.	"Ieya"	Willcox, Bogen, Bush	8:30

2006 CD edition bonus tracks
No.	Title	Writer(s)	Length
11.	"Ghosts" (Live in Wolverhamptron, 1980; B-side of the single "Danced")	Willcox, Bogen, Bush, Francis	2:41
12.	"Neon Womb" (Live in Wolverhamptron, 1980; B-side of the single "Danced")	Willcox, Bogen, Bush	3:47
13.	"Love Me" (Live at ICA, London, 1980)	Willcox, Bogen, Bush	2:53
14.	"Waiting" (Live at ICA, London, 1980)	Willcox, Bray	2:23
15.	"Street Creature" (Live at Glasgow Apollo, 1982)	Willcox, Bogen	4:01
16.	"Neon Womb" (Live at Glasgow Apollo, 1982)	Willcox, Bogen, Bush	4:54
17.	"Dawn Chorus" (Live at Glasgow Apollo, 1982)	Willcox, Bogen, Phil Spalding	4:37
18.	"War Boys" (Live at Glasgow Apollo, 1982)	Willcox	5:43

=== 2022 expanded deluxe edition ===
No.	Title	Writer(s)	Length
1.	"Victims of the Riddle"	Toyah Willcox, Keith Hale, Steve James, Joel Bogen, Peter Bush	3:33
2.	"Indecision"	Willcox, Bogen, Bush, Mark Henry	2:46
3.	"Love Me"	Willcox, Bogen, Bush	3:15
4.	"Vision"	Willcox, Bogen, Bush	4.25
5.	"Tribal Look"	Willcox, Bogen, Bush, Charlie Francis, Steve Bray	3:43
6.	"Bird in Flight"	Willcox, Bogen, Bush, Francis, Bray	3:59
7.	"Danced"	Willcox, Bogen, Bush	5:47
8.	"Insects"	Willcox, Bogen, Bush	2:47
9.	"Race Through Space"	Willcox, Bogen, Bush	3:16
10.	"Ieya"	Willcox, Bogen, Bush	8:58
11.	"Ghosts"	Willcox, Bogen, Bush, Francis	2:45
12.	"Neon Womb" (Unedited Version)	Willcox, Bogen, Bush	5:37
13.	"She"	Willcox, Bogen, Bush, Francis, Bray	5:27
14.	"Danced" (Encore Version)	Willcox, Bogen, Bush	4:32

== Personnel ==
Band members

- Toyah Willcox – vocals & noises
- Joel Bogen – guitar
- Peter Bush – keyboards
- Charlie Francis – bass
- Steve Bray – drums
- Phil Spalding – bass (1982 material only)
- Keith Hale – keyboards (1982 material only)
- Simon Phillips – drums (1982 material only)

Production

- Nick Tauber – producer, mixing
- Phil Harding – engineer

== Charts ==
Chart (1981)	Peak position
UK Albums (Official Charts Company)	22
UK Independent Albums	3

Chart (2022)	Peak position
Scottish Albums	8
UK Albums (Official Charts Company)	72
UK Vinyl Albums	10
UK Independent Albums	2

== Certifications ==
Region	Certification	Certified units/sales
United Kingdom (BPI)	Silver	60,000^{^}
^{^} Shipments figures based on certification alone.
