= Four from Toyah =

EP by Toyah
- Released: February 1981
- Genre: New wave
- Length: 18:15
- Label: Safari
- Producer: Nick Tauber

Toyah chronology
The Blue Meaning (1980)	Four from Toyah (1981)	Anthem (1981)

Four from Toyah is the second EP by the English new wave band Toyah, fronted by Toyah Willcox, released in 1981 by Safari Records. It reached the top 5 on the UK Singles Chart on the back of its lead track, "It's a Mystery".

== Background ==
It was the band's first release to feature the new lineup of Willcox, Joel Bogen, Phil Spalding, Nigel Glockler and Adrian Lee. Although it was released in the 7" vinyl single format, it was essentially an EP with four songs. Toyah clarified that the band didn't feel under pressure to write and include those extra songs on Four from Toyah nor its follow-up Four More from Toyah: "We did produce extra songs for quality of money. I never felt under pressure. (...) It was a joy to write these extra songs and also, because these EPs were standalone, it meant that I could explore lyrical avenues that perhaps I wouldn't be able to put onto an album".

Apart from "It's a Mystery", the EP featured "War Boys" which Toyah wanted to be the lead track instead, "Revelations" with lyrics telling about predictions, and "Angels & Demons" which Toyah said is about "growing up and everything you're told not to believe in". "It's a Mystery" would later appear on the album Anthem, although the other three tracks would not appear on an album until the original CD release of Anthem in 1985. They were also included in the album's 1999 CD re-issue as well as the 2005 compilation The Safari Singles Collection Part 2: 1981–1983.

The EP was the breakthrough for the band, reaching number 4 in the UK Singles Charts on the back of its lead track, "It's a Mystery", and becoming Toyah's first number 1 in the UK Independent Singles Chart. It is listed at number 49 on the official top 50 best-selling singles of 1981 and was eventually certified silver in the UK. In June 2021, Four from Toyah was re-released by Cherry Red Records in 12" vinyl format for Record Store Day, with additional tracks and new artwork.

== Track listing ==
=== Original 7" release ===
Side A

1. "It's a Mystery" (Keith Hale) – 4:13
2. "Revelations" (Joel Bogen, Toyah Willcox) – 3:34

Side B

3. "War Boys" (Willcox) – 3:38
4. "Angels & Demons" (Willcox, Hale) – 6:50

=== 2021 12" re-release ===
Side A

1. "It's a Mystery"
2. "Revelations"
3. "War Boys"
4. "Angels & Demons"

Side B

5. "It's a Mystery" (Original Version; Blood Donor feat. Toyah Willcox)
6. "Jack & Jill"
7. "The Merchant & the Nubile"
8. "Angels & Demons" (Demo)

== Personnel ==
- Toyah Willcox – vocals
- Joel Bogen – guitar
- Phil Spalding – bass
- Nigel Glockler – drums
- Adrian Lee – keyboards

== Charts ==
Chart (1981)	Peak position
UK Singles (Official Charts Company)	4
UK Independent Singles	1

Chart (2021)	Peak position
UK Independent Albums (Official Charts Company)	50

== Certifications ==
Region	Certification	Certified units/sales
United Kingdom (BPI)	Silver	250,000^{^}
^{^} Shipments figures based on certification alone.
