= Four More from Toyah =

EP by Toyah
- Released: November 1981
- Recorded: 1981
- Genre: New wave
- Label: Safari
- Producer: Nick Tauber

Toyah chronology
Four from Toyah (1981)	Four More from Toyah (1981)	The Changeling (1982)

Four More from Toyah is the third EP by the English new wave band Toyah, fronted by Toyah Willcox, released in 1981 by Safari Records. It reached the top 20 in the UK and Ireland.

== Background ==
The lead song on the release, "Good Morning Universe", was written in late 1981, after Toyah Willcox received the backing track from Joel Bogen, which she described as "joyous" and immediately came up with the song's title. It would become the opening song on Toyah's subsequent live concerts. "In the Fairground" was written in the autumn of 1981 and its dystopian lyrics were inspired by "decay setting in" and the "sense of economic loss".

Four More from Toyah followed the concept of Four from Toyah released earlier that year, which instead of being a regular 2-track single, was extended into a 7-inch EP. Toyah clarified that the band didn't feel under pressure to write and include extra songs on neither Four More from Toyah nor its predecessor: "We did produce extra songs for quality of money. I never felt under pressure. (...) It was a joy to write these extra songs and also, because these EPs were standalone, it meant that I could explore lyrical avenues that perhaps I wouldn't be able to put onto an album". The first 100,000 pressings of the single came with a free flexi disc which contained a fifth exclusive track, "Stand Proud". This collectability helped the single reach number 14 in the UK Singles Chart. It was also Toyah's fourth consecutive, and final, number 1 in the UK Independent Singles Chart. All sides of the release, including the flexi disc, ran at 33 rpm. 12-inch vinyl editions of this EP were released in some territories, featuring the same four tracks, with a playing speed of 45 rpm. Promotional copies of a 7-inch single with "Good Morning Universe" and "In the Fairground" on side A and side B, respectively, were also released in the UK.

None of the tracks on the EP were included on an album at the time, but "Good Morning Universe", "The Furious Futures" and "Stand Proud" were included on the 1998 compilation The Best of Toyah: Proud, Loud & Heard, while another 1998 compilation, Live & More, featured "Urban Tribesmen". "Good Morning Universe" and "In the Fairground" then made it onto the 1999 CD reissue of The Changeling. In 2005, all tracks from the original EP, bar "Stand Proud", featured on the compilation The Safari Singles Collection Part 2: 1981–1983. In December 2022, Four More from Toyah was re-released by Cherry Red Records and expanded into an 8-track 12-inch minialbum.

== Track listing ==
=== Original 7-inch release ===
Side A

1. "Good Morning Universe" (Toyah Willcox, Joel Bogen) – 3:36
2. "Urban Tribesmen" (Willcox, Bogen, Phil Spalding, Adrian Lee, Simon Phillips) – 3:22

Side B

1. "In the Fairground" (Willcox, Bogen) – 3:15
2. "The Furious Futures" (Willcox, Bogen, Spalding) – 3:24

Bonus flexidisc

1. "Stand Proud" (Willcox)

=== 2022 12-inch re-release ===
Side A

1. "Good Morning Universe"
2. "Urban Tribesmen"
3. "In the Fairground"
4. "The Furious Futures"

Side B

5. "Go Berserk (Tour Intro)"
6. "Stand Proud"
7. "Clapham Junction"
8. "I Want to Be Free" (Roundhouse Session)

== Personnel ==
- Toyah Willcox – vocals
- Joel Bogen – guitar
- Phil Spalding – bass
- Adrian Lee – keyboards
- Simon Phillips – drums

== Charts ==
Chart (1981)	Peak position
Irish Singles (IRMA)	13
UK Singles (Official Charts Company)	14
UK Independent Singles	1

Chart (2022)	Peak position
UK Albums Sales (Official Charts Company)	100
UK Independent Albums (Official Charts Company)	27
