= Victims of the Riddle =

Single by Toyah

from the album Sheep Farming in Barnet
- B-side: "Victims of the Riddle (Vivisection)"
- Released: April 1979
- Recorded: 1979
- Studio: Chappell Studios, London
- Genre: New wave
- Length: 3:38
- Label: Safari
- Songwriter(s): Toyah Willcox; Keith Hale; Steve James; Joel Bogen; Peter Bush
- Producer(s): Steve James; Keith Hale

Toyah singles chronology
"Victims of the Riddle" (1979)	"Neon Womb" (1979)

"Victims of the Riddle" is a song by the English new wave band Toyah, fronted by Toyah Willcox, released as the band's debut single in 1979 by Safari Records. The song later featured on the band's album Sheep Farming in Barnet.

== Background ==
The song was written by Toyah Willcox, Keith Hale, Steve James, Joel Bogen and Peter Bush, and produced by James and Hale. Willcox has hinted that there was some friction within the band over the authorship, implying that even though she composed the music, it was eventually credited to another member of the band after he, out of jealousy, had threatened to leave the band. The song was recorded at the Chappell Studios in London and started as an experiment in which Willcox used her voice as an instrument. Her 20-minute vocal improvisation was then edited down to accommodate a shorter song length. The track incorporated synthesizer music which at that time was becoming more and more prominent.

Releasing "Victims of the Riddle" as the band's first single was the vocalist's choice. "I wanted to be as weird and far away from the mainstream as possible. In fact, being weird was my priority. (...) Subject wise [the song is] still just as off the wall and interesting", Willcox remarked in 2011. The single courted controversy due to its intentionally disturbing front cover image — a photograph of one of the mummies of Guanajuato in Mexico (from a book by Ray Bradbury entitled The Mummies of Guanajuato), holding a note which asked "Is there a heaven? Is there a hell? Do both exist? Who can tell?". This was drawn over the original inscription, which bore the name of the actual mummy — Magdalena Aguilar, and her date of burial which was 8 September 1897. Her mummified body was exhumed on 27 December 1909.

NME gave the song a mixed review, describing it as "[a]ngry and powerful, (...) riotously and genuinely performed. But painful and disappointing too, after all the pre-release build up". The song and its B-side, "Victims of the Riddle (Vivisection)", were later included on the band's first album, Sheep Farming in Barnet. They also featured on the 2005 compilation album The Safari Singles Collection Part 1: 1979–1981.

== Track listing ==
- 7" single

A. "Victims of the Riddle" (Toyah Willcox, Keith Hale, Steve James, Joel Bogen, Peter Bush) – 3:38
B. "Victims of the Riddle (Vivisection)" (Willcox, Hale, James, Bogen, Bush) – 3:57

Side A ran at 45 rpm, while the lengthier side B ran at 33 rpm.

== Personnel ==
- Toyah Willcox – vocals
- Joel Bogen – guitar
- Mark Henry – bass
- Steve Bray – drums
- Peter Bush – keyboards

== Charts ==
Chart (1980)	Peak position
UK Independent Singles	7
