= The Blue Meaning =

Studio album by Toyah
- Released: June 1980
- Recorded: 1980
- Studio: Parkgate Studios, Battle
- Genre: New wave; punk rock
- Length: 41:19
- Label: Safari
- Producer: Steve James; Toyah

Toyah chronology
Sheep Farming in Barnet (1979)	The Blue Meaning (1980)	Toyah! Toyah! Toyah! (1980)

Singles from The Blue Meaning
- 1. "Ieya" Released: 1980

Professional ratings
Review scores
Source	Rating
Smash Hits	3/10

The Blue Meaning is the second studio album by the English new wave band Toyah, fronted by Toyah Willcox, released in 1980 by Safari Records. It reached the Top 40 on the UK Albums Chart.

== Background ==
The album was recorded at the Parkgate Studios in Battle, East Sussex and mixed at the Marquee Studios in London. The album's title comes from blue being one of Toyah's favourite colours, which the singer finds deeply spiritual, with multiple cultural associations. The album cover features a photo taken by Gered Mankowitz at night in front of a Gothic mansion Wykehurst Place, located in Bolney near Brighton. It pictures Toyah Willcox dressed in a maid outfit and wearing ballet shoes, tied to one of the entrance pillars. Other band members are pictured on the mansion's balconies.

The only single taken from the album was "Ieya", backed with "The Helium Song", which was in fact an extended version of the album track "Spaced Walking", recorded as Toyah inhaled helium to give her vocals a 'squeaky' demeanor (she can be heard inhaling between lines). The album was Toyah's first entry on the national UK Albums Chart where it reached number 40. It was also the band's second number 1 on the UK Independent Albums Chart.

The Blue Meaning saw its first release on CD in 1990 on the Great Expectations label, and was reissued in a double CD package with Sheep Farming in Barnet by Safari Records in 2002. The latter release was remastered and included two bonus tracks. In May 2021, Cherry Red Records released the album in an expanded deluxe edition, consisting of 2 CDs with rarities and previously unreleased bonus material, and a DVD including an interview, new live performances and archive footage, as well as on a pink vinyl. Following the re-release, The Blue Meaning re-entered the national UK Albums Chart as well as the Independent Albums Chart. It also reached number 1 on the UK Rock & Metal Albums and number 12 on the UK Physical Albums Chart.

== Lyrical content ==
Willcox said that the lyrics of the opening song, "Ieya", are about "mankind meeting (...) the higher intelligence that put us here", referring to panspermia and the ancient astronauts theory, while the title itself came about by using syllables as a way of expression and the voice as an improvisational instrument. "Spaced Walking" references the psychedelic music of the 1960s. Willcox reflected that "it's about opening the doors of perception. I was heavily into William Burroughs then. (...) It's about just altering reality".

The song "Mummies" was inspired by the mummies of Guanajuato and Toyah's interest in the genre of horror and psychopathic thrillers. Willcox explained that "Blue Meanings" is "about the beginning of the Industrial Revolution. It's also possibly about a dystopian future when man has no longer got importance as individuals but is more important as groups of people without autonomy. So it's about that bleakness. It's about being bred for a reason, so churning children in and out of factories purely for economic reasons. (...) [It] is just about the industrialization of the human race".

Referring to "Insects", Willcox said: "whenever I walked by the audience there would be hands clambering all over my body and I just thought 'Urgh – insects, insects!'. But on stage I go to the audience and just let them rip me to pieces. (...) They want to grab my body and do vulgar things. They want to fantasize about me which is fine because that's what my music is, it's pure fantasy". The subject also inspired the lyrics to "Love Me" which Toyah said is about "accepting abuse and also controlling someone via their abuse. (...) I was touched so much, physically touched by the audience" as well as her inability to have close relationships at that time due to shyness and distrust. She said: "It's kind of a question, 'Do you love me? Is this love?', (...) exploring what is love and what expresses love".

The closing track, "She", was influenced by the Danse Macabre motive and Toyah's bad memories from her school days when she was mocked for her speech impediment and how she looked. "The anger [in the song] is a back-reference to the misappropriation of behaviour that I experienced in the education system, at school. I was touched too much, I was pushed too much, I was chastised too much, I was mocked too much", Willcox reflected in 2020.

== Track listing ==
=== Original release ===
Side one

1. "Ieya" (Toyah Willcox, Joel Bogen, Pete Bush) – 8:15
2. "Spaced Walking" (Willcox, Bush) – 2:20
3. "Ghosts" (Willcox, Bogen, Bush, Charlie Francis) – 3:29
4. "Mummies" (Willcox, Bogen, Bush, Francis) – 2:58
5. "Blue Meanings" (Willcox, Bogen, Bush) – 5:03

Side two

6. "Tiger! Tiger!" (Willcox, Steve Bray, Bogen, Francis, Bush) – 3:19
7. "Vision" (Willcox, Bogen, Bush) – 4:06
8. "Insects" (Willcox, Bogen, Bush) – 2:44
9. "Love Me" (Willcox, Bogen, Bush) – 3:02
10. "She" (Willcox, Bray, Bogen, Francis, Bush) – 6:03

2002 CD edition bonus tracks

11. "Sphinx" (Willcox, Bogen) – 3:16
12. "Street Addict" (Willcox, Bogen, Phil Spalding) – 5:36

=== 2021 expanded deluxe edition ===
CD one – The Blue Meaning

1. "Ieya" – 8:15
2. "Spaced Walking" – 2:21
3. "Ghosts" – 3:20
4. "Mummies" – 2:55
5. "Blue Meanings" – 5:03
6. "Tiger! Tiger!" – 3:11
7. "Vision" – 4:07
8. "Insects" – 2:49
9. "Love Me" – 3:01
10. "She" – 6:03

Bonus tracks

11. "Silence Won't Do" – 2:04
12. "Jack & Jill" – 3:00
13. "Cotton Vest" – 2:33
14. "The Merchant & the Nubile" – 3:18
15. "Danced" (Session Version) – 5:24
16. "Last Goodbye" (Session Version) – 3:46
17. "Love Me" (Session Version) – 3:11
18. "Ieya" (Session Version) – 5:11
19. "Helium Song (Spaced Walking)" – 3:37

CD two – Rare & Archive Material

Live at ICA London September 1980

1. "Love Me" (Live at ICA London) – 3:08
2. "Waiting" (Live at ICA London) – 2:30
3. "Ieya" (Live at ICA London) – 7:50

Park Gates Studios April 1980

4. "Blue Meanings" (Alternate Vocal) – 5:28
5. "She" (Alternate Vocal) – 6:04
6. "Spaced Walking" (Helium Acapella) – 2:07
7. "Ghost" (Instrumental) – 3:30
8. "Mummies" (Instrumental) – 2:54
9. "Vision" (Instrumental) – 4:10

Park Gates Studios July 1980

10. "Silence Won't Do" (Alternate Vocal) – 2:09
11. "Jack & Jill" (Alternate Vocal) – 3:12
12. "The Merchant & the Nubile" (Alternate Vocal) – 4:40

Blood Donor feat. Toyah Willcox

13. "It's a Mystery" (Original Version) – 4:38

Eel Pie Studios November 1980

14. "Angels & Demons" (Demo) – 5:45
15. "You're My Hero" (Demo) – 5:41
16. "Sphinx" (Instrumental Demo) – 3:07
17. "Walkie Talkie" (Instrumental Demo) – 2:18
18. "Anthem" (Instrumental Demo) – 3:31

DVD – Rare & Archive Footage

Toyah Interviews 2020

1. "The Story Behind the Album"
2. "Track by Track Album Commentary"

Acoustic Session 2020

3. "Ghosts"
4. "Blue Meanings"
5. "Ieya"

Friday Night, Saturday Morning 1980

6. "Danced" (2/11/1980)
7. "Mummies" (2/11/1980)

== Personnel ==
Band members

- Toyah Willcox – verbals & unusual sounds
- Joel Bogen – guitar
- Pete Bush – keyboards, trumpet
- Charlie Francis – bass guitar
- Steve Bray – drums

Production

- Steve James – arrangements, producer, engineer, mixing
- Perry Morgan – assistant engineer
- Bill Smith – art direction, design
- Gered Mankowitz – cover photography

== Charts ==
Chart (1980)	Peak position
UK Albums (Official Charts Company)	40
UK Independent Albums	1

Chart (2021)	Peak position
Scottish Albums	16
UK Albums (Official Charts Company)	59
UK Vinyl Albums	14
UK Independent Albums	4
UK Rock & Metal Albums	1
