= Ieya =

- Original 1980 release cover

Single by Toyah

from the album The Blue Meaning
- B-side: "The Helium Song"
- Released: June 1980
- Recorded: 1980
- Studio: Parkgate Studios, Battle
- Genre: New wave
- Length: 5:13 (single edit); 8:15 (full album version); 3:40 (1982 version)
- Label: Safari
- Songwriters: Toyah Willcox; Joel Bogen; Peter Bush
- Producers: Steve James; Toyah; (1980 version); Nick Tauber (1982 version)

Toyah singles chronology
"Bird in Flight" (1980)	"Ieya" (1980)	"Danced" (1980)
"Brave New World" (1982)	"Ieya" (1982)	"Be Proud Be Loud (Be Heard)" (1982)

Alternative cover
- 1982 re-release cover

"Ieya" is a song by the English new wave band Toyah, fronted by Toyah Willcox. It was first released as a single in 1980 by Safari Records to promote the album The Blue Meaning. It was re-recorded and re-issued in 1982, and met with minor chart success in the UK.

== Background ==
"Ieya" started off as a jam in the soundcheck before the band's concert in Bath, where it was subsequently performed as the fourth encore that night. Toyah recalled that the band "walked on stage and started 'Ieya', and within the first sixteen bars the audience was behaving in a way I'd never seen before. And because 'Ieya' had no real form, we'd only ever jammed it, what should have been a four-minute song went on for twenty minutes, and the audience didn't stop dancing once, and I just kept making up words as I went along. (...) It was a sequence of chords that grew, so every verse had more chords added to it, and it had a fantastically simple chorus, a chant".

The song was written by Toyah Willcox, Joel Bogen and Peter Bush, and produced by Steve James and Willcox. According to the singer, it "is about mankind believing in ourselves so much that we believe we are immortal and can become our own gods, therefore challenging God as the Devil, in the form of the Devil; man being the beast". She later added that it is about "mankind meeting (...) the higher intelligence that put us here", referring to panspermia and the ancient astronauts theory, while the title itself came about by using syllables as a way of expression and the voice as an improvisational instrument. The song's lyrics refer to the Necronomicon, a book that Willcox had been given a year before, and which contains images mirroring her past paranormal experiences.

When the band started recording the song, Willcox recalled, it "turned out to be seven minutes long, which is longer than any average song. But the atmosphere in the studio became terrifying. Just like when The Exorcist was made, things started going wrong. Technical equipment wouldn't work, arguments would start out of nowhere, distrust would enter the studio, and I had a severe problem with writing seven minutes' worth of lyrics in what was a repetitive song. It took days for me to record the vocals. It was a multi-layered song, and the chorus had many voices – all mine. But doing the verses was murder. I hadn't quite learned by this time that the simpler I kept the subject matter and the simpler I kept the phrasing and the words, the more effective the song would be. I always wanted to make things over-complex to try and prove myself".

The single was released in several formats, including three different 7" vinyl releases, and for the first time in Toyah's career, a 12" single. It was pressed in black and white vinyl variations. Its B-side, "The Helium Song", was an extended version of the track "Spaced Walking", which, along with a full-length version of "Ieya", were included on the band's second LP, The Blue Meaning. Both tracks also featured on the 2005 compilation The Safari Singles Collection Part 1: 1979–1981.

"Ieya" was re-recorded in 1982 with a largely new set of musicians, in a distinctly "poppier" style, and produced by Nick Tauber. It was released as a single in the summer of 1982, again backed with "The Helium Song", but in a different picture sleeve, which featured a close-up of the image from the album cover of The Blue Meaning. The single was again available in white and black vinyl variations, but this time because Safari Records allegedly ran out of black vinyl. A shorter edit of the re-recording appeared on promo singles sent to radio stations and used in jukeboxes, but not on any commercial single releases. It later featured on the 1984 compilation Toyah! Toyah! Toyah! All the Hits and a K-tel compilation Chart Heat, which one got free with Chart Beat, or vice versa. The single edit of the re-recording was included on the 1999 CD reissue of The Changeling, while the full length version made its CD debut on the 2005 compilation The Safari Singles Collection Part 2: 1981–1983.

A music video for the song was considered, filming at a point of zero gravity and using a flight simulator to simulate interstellar travel. This was technologically unfeasible at the time, and simulation using green screen techniques would have been too costly. A video for the song was filmed as part of BBC's 6.55 Special in 1982, consisting largely of the band's in-studio performance.

Upon its 1982 re-release, "Ieya" was a moderate success in the UK Singles Chart, peaking at number 48. The song became an ever-present mainstay of Toyah's live sets, and to this day it is rare for Toyah to play a full set and not perform this song, which is always placed at the end of the show. "Ieya" has been re-recorded by Toyah a number of times in her later career: in 1993 on the album Take the Leap!, on Looking Back in 1995, and on The Acoustic Album, again in 1995.

== Track listing ==
7" single (1980)
A. "Ieya" (Toyah Willcox, Joel Bogen, Peter Bush) – 5:13
B. "The Helium Song" (Willcox, Bush) – 3:36

12" single (1980)
A. "Ieya" (Willcox, Bogen, Bush) – 8:14
B. "The Helium Song" (Willcox, Bush) – 3:36

7" single (1982)
A. "Ieya" (Willcox, Bogen, Bush) – 3:40
B. "The Helium Song" (Willcox, Bush) – 3:36

== Personnel ==
1980 version

- Toyah Willcox – vocals
- Joel Bogen – guitar
- Mark Henry – bass
- Steve Bray – drums
- Peter Bush – keyboards

1982 version

- Toyah Willcox – vocals
- Joel Bogen – guitar
- Phil Spalding – bass
- Simon Phillips – drums
- Simon Darlow – keyboards

== Charts ==
Chart (1980)	Peak position
UK Independent Singles	3

Chart (1982)	Peak position
UK Singles (Official Charts Company)	48
UK Independent Singles	5
