= English Evenings =

British duo

- Origin: United Kingdom
- Genres: New wave; synth-pop
- Years active: 1983–1986
- Labels: Safari; WEA; GFM
- Past members: Graham Lee; Lee Walsh

English Evenings were a British new wave and synth-pop duo that formed in 1983. Signed to UK independent label Safari and major label Warner-Elektra-Atlantic (WEA), they released several singles from 1983 to 1986 and their sole studio album After Dark in 1985.

== History ==
Before English Evenings, Lee Walsh was a member of the band Sly Fox, whose name later changed to One Adult. After the band broke up and with its members going their separate ways, Walsh secured a record deal under the name of English Evenings, together with bandmate Graham Lee. They released only one album in 1985, on the Safari Records. Although their producer was the famous audio engineer and producer Phil Harding, they did not meet with much success.

After disbanding, Graham Lee and Lee Walsh went on to later produce a football song for Leeds United in 1990, entitled "We Are Leeds".

== Discography ==
=== Albums ===
- 1985: After Dark

=== Singles ===
- 1983: "English Evenings"
- 1983: "What's the Matter with Helen?"
- 1984: "Touch"
- 1984: "Tear You Down"
- 1985: "I Will Return"
- 1986: "Those Brilliant Teens"
