= Bird in Flight =

Single by Toyah
- B-side: "Tribal Look"
- Released: February 1980
- Recorded: December 1979
- Genre: New wave
- Length: 3:59
- Label: Safari
- Songwriter(s): Toyah Willcox; Charlie Francis; Joel Bogen; Peter Bush; Steve Bray
- Producer(s): Matt Dangerfield

Toyah singles chronology
"Computer" (1980)	"Bird in Flight" (1980)	"Ieya" (1980)

"Bird in Flight" is a song by the English new wave band Toyah, fronted by Toyah Willcox, released as a single in 1980 by Safari Records.

== Background ==
The song was written by Toyah Willcox, Charlie Francis, Joel Bogen, Peter Bush and Steve Bray, and was produced by Matt Dangerfield. Willcox explained that it is "a song of rebellion and getting personal freedom, and not being met with negativity for something you passionately believe", revealing that she wrote it in rebellion against her mother. In 2011, the singer reflected: "I find the lyric excruciatingly wrong. But that might be because I'm older and wiser and prefer what I write today. That said, the Toyah band play it beautifully and they have given it a light, optimistic feel that really lifts the whole set. It dances into the venue and tickles your ears. I just need to ignore the lyric... It's so bloody wrong".

In the UK, "Bird in Flight" was released as a double A-side single with the song "Tribal Look", inspired by the Maasai tribe. Toyah promoted the single with the eponymous UK tour from January to March 1980. NME gave "Bird in Flight" a positive review, describing it as a Patti Smith-influenced "good pop song" with a "desirable spacy atmosphere". Neither track was featured on an album at the time, though both were added to the 2002 reissue of Sheep Farming in Barnet, and also on the 2005 compilation album The Safari Singles Collection Part 1: 1979–1981.

== Track listing ==
- 7" single

A. "Bird in Flight" (Toyah Willcox, Charlie Francis, Joel Bogen, Peter Bush, Steve Bray) – 3:59
B. "Tribal Look" (Willcox, Francis, Bogen, Bush, Bray) – 3:22

== Personnel ==
- Toyah Willcox – vocals
- Joel Bogen – guitar
- Charlie Francis – bass
- Steve Bray – drums
- Peter Bush – keyboards

== Charts ==
Chart (1980)	Peak position
UK Independent Singles	2
