= It's a Mystery (song) =

Single by Toyah

from the album Anthem
- B-side: "War Boys"; "Elocution Lesson"
- Released: 1981
- Genre: New wave
- Length: 4:13
- Label: Safari
- Songwriters: Keith Hale; Toyah Willcox
- Producer: Nick Tauber

Toyah singles chronology
"Danced" (1980)	"It's a Mystery" (1981)	"I Want to Be Free" (1981)

"It's a Mystery" is a song by the English new wave band Toyah, fronted by Toyah Willcox, released as a single in 1981 by Safari Records. The song was a hit in the UK where it peaked in the number 4 in the charts as the lead track on the EP Four from Toyah.

== Background ==
The song was originally written by Keith Hale for the band Blood Donor, but the record company Safari wanted Toyah to record it. Although Toyah Willcox wrote the lyrics of the second verse, she is officially not credited as a co-writer of the song and does not receive royalties for it. In its original form, the track had a 12-minute vocal part and a 28-minute instrumental, but was subsequently given a shorter, more radio-friendly song structure. Initially, Willcox had some reservations about recording the song: "I was slightly against it because it was very feminine, (...) it was vulnerable, it was everything I didn't want to show about myself". She worried that it did not suit her punk rock image and that its mainstream sound might confuse her fanbase. She said: "I had an army of followers and I just knew that this song wasn't for them". In 2011, the singer reflected that the song "was never a favourite of mine but it has given me 30 years in the business, on many levels, as a singer, actress and writer. If I'd just stuck with the indie sound I'd probably never have surfaced above cult popularity".

In the UK, "It's a Mystery" was first available only as the lead song on the 4-track 7" EP Four from Toyah, released in February 1981, which peaked at number 4 in the UK Singles Chart in March 1981. It would give the band their first appearance on Top of the Pops. Despite being Toyah's biggest hit to date, "It's a Mystery" is not officially listed as a chart hit under its actual title, which Toyah has been unsuccessfully trying to rectify. In some territories, however, the song was released as a separate single to promote Anthem.

"It's a Mystery" has been re-recorded by Toyah a number of times in her later career: in 1993 on the album Take the Leap!, on Looking Back in 1995, and twice on The Acoustic Album, again in 1995.

== Track listing ==
- 7" single

A. "It's a Mystery" (Keith Hale) – 4:13
B. "War Boys" (Toyah Willcox) – 3:37

- 7" single (Australia)

A. "It's a Mystery" (Hale)
B. "Elocution Lesson" (Willcox, Joel Bogen)

== Personnel ==
- Toyah Willcox – vocals
- Joel Bogen – guitar
- Phil Spalding – bass
- Nigel Glockler – drums
- Adrian Lee – keyboards
