= Sheep Farming in Barnet =

Studio album by Toyah
- Released: August 1979 (EP); December 1979 (LP)
- Recorded: 1979
- Studio: Chappell Studios, London, Spaceward Studios, Cambridge
- Genre: New wave; punk rock
- Length: 21:11 (EP); 40:30 (LP)
- Label: Safari
- Producer: Steve James; Keith Hale

Toyah chronology
| Sheep Farming in Barnet (1979) | The Blue Meaning (1980) |

EP cover

Singles from Sheep Farming in Barnet
- 1. "Victims of the Riddle" Released: 1979; 2. "Neon Womb" Released: 1979; 3. "Computer" Released: 1980

Professional ratings
Review scores
| Source | Rating |
|---|---|
| Record Mirror | 3/5 stars |

Sheep Farming in Barnet is the debut studio album by the English new wave band Toyah, fronted by Toyah Willcox, released in 1979 by Safari Records.

== Background ==
The album was produced by Steve James and future band member Keith Hale. The album's title refers to an actual sheep farm (College Farm) located in the Finchley area of North London. Toyah said: "I just thought the title of the album should be something that doesn't tie [it] down to a particular style or a particular time. I wanted the title to be obscure. (...) It was an enigmatic name".

The album cover was designed by Bill Smith and features a photo of Toyah Willcox at the RAF Fylingdales radar station near Whitby in Yorkshire, in front of the three radomes, with her head posing as the fourth one. To take the picture at a right angle, they had to break into the high security site which was part of the early warning system. The crew got arrested by the guards and escorted off the site. The back cover featured quotations from the book The Prophecies of Nostradamus, which Toyah had read and was hugely inspired by, and information about vivisection, which she is strongly against.

Sheep Farming in Barnet was originally released in the UK in summer 1979 as a 6-track extended EP, dubbed an 'Alternative Play' record (AP) by Safari Records, and reached number 2 on the UK Independent Singles Chart. It was expanded into a full-length album by EMI Electrola for the German market at the end of 1979, adding five new tracks, including the previously released single "Victims of the Riddle". The importation of the disc was so widespread that Safari decided to cash in and follow suit, and the LP was eventually released in the UK in March 1980, where it would become the band's first number 1 on the UK Independent Albums Chart. "Neon Womb" and "Computer" were released as exclusive singles respectively in Germany and Yugoslavia.

The album was later reissued on CD, cassette and red vinyl by Great Expectations in 1990, and again on CD by Safari themselves in 2002, digitally remastered with two bonus tracks and coupled with the band's second album, The Blue Meaning. In December 2020, Cherry Red Records released the album in an expanded deluxe edition, consisting of 2 CDs with rarities and previously unreleased bonus material, and a DVD including an interview, new live performances and archive footage, as well as on a white vinyl. Following the re-release, Sheep Farming in Barnet charted on the UK Albums Chart for the first time and re-entered the Independent Albums Chart. It also reached number 52 on the UK Physical Albums Chart.

== Lyrical content ==
The lyrics to the opening track, "Neon Womb", were inspired by Toyah's daily early morning journeys on the London Underground, when she would often be the only passenger on the tube train, thus feeling like in a "neon womb". The song also refers to the singer's unresolved relationship with her mother. The track "Computer" was inspired by computer programming which was a new profession at that time, and Toyah's fascination by the idea of using binary code to create a new, digital world and storing information there indefinitely. "Waiting" was written after reading the prophecies of Nostradamus.

"Our Movie" was inspired by a weekend spent with friends in a cottage in Buckinghamshire and their walks in the fields. "Danced" is as much "about the second coming of Christ" as about "the return of an alien that can travel through time dimensions". "Race Through Space" was inspired by predictions for the future, possible technological advancements and space exploration, and is about "imagining what it would be like if we were actually able to regularly go into space, use space, decide to spend part of our lives in space".

== Track listing ==
All songs by Toyah Willcox, Joel Bogen and Peter Bush, except where indicated.

=== Original EP release ===
Side one

1. "Neon Womb" – 4:24
2. "Indecision" (Willcox, Bogen, Bush, Mark Henry) – 2:44
3. "Waiting" (Willcox, Steve Bray) – 3:17

Side two

4. "Our Movie" – 3:04
5. "Danced" – 4:42
6. "Last Goodbye" – 3:00

The EP version of "Danced" has an edited intro; this edited version does not appear on any other release.

=== Original LP version ===
Side one – Heaven

1. "Neon Womb" – 4:24
2. "Indecision" (Willcox, Bogen, Bush, Henry) – 2:44
3. "Waiting" (Willcox, Bray) – 3:17
4. "Computer" – 3:06
5. "Victims of the Riddle" (Willcox, Keith Hale, Steve James, Bogen, Bush) – 3:38
6. "Elusive Stranger" – 4:55

Side two – Hell

7. "Our Movie" – 3:04
8. "Danced" – 5:13
9. "Last Goodbye" – 3:00
10. "Victims of the Riddle (Vivisection)" (Willcox, Hale, James, Bogen, Bush) – 3:52
11. "Race Through Space" – 3:17

2002 CD edition bonus tracks

12. "Bird in Flight" (Willcox, Bogen, Bush, Francis, Bray) – 3:56
13. "Tribal Look" (Willcox, Bogen, Bush, Francis, Bray) – 3:25

=== 2020 expanded deluxe edition ===
CD one – Sheep Farming in Barnet

Heaven

1. "Neon Womb" – 4:26
2. "Indecision" – 2:48
3. "Waiting" – 3:17
4. "Computer" – 3:08
5. "Victims of the Riddle" – 3:39
6. "Elusive Stranger" – 4:57

Hell

7. "Our Movie" – 3:04
8. "Danced" – 5:17
9. "Last Goodbye" – 3:03
10. "Victims of the Riddle (Vivisection)" – 3:56
11. "Race Through Space" – 3:17

Bonus tracks

12. "Gaoler" – 2:42
13. "Bird in Flight" – 4:03
14. "Tribal Look" – 3:26
15. "Love Me" (Dangerfield Session) – 3:06
16. "Tribal Look" (Alternate Mix) – 3:17
17. "Our Movie" (Shoestring Version) – 3:13
18. "Waiting" (Shoestring Version) – 2:33
19. "Neon Womb" (Shoestring Version) – 4:53
20. "Danced" (Shoestring Version) – 5:22

CD two – Rare & Archive Material

Spaceward Studios May 1978

1. "Computers" (Demo) – 3:52
2. "Little Boy" (Demo) – 2:14
3. "Close Encounters" (Demo) – 6:11
4. "Watch Me Sane" (Demo) – 3:48

Spaceward Studios December 1978

5. "Jailer" (Demo) – 4:04
6. "Race Through Space" (Demo) – 3:39
7. "Elusive Stranger" (Demo) – 4:53
8. "Problem Child" (Demo) – 4:03
9. "Israel" (Demo) – 4:45
10. "Christmas Carol" (Demo) – 5:01

Chappell Studios May–June 1979

11. "Race Through Space" (Alternate Mix) – 3:08
12. "Neon Womb" (No Saxophone) – 3:59
13. "Our Movie" (Alternate Mix) – 3:05
14. "Waiting" (Alternate Vocal Mix) – 3:38
15. "Indecision" (Alternate Vocal Mix) – 2:48
16. "Computer" (Alternate Vocal Mix) – 3:42
17. "Vivisection" (Improvisation) – 2:49

Rollerball Studios October 1979

18. "Love Me" (Demo) – 3:19
19. "Tribal Look" (Demo) – 3:43
20. "Guilty" (Demo) – 2:55
21. "Three-Sided Face" (Demo) – 3:08

DVD – Rare & Archive Footage

Toyah Interviews 2020

1. "The Story Behind the Album"
2. "Track by Track Album Commentary"

Acoustic Session 2020

3. "Computer"
4. "Neon Womb"
5. "Bird in Flight"

What's On 1979

6. "Race Through Space" (12/04/1979)
7. "Toyah Interview" (19/04/1979)

The Old Grey Whistle Test 1980

8. "Danced" (04/03/1980)
9. "Indecision" (04/03/1980)

== Personnel ==
- Toyah Willcox – vocals
- Joel Bogen – guitar
- Peter Bush – keyboards
- Keith Hale – keyboards on "Victims of the Riddle" and "Victims of the Riddle (Vivisection)"
- Mark Henry – bass
- Steve Bray – drums

Production

- Steve James, Keith Hale – producers, engineers

== Charts ==
| Chart (1980) | Peak position |
|---|---|
| UK Independent Singles (EP version) | 2 |
| UK Independent Albums (LP version) | 1 |

| Chart (2020) | Peak position |
|---|---|
| UK Albums (Official Charts Company) | 99 |
| UK Independent Albums | 14 |
