= Mummies of Guanajuato =

Mummified bodies in Guanajuato, Mexico

Coordinates: 21.020081°N 101.26643452°W

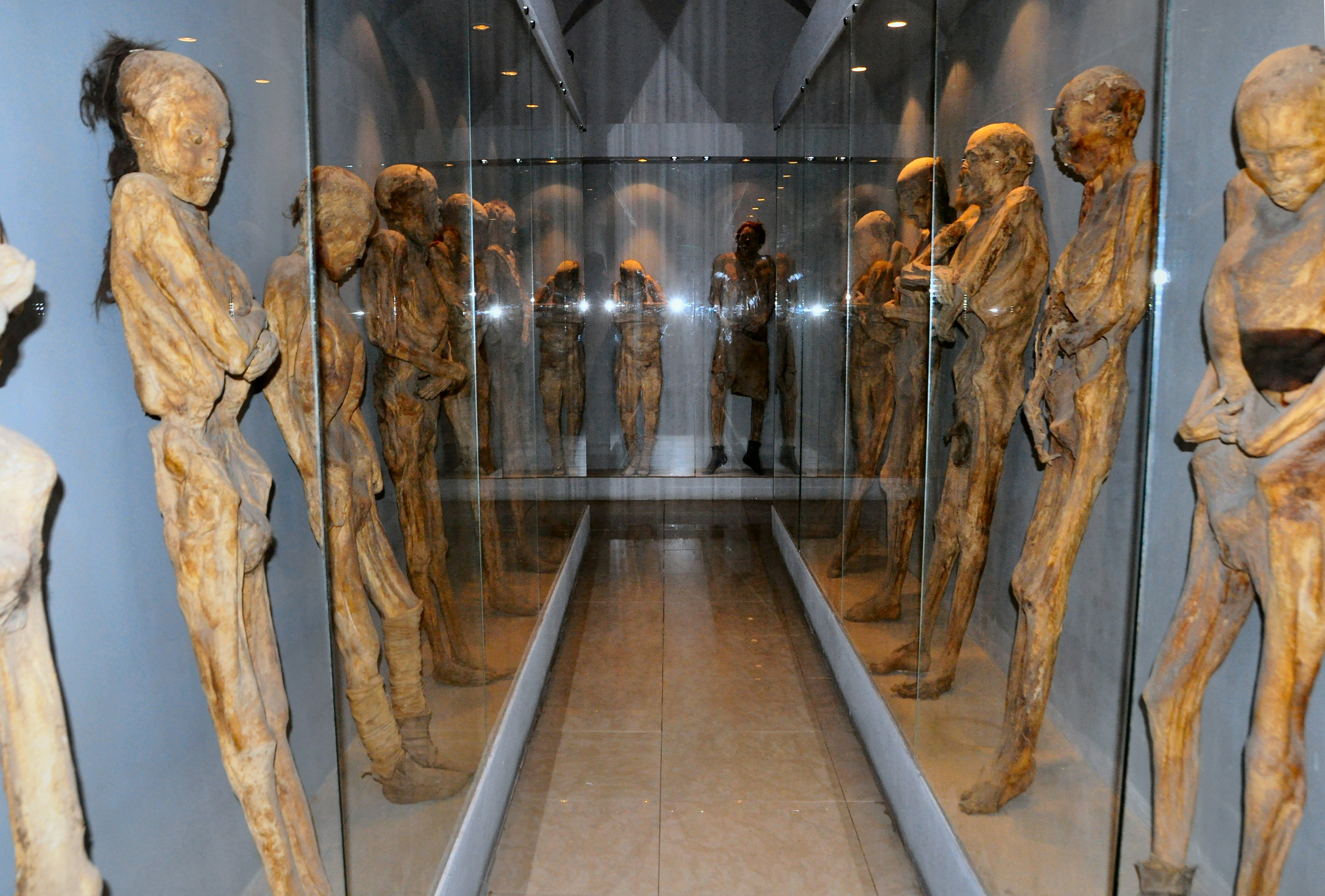
- Several of the mummies on display in 2008
- Type: Collection of mummified human remains
- Discovered: 1865–1958
- Place: Pantheon of Santa Paula, Guanajuato City, Mexico
- Present location: Museum of the Mummies of Guanajuato

The Mummies of Guanajuato are a collection of naturally mummified human remains from Guanajuato City, Mexico. Most were exhumed from the Pantheon of Santa Paula municipal cemetery between 1865 and 1958 after annual burial fees were not renewed. Their exceptional state of preservation led to the creation of the Museum of the Mummies of Guanajuato, where the collection has become a major tourist attraction and a subject of archaeological, forensic and conservation research.

Although the bodies were long regarded as examples of natural mummification produced by the local burial environment, scientific studies have found evidence that some were at least partially embalmed. The museum, established in 1969 beside the cemetery, holds 111 mummies, including men, women, children and infants; as of 2007, 59 were on public display.

== Background ==
The Mummies of Guanajuato originated in the Pantheon of Santa Paula, a municipal cemetery in Guanajuato City that opened in 1861 following the implementation of the Laws of Reform, which required burials to be moved from churchyards to municipal cemeteries for public health reasons. Like many Mexican cemeteries of the period, the Pantheon of Santa Paula contained above-ground burial niches that families retained by paying an annual burial fee. If the fee was not renewed, the remains could legally be exhumed so the burial space could be reused.

== Discovery ==
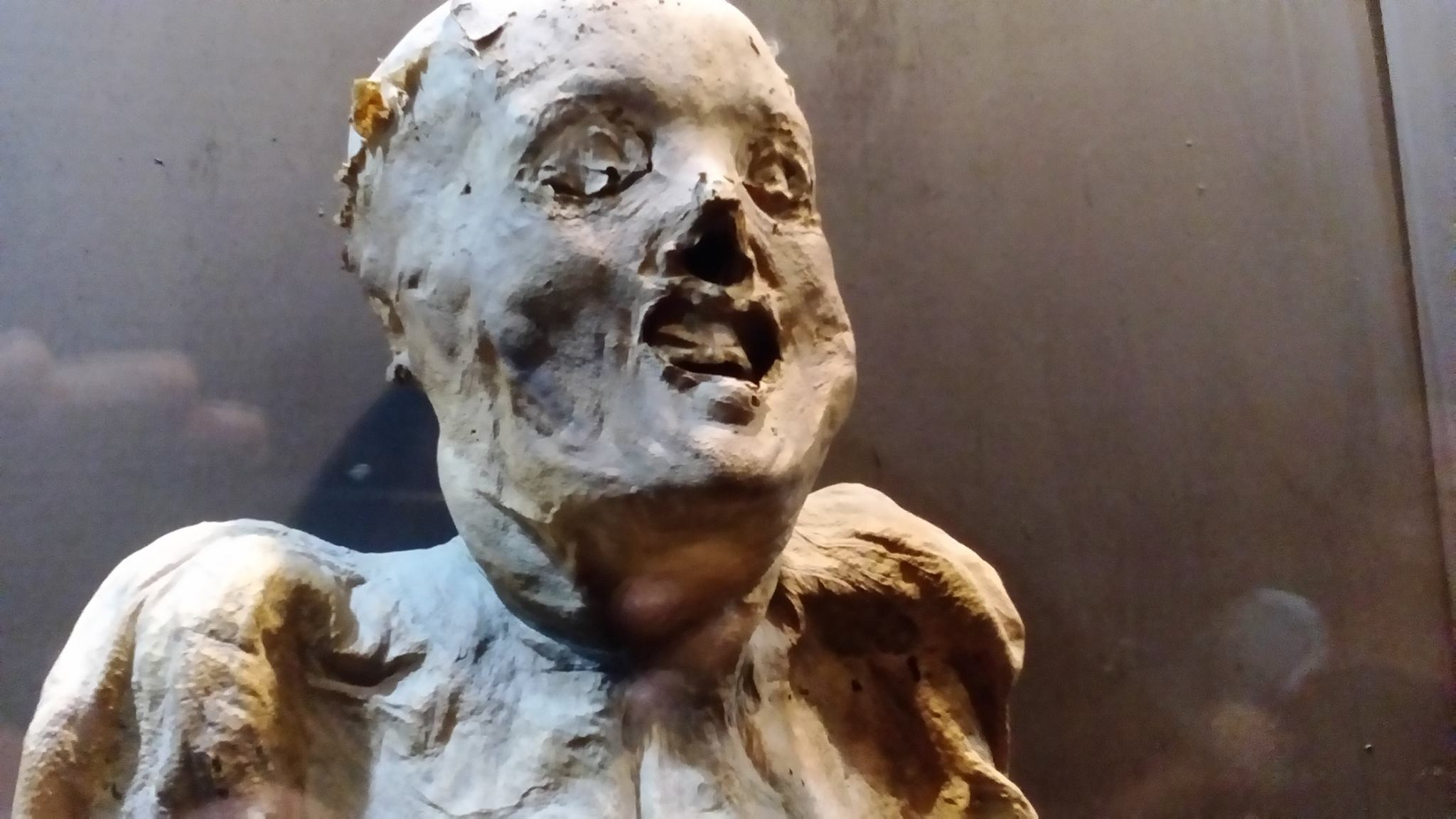
Close-up of the face of one of the Mummies of Guanajuato

In 1865, four years after the Pantheon of Santa Paula opened, cemetery workers began exhuming bodies from burial niches whose fees had not been renewed. Expecting to find only skeletonized remains, they instead discovered that some bodies had been naturally mummified, with their skin, hair and burial clothing still intact. The first mummified body exhumed was that of the French physician Dr. Remigio Leroy, whose remains became the first to be publicly displayed.

The discoveries occurred gradually as individual burial niches were reopened for reuse. Over the following 93 years, until exhumations associated with the burial tax ended in 1958, additional naturally preserved bodies were uncovered. Because of their exceptional state of preservation, cemetery workers retained many of the best-preserved bodies rather than reburying them, gradually forming the collection that later became the Museum of the Mummies of Guanajuato.

== Exhibition ==
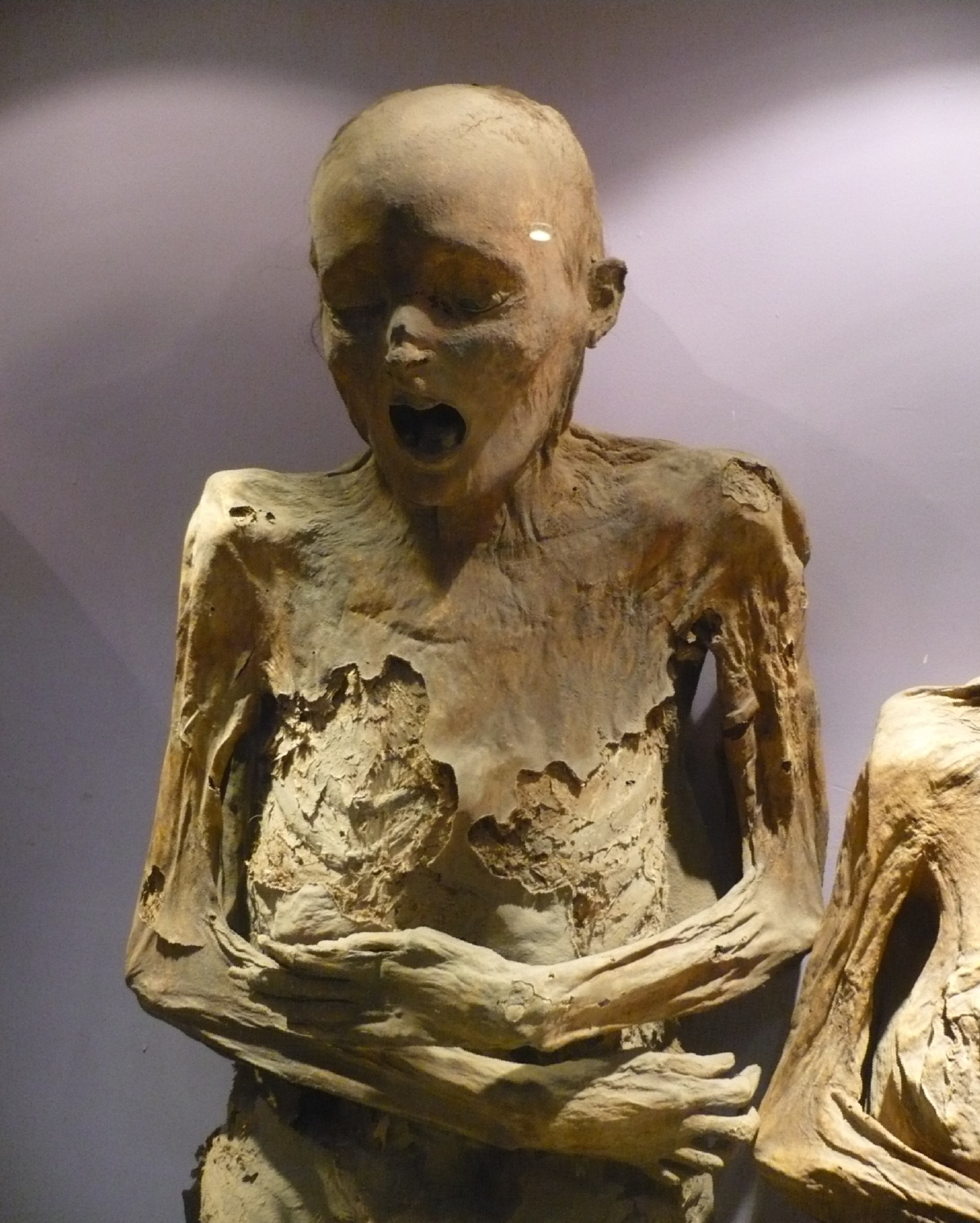
A mummy, 2009

As mummified bodies accumulated during the late nineteenth century, they were stored in a building above the Pantheon of Santa Paula municipal cemetery. By the late nineteenth century, cemetery workers had begun admitting visitors for a small fee, and the collection had become a local tourist attraction.

The Museum of the Mummies of Guanajuato (Spanish: Museo de las Momias de Guanajuato) became home to the collection in 1969. Located beside the cemetery where many of the bodies were first exhumed, the museum displays naturally mummified people of different ages, including men, women, children and infants. As of 2007, 59 of the collection's 111 mummies were on public display.

One of the museum's most famous exhibits is a mummified fetus, often described as one of the smallest mummified human remains on public display. Other exhibits include adults whose clothing, hair and distinctive facial features remain remarkably well preserved.

Selections from the collection have toured internationally, including exhibitions in the United States. These travelling exhibitions have drawn criticism from conservation specialists concerned about the repeated handling and transport of the fragile remains.

== Conservation ==
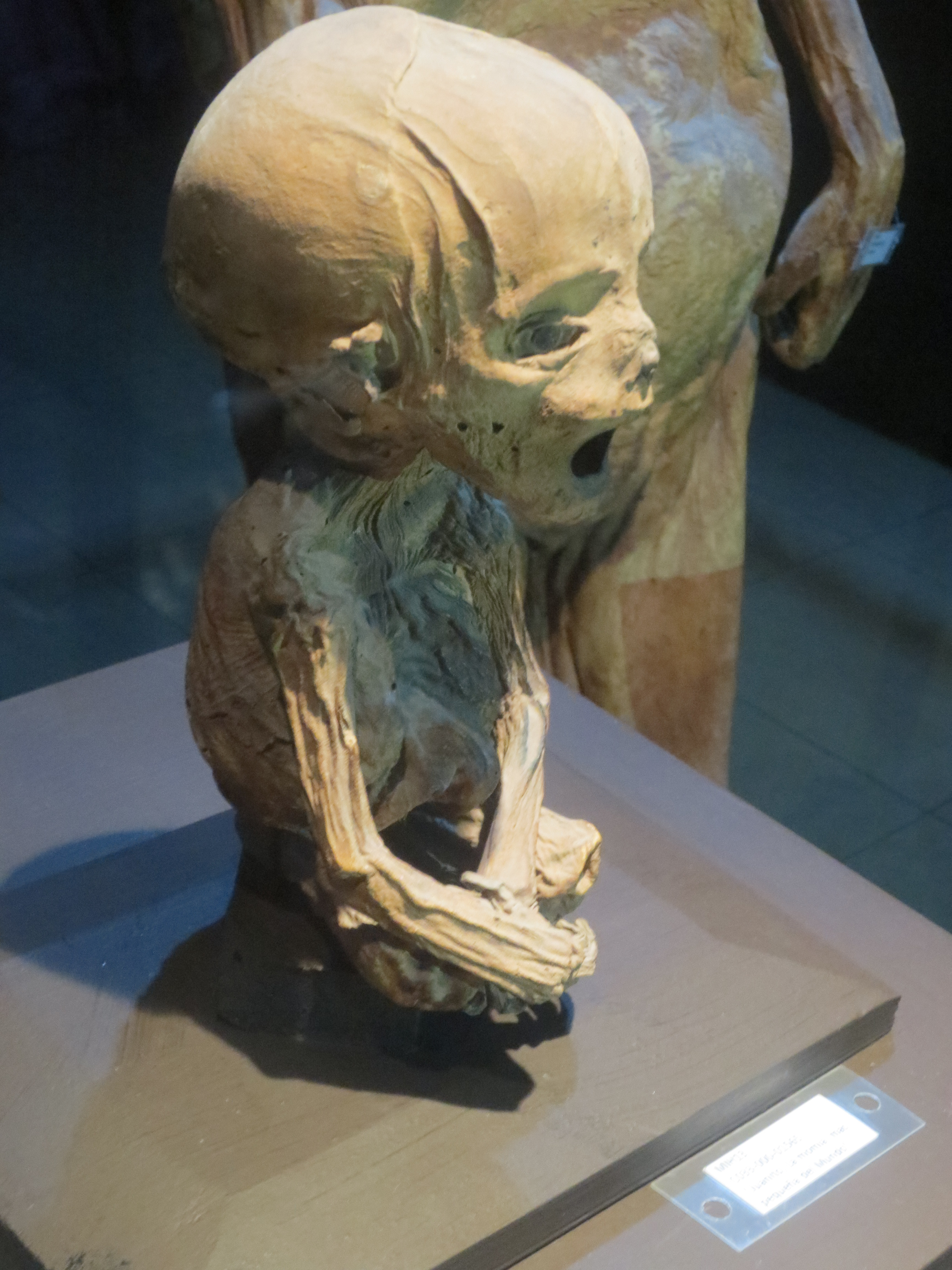
World's smallest baby mummy

The Mummies of Guanajuato have required ongoing conservation since they were first placed on public display in the late nineteenth century. Over the decades, responsibility for their care has been disputed between the municipal government of Guanajuato, which operates the Museum of the Mummies of Guanajuato, and the National Institute of Anthropology and History (INAH), Mexico's federal agency responsible for protecting archaeological and historical heritage. INAH has argued that the mummies form part of Mexico's national patrimony and should be conserved according to professional museum standards, while the municipal government has maintained responsibility for their care and exhibition.

In the years that followed, as the museum's popularity grew, the mummies were transported to temporary exhibitions in Mexico and abroad. INAH argued that repeated handling and transport increased the risk of damage to the fragile remains. Critics also objected when the city exhibited the mummies in one of Guanajuato's underground tunnels during an annual car rally. INAH scholars and other experts also recommended storing the bodies horizontally rather than vertically to improve their long-term preservation.

In 2024, during renovations to the Museum of the Mummies of Guanajuato, museum staff moved one of the mummies as part of the work. While it was being repositioned, an arm detached from the body. INAH accused municipal authorities of failing to follow appropriate conservation protocols and renewed its criticism of the museum's conservation practices. Municipal officials denied that the renovations had caused new damage, arguing that the mummy had deteriorated over many years and that the bodies had been handled by experienced museum staff in accordance with previous INAH recommendaions.

== Public health ==
In 2023, INAH warned that displaying the mummies in traveling exhibitions could pose a public health risk after one of the corpses appeared to have fungal growths.

== In popular culture ==
The mummies are a notable part of Mexican popular culture, echoing the national holiday "The Day of the Dead" (El Día de los Muertos). A B movie titled Santo vs. The Mummies of Guanajuato (1970) pitted the well-known Mexican professional wrestler Santo and several others against reanimated mummies.

Author Ray Bradbury visited the catacombs of Guanajuato with his friend Grant Beach and wrote the short story "The Next in Line" about his experience. In the introduction to The Stories of Ray Bradbury he wrote the following about this story: "The experience so wounded and terrified me, I could hardly wait to flee Mexico. I had nightmares about dying and having to remain in the halls of the dead with those propped and wired bodies. In order to purge my terror, instantly, I wrote 'The Next in Line.' One of the few times that an experience yielded results almost on the spot."

To conjure a morbid and eerie atmospheric opening sequence to his film Nosferatu the Vampyre (1979), German director Werner Herzog used footage he had taken of several of the mummies.

== Other mummies ==
Other locations in Mexico where the mummification process occurs naturally include:

- Encarnación de Díaz, Jalisco
- El Carmen complex, Mexico City
