= Danced =

Single by Toyah

from the album Toyah! Toyah! Toyah!
- B-side: "Ghosts"; "Neon Womb"
- Released: 1980
- Recorded: 17 June 1980
- Genre: New wave
- Length: 5:13 (original album version); 5:30 (live album version)
- Label: Safari
- Songwriter(s): Toyah Willcox; Joel Bogen; Peter Bush
- Producer(s): Nick Tauber

Toyah singles chronology
"Ieya" (1980)	"Danced" (1980)	"It's a Mystery" (1981)

"Danced" is a song by the English new wave band Toyah, fronted by Toyah Willcox. It first appeared on the band's 1979 LP Sheep Farming in Barnet, and a live version of the song was subsequently released as a single in 1980 by Safari Records to promote the concert album Toyah! Toyah! Toyah!.

== Background ==
The song was written by Toyah Willcox, Joel Bogen and Peter Bush. It was originally recorded and released in 1979 on Toyah's first album, Sheep Farming in Barnet, produced by Steve James and Keith Hale.

Willcox explained that the song is "about the second coming of Christ" and later added that it is also about "the return of an alien that can travel through time dimensions, therefore, people living in the gravitational pole of planet Earth are gonna age quicker. Therefore, the two thousand years is a greater expanse of communication".

A live version of "Danced" was released as a single in late 1980, backed with live recordings of "Ghosts" and "Neon Womb". All tracks were recorded by ATV on 17 June 1980 in Wolverhampton for inclusion in a television documentary about Toyah, and most of this concert found its way onto the album Toyah! Toyah! Toyah!, released at the end of the year. The two B-sides from the single, however, were left off the album and for years were only available here. They were later included on the 2005 compilation album The Safari Singles Collection Part 1: 1979–1981, and on the 2006 re-issue of Toyah! Toyah! Toyah!.

== Track listing ==
- 7" single

A. "Danced" (live) (Toyah Willcox, Joel Bogen, Peter Bush)
B1. "Ghosts" (live) (Willcox, Bogen, Bush, Charlie Francis)
B2. "Neon Womb" (live) (Willcox, Bogen, Bush)

== Charts ==
Chart (1980)	Peak position
UK Independent Singles	7
