= Keith Hale =

British musical artist (born 1950)

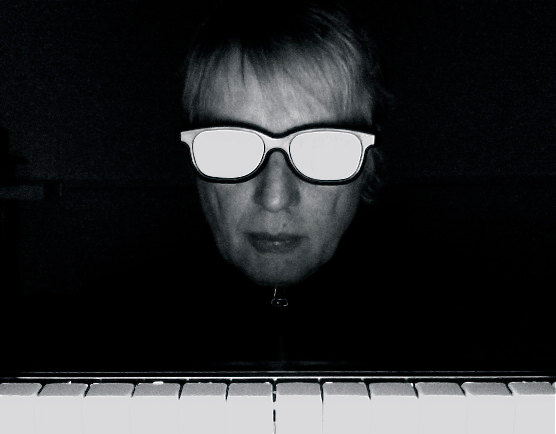

Background information
- Born: 6 November 1950 (age 75)
- Origin: Hull, East Riding of Yorkshire, England
- Died: March 26, 2026 (aged 75)
- Genres: Pop, rock, jazz
- Occupations: Songwriter, record producer, musician
- Instruments: Keyboards; guitar
- Years active: 1969–present
- Labels: Safari, Arista

Keith Hale (born 6 November 1950) is an English songwriter, composer, record producer, performer and music teacher, most notable for his work with Toyah Willcox, Hawkwind and Ginger Baker.

== Biography ==
The Yorkshire-born musician moved south when he was ten. Whilst in his final year at primary school he won first prize in the Cadbury's National Essay Competition for Schools. As a teenager he moved back to Hull to join Nothineverappens "Yorkshire's premier psychedelic band". Returning to London he played in the Bromley based band Aslan (with Geoff Knowles, Tony Fleet and Tony O'Leary), who performed around South London, and at Chislehurst caves and free concerts with David Bowie in the Library gardens, Bromley. He then collaborated in "Silly Balls", a mixed-media project designed to maximise audience participation but this proved too unwieldy to be commercially viable. His distinctive keyboard work and songwriting ability led him to being asked to join Comus in 1973. Later projects included his own band Blood Donor, Hawkwind, and Ginger Baker, before a long and successful association with Toyah. More recently, Hale writes and arranges school music productions, teaches keyboards and participates in songwriting workshops.

== Career ==
=== Comus ===
Comus recorded an album for Virgin Records in 1974 entitled To Keep from Crying. Hale played keyboards and marimba.

=== Blood Donor ===
Determined to pursue his own musical vision, Hale formed Blood Donor in 1977. It had the then highly unusual line-up of two synthesizer players, two percussionists and a bass player. This group battled against a backdrop of punk rock, supported J.J. Burnel, and was signed to Arista Records in 1979. Various producers were used including Steve James and John Cale although they recorded the first album with Tonto's Expanding Head Band and Stevie Wonder producer Malcolm Cecil. Internal disputes between record company and management meant that this album was never released, although two singles were – "Rubber Revolution" and "Rice Harvest". The latter, featuring a Vietnamese children's choir, is regularly revitalised for Hale's school productions.

Blood Donor can be seen performing "Rice Harvest" in the 1980 ATV documentary Toyah, at Toyah Willcox's Battersea warehouse where they frequently rehearsed.

In 2002, they reunited for a one-off 25th anniversary concert which took place at The Old Market in Hove, Sussex.

=== Hawkwind ===
In 1980, Hale joined Hawkwind, replacing Tim Blake who left during the Levitation tour. Together with drummer Ginger Baker, Hale left after a well documented band bust up at Rockfield Studios.

=== Ginger Baker ===
Following Hawkwind, Ginger then asked Hale to get a band together for which he enlisted the help of old friends Billy Jenkins and Ian Trimmer, as well as Blood Donor bassist Rikki Legair. Known as Ginger Baker's Nutters the band undertook two long European tours and recorded two live albums, Live in Milan 1980 and Ginger Baker in Concert. The band broke up when Ginger had to leave the UK for tax reasons.

=== Toyah ===
Hale co-wrote and co-produced Toyah's first album (and EP/AP) Sheep Farming in Barnet and her first single "Victims of the Riddle". In February 1981 her version of Hale's song "It's a Mystery" reached no. 4 in the UK Singles Chart. He then joined Toyah's band for more touring and TV work including Warrior Rock: Toyah On Tour, a double album recorded at the culmination of a 25-date UK tour, during two nights at the Hammersmith Odeon in July 1982. Toyah Willcox had this to say in 2011 – "So when it comes down to Warrior Rock, I know it's one of the best live albums ever made! And I'm confident about that and two fingers to everyone else about it really!".

=== Space Cadets ===
Hale, along with former Blood Donor colleagues John Bentley and Gordon Coxon released one experimental self-titled 'acid-jazz' album in 1988.

=== Jasper Fish ===
Nicknamed Jasper Fish by Ginger Baker (a reference to Hale originating from a fishing city), he recorded two albums in the guise of Jasper Fish and the Alice Band. Alice is the name of Hale's daughter. They supported Jools Holland in 1998, and were described as 'very much in the Canterbury style of the '70s'.

=== Mind Your Head ===
Project with Squeeze bass player and former Space Cadet John Bentley. Performed showcase at Ropetackle, Shoreham, 2 May 2008.

=== Musical director and music tutor ===
In the present day, Hale writes and arranges many children's musical productions in the Kent and London area and teaches keyboards and songwriting at Charles Darwin School. He has participated with members of Squeeze's Chris Difford's songwriting workshops in Italy.

== Discography (selected) ==
=== Singles and EPs ===
- Blood Donor | "Rubber Revolution" / "Chemical Babies" (Arista ARIRV 262 1979)
- Blood Donor | "Rice Harvest" / "Something Happened" (Arista ARIST 279 1979)
- Blood Donor | "Doctor?" / "Soap Box Blues" (Safari SAFE 29 1980)
- Toyah | "Victims of the Riddle" (Safari SAFE 15 1979)
- Toyah | "Sheep Farming in Barnet" (Safari SAP 1 1979)
- Toyah | "Four from Toyah" (Safari TOY1 1981) No. 4 UK

=== Studio albums ===
- Comus | To Keep from Crying (Virgin 1974)
- Blood Donor | The Chappell Tapes (Realvision)
- Hawkwind | Levitation (Bronze 1980)
- Hawkwind | Zones (Flicknife 1983)
- Space Cadets | Space Cadets (Space Cadet SPACAD 1 1989)
- Toyah | Sheep Farming in Barnet (Safari 1C064 1980)
- Toyah | Anthem (Safari VOOR 1 1981) No. 2 UK
- Toyah | Mayhem (Safari VOOR 77 1985)
- Jasper Fish | Around the Room in Eighty Days (GEMS 1998)
- Jasper Fish | Night of the Long Knives (GEMS 1999)
- Alice Hale | In the Real World
- Ian M Hale | Successor

=== Live albums ===
- Ginger Baker | Nutters Live in Milan 1980 (Voiceprint 1981)
- Toyah | Warrior Rock: Toyah On Tour (Safari TNT 201 1982)
- Ginger Baker | In Concert (Onsala ONS2 1987)

=== Compilation albums ===
- Toyah | Toyah! Toyah! Toyah! (K-Tel NE 1268 1984)
- Hawkwind | Epocheclipse (Castle 1999)
- Hawkwind | The Stonehenge Collection (Flickknife 2000)
