= I Want to Be Free (Toyah song) =

Single by Toyah

from the album Anthem
- B-side: "Walkie-Talkie"; "Alien"
- Released: May 1981
- Recorded: 1981
- Studio: Marquee Studios, London
- Genre: New wave
- Length: 3:10
- Label: Safari
- Songwriters: Toyah Willcox; Joel Bogen
- Producer: Nick Tauber

Toyah singles chronology
"It's a Mystery" (1981)	"I Want to Be Free" (1981)	"Thunder in the Mountains" (1981)

Music video
- "I Want to Be Free" on YouTube

"I Want to Be Free" is a song by the English new wave band Toyah, fronted by Toyah Willcox, released as a single in May 1981 by Safari Records. The song promoted Toyah's third studio album Anthem (1981) and was a Top 10 chart hit in the UK and Ireland.

== Background ==
The song was written by Toyah Willcox and Joel Bogen, and produced by Nick Tauber. Willcox explained that it "resonated how I felt about school years which was still very strongly with me even when I was 22". It is about Toyah's frustration as a dyslexic teenager when she was, as she said, "being forced not to be myself, my natural self". The lyric originated when Toyah was fourteen and was developed into the final song in 1981. She further explained that the song is "about seeing the individual, it's about hearing and understanding the individual, not wiping them away from a future just because they can't add up or don't write particularly well. Also, it's about us having the choice".

The single was released in May 1981 only in the 7" vinyl format. There were two variations of the single artwork, with a black or a white border. The two non-album B-sides, "Walkie-Talkie" and "Alien", were eventually included on the 1999 CD reissue of Anthem as well as the 2005 compilation The Safari Singles Collection Part 2: 1981–1983.

Bolstered by the performance of the previous single, "It's a Mystery", and backed by an appearance on Top of the Pops, "I Want to Be Free" entered the UK Top 10 where it would peak at number 8, and helped push the album Anthem into the UK Albums Chart, where it peaked at number 2. It was also Toyah's second number 1 on the UK Independent Singles Chart and the band's most internationally successful single, reaching the Top 10 in Ireland and the Top 40 in Australia and New Zealand, among others. It was eventually certified silver in the UK.

== Music video ==
The music video for the song was directed by Godley & Creme.

== Track listing ==
- 7" single

A. "I Want to Be Free" (Toyah Willcox, Joel Bogen) – 3:10
B1. "Walkie-Talkie" (Willcox, Bogen) – 2:03
B2. "Alien" (Willcox, Bogen, Nigel Glockler) – 3:15

== Personnel ==
- Toyah Willcox – vocals
- Joel Bogen – guitar
- Phil Spalding – bass
- Nigel Glockler – drums
- Adrian Lee – keyboards

== Charts ==
Chart (1981)	Peak position
Australian Singles (Kent Music Report)	35
German Singles (Media Control)	61
Irish Singles (IRMA)	10
New Zealand Singles (RIANZ)	30
South Africa (Springbok Radio)	10
UK Singles (Official Charts Company)	8
UK Independent Singles	1

== Certifications ==
Region	Certification	Certified units/sales
United Kingdom (BPI)	Silver	250,000^{^}
^{^} Shipments figures based on certification alone.
