= Toyah (band) =

English new wave band (1977–1983)

- Origin: England
- Genres: New wave; punk rock
- Years active: 1977–1983
- Label: Safari
- Past members: Toyah Willcox; Joel Bogen; David Robin; Peter Bush; John Windy Miller; Mark Henry; Steve Bray; Charlie Francis; Phil Spalding; Nigel Glockler; Adrian Lee; Keith Hale; Simon Phillips; Simon Darlow; Andy Clark; Preston Heyman; Andy Duncan; Brad Lang; Peter Stroud; Nigel Elliot; Miriam Stockley; Lynn Garner

Toyah was an English new wave band fronted by namesake Toyah Willcox between 1977 and 1983. The only other consistent band member throughout this period was Joel Bogen, Willcox's principal co-writer and guitarist.

== Background ==
Back in the National Theatre, when she was 18, Toyah Willcox felt that was the right environment for her to work out how to put a band together: the theatre was full of musicians as well as actors. "Through a series of coincidences I just got involved in a punk band and that was purely from asking around y’know 'Has anybody got a band, does anyone need a singer?'" she remembered. First Toyah ended up in a punk band from Golders Green, which used to rehearse at Golders Green cemetery and even did a few gigs there.

"The leader of the band was a man called Glen Marks and his father ran Golders Green cemetery. I remember because Marc Bolan died during this period and we hid in one of the gatehouses to watch the funeral. And we went off and we did terrible gigs, I mean really bad gigs and I was a really bad singer and a performer at that point coz ... I was ... it meant so much to me that I was permanently nervous and I’d walk on stage and just become a jibbering wreck and hide behind a kind of ugly bravado, there was no craft there or anything. So I remember we played the Dagenham Ford Motorworks and we played youth clubs all over the place and I realised this was going nowhere fast."

It was Glen Marks, though, who in 1976 introduced Toyah to a protege who was at his school called Joel Bogen, whom she described later as "a very accomplished musician", by far the most accomplished musician that she had met at that time. With Bogen she struck up a writing partnership. In the beginning they met only on Sundays to write songs and answer ads from the NME. Then they joined with a keyboard player called Pete Bush who had a music room in his house in Totteridge where three of them could rehearse. Slowly the band came together "from friends of friends of friends".

== The band Toyah ==
In June 1977, the band played their first gig without a name or a bass player. After several line-up changes, they spent a brief period under the name Ninth Illusion, without recording any music. In the beginning of 1978 they met again and the idea of Toyah the band was born. Bogen auditioned several musicians and chose Pete Bush (keyboards), Dave Robin (drums), and Windy Miller (bass), quartet quickly taking their name from their unusual vocalist and figurehead. Influences on the band included Kraftwerk, Devo, Pere Ubu, the Human League, Julian Cope and Orchestral Manoeuvres in the Dark.

Toyah debuted in Barnet's pub Duke of Lancaster on 27 June, and gave three more concerts in London. On 13 July, the band performed at Young Vic Festival. The band began to record early demos in Willcox's converted warehouse called Mayhem – which comprised offices, recording and rehearsal rooms for many young bands on the London scene of the time.

Early demos recorded during 1978 included songs called "Mother", "Hunger Hill", "Eyes", "Computers", "Gaoler", "Waiting", "Danced", "Neon Womb", "Problem Child", "Little Boy" and "Israel", several of which would make it onto the band's early releases, and several others would emerge on the later rarities compilation Mayhem in 1985. And then a record company offered them a contract. In 1980 Willcox remembered:

"Two years ago we did a gig at the theatre called the ICA theatre and we got amazing reviews for it. The week the reviews came out we had a phone call from Germany and at the time I was making Quadrophenia, I had to rush down to London, do a quick rehearsal for this record company called Safari. They asked us to sign there and then. It meant we could become professional, we'd have regular money coming in, we could do more concerts and things. I wasn't excited because I was worried about record companies being a bit tough and things like that. So now we've had two years experience, we know our capabilities. We know where we want to go and it’s all thanks to Safari allowing us to grow within our own time."

In July 1979, Safari released the band's debut single "Victims of the Riddle", described by the NME as "a remarkably listenable slice of paranoia and macabre". Alongside Willcox, Bogen, and Bush, it featured Mark Henry (bass guitar) and Steve Bray (drums). "Once we were signed I really loved every moment of what happened. We were making a demo virtually once a month, we had to continually produce music, and that was great, because it gave the band focus, it made us feel really good, it put on a retainer 30 quid a week so we felt as if we were employed…", Willcox remembered. The band's next release was an EP marketed as an "Alternate Play" record by their label, entitled Sheep Farming In Barnet, which came out in August 1979 as a six track EP and a full album. The band followed this up with another non-album single, "Bird in Flight / Tribal Look", and their full-length album The Blue Meaning (1980) (No. 40 UK Albums Chart) which one reviewer described as "Patti Smith on speed", another – as "Patti Smith off speed".

=== Commercial success ===
Following Willcox's appearance as punk musician Toola in an episode of the UK TV series Shoestring, ATV filmed the band during this period, both off-stage and on. The result was a hit documentary watched by 10 million viewers, propelling Toyah into the mainstream, and the live album Toyah! Toyah! Toyah! (1980) at No. 22 in the UK Albums Chart.

By this time it became clear that Willcox, rather than her band members, was getting the attention from the press. "I can't help it if I have so much charisma I wipe four blokes off the stage – I don't believe that's true. If people prefer watching me it's not through my doing. I’d say – all due respect to the band – I work harder than any of them and it's up to them to keep up with me if they want as much publicity as I get", she argued in 1980. "When anything went wrong with the band a particular member would say it was because Toyah was acting. Which was a load of crap. So the band would go out, make mistakes, not rehearse enough, lose money, and they'd blame it on me because I was away acting. They couldn't live without me. They were totally dependent on me, so that overworked me. I was having to mother them the whole time. Which was ridiculous. They were like a bunch of old women, continually having periods as far as I was concerned", she told Paul Morley, adding that the group resented the attention she was getting, her tendency to want to write the music, the time she was away pursuing a role that created her image and diminished theirs.

==== The line-up change ====
In 1981, the line-up changed, with only Willcox and Bogen remaining for the band's next set of releases. They were joined by Phil Spalding on bass, Nigel Glockler on drums and Adrian Lee on keyboards, and released the hit EP Four from Toyah, the lead-track from which is a cover called "It's a Mystery" – originally recorded by Sheep Farming in Barnet's producer Keith Hale and his band Blood Donor. "When I first heard 'It's a Mystery' I thought it wasn't for me. It was written by a friend called Keith Hale for a band called Blood Donor and the record company wanted me to cover it…" Toyah remembered. She hated it, thinking it was the end of her career, "of four brilliant years' work as a credible rock artist... Because I'd worked from 1977 right up to 1980 and I had an army of followers and I just knew this song wasn't for them", she added. But the song proved to be a major success, and subsequent promotion pushed the EP to No. 4 in the UK singles charts.

The album it was taken from, entitled Anthem (1981), reached No. 2 that same year, and also featured the hit "I Want to Be Free", which charted highly in the UK (No. 8), Ireland (No. 10) and South Africa (No. 10). "It was resonated with how I felt about my school years which was very strong even if I was only 22", Toyah said later. The singer felt "We Are" might have been released as a single too. "I think history would have been re-written and we would have played Wembley in 1982 instead of Hammersmith for two nights. This was discussed between Safari and the promoters, that I could have been the first female artist to play Wembley Arena, but everyone played safe. Back then there would have been an audience backlash if we released three songs off the same album, we'd have been accused of ripping the fans off, it just wasn't done", she said in 2011.

A non-album single, "Thunder in the Mountains", also hit the No. 4 spot. "In 'Thunder in the Mountains' I wanted to be Bodicea, set in the future, a woman breaking free… everything I did that year was on the concept of breaking free", Toyah commented later. The Four More from Toyah EP followed, with its lead track "Good Morning Universe". This introduced Simon Phillips on drums (having previously played for Judas Priest and Brian Eno), who had replaced Nigel Glockler (who had left to join Saxon who were prominent on the New wave of British heavy metal circuit). "Simon Phillips joining the band certainly changed me and Joel, he was so totally bloody awesome. He raised the bar and gave the band huge credibility", Willcox later remarked. Both Phillips and Spalding later were quoted to mention their time with the band Toyah as being a turning point for them as musicians. "We were a great band. We had a kind of ESP on stage. For many musicians, they are told what they can and can't play and above all must never shine above the lead singer. With me I want a solid team where all the members are unique and I think this is why Phil and Simon enjoyed the experience", Willcox said.

Now seeing Adrian Lee's keyboard duties taken over by newcomer Simon Darlow and Joel Bogen, the band recorded a much darker gothic album entitled The Changeling (1982). The album, made at the times Toyah described as being the hardest for her, was still a success, as was lead single "Brave New World", but neither reached the heights of their predecessors, and a follow-up single announced as "Dawn Chorus" never materialised – a new track, "Be Proud Be Loud (Be Heard)" emerging instead. The album was followed by a tour, captured on the double live album Warrior Rock: Toyah on Tour (1982).

==== Split ====
The final Toyah album, Love Is the Law, followed in 1983, and again saw another line-up change, with only Willcox, Bogen and Darlow remaining. Phillips had been replaced by Andy Duncan, and Spalding shared bass duties with Brad Lang: both Phillips and Spalding had moved on to work with Mike Oldfield. Singles from the album failed to chart highly with the band's final single, "The Vow" (1983), peaking at No. 50.

Willcox and Bogen parted ways the following year – the pair writing several songs which never reached the recording studio, and Bogen co-writing one song for Toyah's debut solo album Minx in 1985. Toyah herself had left Safari at this point, after being signed to CBS offshoot Portrait Records as a solo artist. Safari released the rarities compilation Mayhem (1985) – featuring demos and unreleased songs – however, this was done without Toyah's consent or knowledge – she found out about the album by spotting it on import in a record store in America. The Mayhem compilation issued by Safari in 1985, was an un-authorised release. "Of all the albums I wish had not been released 'Mayhem' is the one. It's sub standard, with songs not intended for release. In fact it makes my blood boil when I think of the plain exploitation of this album, but hopefully it never sold many copies. The songs on it were rehearsal demos, never intended for anything other than workshopping ideas", Willcox said later.

Nigel Glockler joined Saxon where he stayed for many years. Simon Phillips was already a session musician when he joined Toyah and remains so. Phil Spalding became a session bassist and played bass with GTR. Toyah Willcox started her successful solo career. Her first album Minx was more a pop-oriented than her previous works; later she took a more experimental approach (Prostitute), collaborating on several records with her husband, Robert Fripp, and in 2000s returned to her late-1970s roots (Velvet Lined Shell, In the Court of the Crimson Queen). There were discussions regarding a Toyah band reunion in the late 1990s-early 2000s, but the project never got off the ground.

In 2020, the Sheep Farming in Barnet album was released as an expanded deluxe edition by Cherry Red Records, containing the original album, and demos and previously unreleased material as bonus material. It also includes a DVD with interviews and performances of the songs off the album from 1979 and 1980, as well as acoustic interpretations of several of the songs recorded in 2020.

== Band members ==
- Toyah Willcox – vocals (1978–1983)
- Joel Bogen – guitars (1978–1983)
- David Robin – drums (1978)
- Peter Bush – keyboards (1978–1980)
- John Windy Miller – bass (1978–1979)
- Dennis Andress – drums (1978–1979)
- Mark Henry – bass (1979–1980)
- Steve Bray – drums (1979–1980)
- Charlie Francis – bass (1980)
- Andy Prince – bass (1980)
- Nigel Widdowson – drums (1980)
- Phil Spalding – bass (1980–1983)
- Nigel Glockler – drums (1980–1981)
- Adrian Lee – keyboards (1980–1981)
- Miffy Smith – keyboards (1982)
- Simon Phillips – drums (1981–1982)
- Simon Darlow – keyboards (1983)
- Andy Clark – keyboards (1982)
- Preston Heyman – drums (1982)
- Andy Duncan – drums (1982–1983)
- Brad Lang – bass (1983)

== Discography ==
- Sheep Farming in Barnet (1979)
- The Blue Meaning (1980)
- Anthem (1981)
- The Changeling (1982)
- Love Is the Law (1983)
