= Adrian Lee (musician) =

English musician

- Born: 9 September 1957 (age 68)
- Origin: London, England
- Genres: Pop
- Instruments: Keyboards; guitar; backing vocals
- Years active: 1978–present
- Formerly of: Mike and the Mechanics; Toyah

Adrian Lee (born 9 September 1957, London, England) is an English musician known for his work with several well-known acts of the 1980s.

== Career ==
Lee was first signed to Phonogram Records in the late 1970s as guitarist with the band Red Hot. They released one single, "L-L-Lazy Days" (1976), which was produced by Mutt Lange.

In 1978 Lee played keyboards on "Love Deluxe", a vocal single by the British rock/pop group the Shadows, and can be seen in the promotional video for the record. He also played on the single's b-side, "Sweet Saturday Night". Lee's first big engagement led him to play guitar and keyboards on Cliff Richard's 1979 tours, and his 1979 album, Rock 'n' Roll Juvenile. In 1980, Lee became a member of the British new wave band Toyah, co-writing songs including the hit single, "Thunder in the Mountains", and he stayed with them until 1982. The same year he released his only solo album, called The Magician. He continued to write for Toyah Willcox, and appeared on her 1985 album, Minx, for which he and Wilcox wrote "Soldier of Fortune, Terrorist of Love". Minx was produced by Christopher Neil. Neil asked Lee to play on the first Mike + The Mechanics album. Lee was a member of Mike + The Mechanics until 1995.

Lee continued to write, produce and perform with other artists throughout his period with the Mechanics. In 1985, Lee was involved with the production, writing, and keyboards for Space Monkey, and he recorded on albums with artists such as Silent Running on the album Deep (1989), Stephen Bishop, Joan Armatrading, Chris de Burgh and 10cc. Lee is credited as co-producer on 10cc's 1995 album, Mirror Mirror.

Lee composed the music for CITV's 1994 series The Ink Thief, a comedy, science fiction, thriller starring Richard O'Brien and Toyah Willcox.

More recently, Lee has worked on film scores, such as The Reckoning, The Medallion and Training Day.
