= Safari Records =

UK independent record label

Safari Records was a British independent record label based in London, England, and operating between 1977 and 1985. Safari Records was formed early in 1977 by Tony Edwards (former co-manager of Deep Purple), Andreas Budde (the son of German music publisher Rolf Budde) and John Craig who previously ran Purple and Oyster Records. With the label's founders living in Paris, Berlin and London respectively, the plan was to develop a pan-European record company that would release pop records. Licensing deals were struck with Teldec in Germany and Disques Vogue in France, in the UK its product was pressed and distributed by Pye and later by Spartan Records. Most notable of the label's acts were Wayne County, The Boys, Toyah and the South Africa's first multiracial band Juluka.

== Select discography ==
- Wayne County & the Electric Chairs, "Fuck Off" (7", 1977)
- Tyrone Ashley, Looks Like Love Is Here To Stay (12", 1977)
- The Chanter Sisters, Ready For Love (LP, 1977)
- Glenn Hughes, Play Me Out (LP, 1977)
- ELF, Trying To Burn The Sun (LP, 1977)
- Wayne County & The Electric Chairs, Storm The Gates of Heaven (LP, 1978)
- Wayne County & The Electric Chairs, Man Enough To Be A Woman (LP, 1978)
- The Chanter Sisters, "Can't Stop Dancing" / "Back on the Road" (7"/12", 1978)
- Toyah, Sheep Farming in Barnet (1979)
- Glenn Hughes, "I Found A Woman" (7", 1979)
- Toyah, "Victims of the Riddle" (7", 1979)
- Teenbeats, "I Can't Control Myself" (7", 1979)
- Wayne County & the Electric Chairs, "Berlin" (7", 1979)
- Yobs, "The Rub-A-Dum-Dum"/"Another Christmas" (7", 1979)
- The Boys "You Better Move On" / "Schoolgirls" (7", 1980)
- Various, Uppers on the South Downs - Mod revival Compilation - UPP1 - Feat. The Teenbeats, The Same, Missing Persons, The South Coast Ska Stars (12", 1980)
- Toyah, "Bird in Flight" / "Tribal Look" (7", 1980)
- Toyah, The Blue Meaning, (LP, 1980)
- Toyah, Toyah! Toyah! Toyah! (LP, 1980)
- The Boys, Boys Only (LP, 1980)
- The Boys, To Hell with the Boys (LP, 1980)
- Gary Holton, "Ruby (Don't Take Your Love To Town)" (7", 1980)
- Toyah, "Ieya" (7", 1980)
- Toyah, "Danced" (7", 1980)
- Genocide, Images of Delusion (7", 1980)
- Toyah, "It's A Mystery" (7" 1981)
- Toyah, "I Want To Be Free" (7", 1981)
- Toyah, Anthem (LP, 1981)
- Weapon of Peace, Weapon of Peace (LP, 1981)
- Weapon of Peace, "Jah Love"/"Suspicion"/"West Park" (12", 1981)
- Toyah, "Stand Proud" (Flexi, S/Sided) 1981
- Toyah, Four From Toyah (7", 1981)
- Purple Hearts, "My Life's A Jigsaw" (7", 1981)
- Toyah, "Thunder in the Mountains" (7", 1981)
- Weapon of Peace, "Jah Love" (7", 1981)
- Those French Girls, "Close-Up" (7", 1981)
- Toyah, "Brave New World" (7", 1982)
- Toyah, "Ieya" (7", 1982)
- Toyah, The Changeling (LP, 1982)
- Jayne County / Wayne County & The Electric Chairs, The Best Of...(LP, Compilation, 1982)
- Wayne County & The Electric Chairs, "Berlin"(extended version)/"Midnight Pal"/ Waiting for the Marines(12 Inch Pink Vinyl,1982)
- Juluka, Scatterlings (LP, 1982)
- Those French Girls, "Sorry Sorry" (7"/12", 1982)
- Those French Girls, Those French Girls (LP, 1982)
- Cimarons, "Big Girls Don't Cry" (7", 1982)
- Toyah, "Be Proud Be Loud (Be Heard)" (7", 1982)
- Toyah, Warrior Rock (LP, 1982)
- Juluka, "Umbaqanga Music" (7", 1982)
- English Evenings, "What's The Matter With Helen?" (7", 1983)
- Tony Ashton & Lynda Hayes, "Resurrection Shuffle" (7", 1983)
- Toyah, "Rebel Run" (7", 1983)
- Weapon of Peace, Rainbow Rhythm (LP, 1983)
- Wayne County & The Electric Chairs-"Fuck Off"/"Toilet Love" (7" Picture Disc 1983)
- Juluka, "Scatterlings of Africa" (7", 1983)
- Kitty Grant, "Glad To Know You" (7"/12", 1983)
- Toyah, "Rebel Run" (12", 1983)
- Toyah, "The Vow" (7", 1983)
- Kitty Grant, Glad To Know You (12", EP 1983)
- Alan Price, "Clair De Lune" (7", 1984)
- English Evenings, "Tear You Down" (7"/12", 1984)
- Richard Hartley & Michael Reed Orchestra, "The Music of Torvill & Dean" (7", 12", 1984)
- English Evenings, "I Will Return" (7", 1985)
- Jimmy Tarbuck, "Again" (7", 1985)
- La Bouche, "Electric Voice Dance" (7", 1985)
- Roger Glover And Guests, "Love Is All (Butterfly Ball)" (7", 1985)
- The Mr. Men Musical: Little Miss Shy & Mr. Quiet - The Way You Are (7", 45 RPM Side 1 1985)
- The Mr. Men Musical: Mr. Happy - Home For Christmas (7", 45 RPM Side 2 1985)
- Party Time With Mr. Men (LP, 1985)

== See also ==
- List of record labels
