= Joel Bogen =

English guitarist

Joel Bogen (born 3 September 1958) is an English rock and punk guitarist. He worked with Toyah Willcox from the late 1970s to 1983 as the guitar player in her eponymous band and was the co-writer on nearly all of the material they recorded. Bogen also produced Heaven, the 1997 debut album of neo soul artist Jai, for M&G and RCA Records.
