= Toyah Willcox discography =

Toyah discography
- Cover of the 2008 compilation Good Morning Universe – The Very Best of Toyah
- Studio albums: 16
- EPs: 5
- Live albums: 4
- Compilation albums: 12
- Singles: 44
- Video albums: 5
- Music videos: 33
- Collaborative albums: 6

The discography of English musician Toyah Willcox includes releases as part of the band Toyah and as a solo artist, for which she has carried on releasing music credited as Toyah. It also includes Willcox's one-off collaborations with other artists. However, for the discography of The Humans, see § Discography.

As part of Toyah the band, Willcox was signed to independent label Safari Records. Between 1979 and 1983, the band released five studio albums, two live albums, and two extended plays. After launching solo career in 1985, the singer released a further eleven studio albums through various major and independent labels, including Portrait Records, E.G. Records, and Demon Music Group.

To date, Toyah has scored two top 10 albums and three top 10 entries on the UK singles chart. On the UK independent charts, Toyah has scored twelve top 10 album entries and thirteen single entries. Three of her albums and three singles have received sales certifications from the British Phonographic Industry.

== Albums ==
=== Studio albums ===
Title	Details	Peak chart positions					Certifications
Title	Details	UK	UK Indie	AUS	FIN	NOR	Certifications
Sheep Farming in Barnet (Note: Sheep Farming in Barnet did not chart on the UK Albums Chart upon its original release. Chart position is for the 2020 re-issue. EP release of this album had also charted at no. 2 on the Independent Singles Chart in 1979.)	Released: December 1979; Label: Safari	99	1	—	—	—	
The Blue Meaning	Released: 6 June 1980; Label: Safari	40	1	—	—	—	
Anthem (Note: Anthem peaked at no. 2 on the UK Independent Albums Chart upon its original release, and reached no. 1 with the 2022 re-issue.)	Released: 22 May 1981; Label: Safari	2	1	68	30	20	UK: Gold
The Changeling	Released: 7 June 1982; Label: Safari	6	2	—	—	22	UK: Silver
Love Is the Law	Released: 24 October 1983; Label: Safari	28	7	—	—	—	
Toyah solo albums
Minx	Released: 22 July 1985; Label: Portrait	24	7	—	—	—	
Desire (Note: Desire and Prostitute did not chart upon their original releases. Chart positions are for the 2025 re-issues.)	Released: June 1987; Label: E.G.	—	18	—	—	—	
Prostitute	Released: October 1988; Label: E.G.	—	24	—	—	—	
Ophelia's Shadow	Released: February 1991; Label: E.G.	—	—	—	—	—	
Take the Leap! (Note: Take the Leap! did not chart upon its original release. Chart position is for the 2020 re-issue.)	Released: 3 October 1993; Label: Pony Canyon	—	46	—	—	—	
Dreamchild	Released: May 1994; Label: Cryptic	—	—	—	—	—	
Looking Back	Released: 1995; Label: Tring	—	—	—	—	—	
The Acoustic Album	Released: October 1996; Label: Going for a Song	—	—	—	—	—	
Velvet Lined Shell	Released: May 2003; Label: Vertical Species	—	—	—	—	—	
In the Court of the Crimson Queen (Note: In the Court of the Crimson Queen did not chart upon its original release. Chart position is for the 2019 re-issue.)	Released: 15 September 2008; Label: Willow Recordings	74	7	—	—	—	
Posh Pop	Released: 27 August 2021; Label: Demon	22	1	—	—	—	
"—" denotes releases that did not chart or were not released

=== Live albums ===
Title	Details	Peak chart positions		Certifications
Title	Details	UK	UK Indie	Certifications
Toyah! Toyah! Toyah!	Released: 28 November 1980; Label: Safari	22	2	UK: Silver
Warrior Rock: Toyah on Tour	Released: November 1982; Label: Safari	20	1	
Live at the Rainbow	Released: 25 November 2022; Label: Cherry Red	100	7	
Live at Drury Lane	Released: 12 May 2023; Label: Cherry Red	—	5	
"—" denotes releases that did not chart or were not released

=== Compilation albums ===
Title	Details	Peak chart positions	
Title	Details	UK	UK Indie
Toyah! Toyah! Toyah! All the Hits	Released: February 1984; Label: K-tel	43	—
Mayhem	Released: February 1985; Label: Safari	—	—
Best of Toyah	Released: February 1994; Label: Connoisseur Collection	—	—
The Very Best of Toyah	Released: 1997; Label: Nectar Masters	—	—
The Best of Toyah: Proud, Loud & Heard	Released: 1998; Label: Music Club	—	—
Live & More: Live Favourites and Rarities	Released: 1998; Label: Connoisseur Collection	—	—
The Safari Records Singles Collection Part 1: 1979–1981	Released: May 2005; Label: Cherry Red	—	—
The Safari Records Singles Collection Part 2: 1981–1983	Released: July 2005; Label: Cherry Red	—	—
Good Morning Universe – The Very Best of Toyah	Released: 30 June 2008; Label: Music Club Deluxe	—	—
Rare, Remixed & Revisited	Released: 28 February 2020; Label: Demon	—	—
Toyah Solo (box set)	Released: 28 February 2020; Label: Edsel	—	10
Mesmerised: Rarities & Remixes 85–94	Released: 12 June 2021; Label: Demon	—	—
Chameleon - The Very Best Of Toyah	Released: 5 September 2025; Label: Cherry Red Records	—	9
"—" denotes releases that did not chart or were not released

=== Collaborative albums ===
Title	Details
The Lady or the Tiger?	Released: 1986; Label: E.G.; Collaboration with Robert Fripp, featuring The League of Crafty Guitarists
Kneeling at the Shrine	Released: 1991; Label: E.G.; As part of the one-off collaboration Sunday All Over the World
Kiss of Reality	Released: 1993; Label: M+D; Collaboration with German progressive rock trio Kiss of Reality
Cabaret	Released: 1997; Label: Castle Pulse; Collaboration with Nigel Planer; music and songs from the musical Cabaret
Vampires Rock	Released: 2009; Label: Unsung; Collaboration with Steve Steinman; music and songs from the musical Vampires Rock
This Fragile Moment	Released: November 2009; Label: Unsung; Collaboration as part of This Fragile Moment

== EPs ==
Title	Details	Peak chart positions			Certifications
Title	Details	UK	UK Indie	IRE	Certifications
Four from Toyah	Released: February 1981; Label: Safari	4	1	—	UK: Silver
Four More from Toyah	Released: November 1981; Label: Safari	14	1	13	
Little Tears of Love	Released: April 2002; Label: Vertical Species	—	—	—	
Winter in Wonderland	Released: 8 December 2013; Label: Vertical Species	—	—	—	
Has God Ceased to Dream You	Released: 13 December 2014; Label: Vertical Species	—	—	—	
"—" denotes releases that did not chart or were not released

== Singles ==
Year	Title	Peak chart positions						Album
Year	Title	UK	UK Indie	AUS	GER	IRE	NZ	Album
1979	"Victims of the Riddle"	—	7	—	—	—	—	Sheep Farming in Barnet
1979	"Neon Womb"	—	—	—	—	—	—	Sheep Farming in Barnet
1980	"Computer"	—	—	—	—	—	—	Sheep Farming in Barnet
1980	"Bird in Flight"	—	2	—	—	—	—	Non-album single
1980	"Ieya"	—	3	—	—	—	—	The Blue Meaning
1980	"Danced"	—	7	—	—	—	—	Toyah! Toyah! Toyah!
1981	"It's a Mystery"	4	—	—	—	—	—	Anthem
1981	"I Want to Be Free"	8	1	35	61	10	30	Anthem
1981	"Thunder in the Mountains"	4	1	—	—	10	—	Non-album single
1982	"Brave New World"	21	4	—	—	—	—	The Changeling
1982	"Ieya" (re-recording)	48	5	—	—	—	—	Non-album singles
1982	"Be Proud Be Loud (Be Heard)"	30	3	—	—	29	—	Non-album singles
1983	"Rebel Run"	24	3	—	—	—	—	Love Is the Law
1983	"The Vow"	50	17	—	—	—	—	Love Is the Law
Toyah solo singles
1985	"Don't Fall in Love (I Said)"	22	—	—	—	17	—	Minx
1985	"Soul Passing Through Soul"	57	—	—	—	—	—	Minx
1985	"World in Action"	93	—	—	—	—	—	Minx
1987	"Echo Beach"	54	—	—	—	—	—	Desire
1987	"Moonlight Dancing"	118	—	—	—	—	—	Desire
1993	"Out of the Blue"	130	—	—	—	—	—	Dreamchild
1994	"Now and Then"	108	—	—	—	—	—	Dreamchild
2007	"Latex Messiah (Viva la Rebel in You)"	—	—	—	—	—	—	In the Court of the Crimson Queen
2011	"Fallen" (feat. Yomanda)	—	—	—	—	—	—	Non-album single
2011	"21st Century Supersister"	—	—	—	—	—	—	In the Court of the Crimson Queen (2013 edition)
2012	"I Believe in Father Christmas"	—	—	—	—	—	—	Mayhem
2019	"Sensational"	—	—	—	—	—	—	In the Court of the Crimson Queen (2019 edition)
2019	"Telepathic Lover"	—	—	—	—	—	—	In the Court of the Crimson Queen (2019 edition)
2019	"Dance in the Hurricane"	—	—	—	—	—	—	In the Court of the Crimson Queen (2019 edition)
2019	"Step into the New World"	—	—	—	—	—	—	Non-album single
2021	"Levitate"	—	—	—	—	—	—	Posh Pop
2021	"Zoom Zoom"	—	—	—	—	—	—	Posh Pop
2021	"Summer of Love"	—	—	—	—	—	—	Posh Pop
2022	"Sphinx"	—	—	—	—	—	—	Anthem (2022 expanded edition)
2022	"War Boys"	—	—	—	—	—	—	Anthem (2022 expanded edition)
2022	"Slave to the Rhythm"	—	—	—	—	—	—	In the Court of the Crimson Queen (2023 edition)
2022	"Television"	—	—	—	—	—	—	Anthem (2022 expanded edition)
2022	"Race Through Space"	—	—	—	—	—	—	Live at the Rainbow
2023	"Latex Messiah" (re-recording; feat. Robert Fripp)	—	—	—	—	—	—	In the Court of the Crimson Queen (2023 edition)
2023	"Jungles of Jupiter"	—	—	—	—	—	—	Live at Drury Lane
2023	"We Are"	—	—	—	—	—	—	Live at Drury Lane
2023	"Angel and Me"	—	—	—	—	—	—	The Changeling (2023 expanded edition)
2023	"Dawn Chorus"	—	—	—	—	—	—	The Changeling (2023 expanded edition)
2023	"Street Creature"	—	—	—	—	—	—	The Changeling (2023 expanded edition)
2024	"Roses in Chains"	—	—	—	—	—	—	Non-album single
2024	"Martian Cowboy"	—	—	—	—	—	—	Love Is The Law (2024 Expanded and Remastered Version)
2024	"Haunted" (Home Demo)	—	—	—	—	—	—	Love Is The Law (2024 Expanded and Remastered Version)
2024	"The Vow" (Alternate Mix)	—	—	—	—	—	—	Love Is The Law (2024 Expanded and Remastered Version)
2025	"Echo Beach" (Acoustic)	—	—	—	—	—	—	Desire (Super Deluxe Edition)
"—" denotes releases that did not chart or were not released

== Videos ==
=== Video albums ===
Year	Title	Details
1981	At the Rainbow	Released: 1981; Label: BBC Video; Medium: VHS, LaserDisc; Live material filmed at the Rainbow Theatre, London
1982	Good Morning Universe	Released: 1982; Label: BBC Video; Medium: VHS; Live material filmed at the Theatre Royal, Drury Lane on Christmas Eve 1981
1984	Toyah! Toyah! Toyah!	Released: 1984; Label: K-tel; Medium: VHS; Accompaniment to the compilation album
1986	Toyah	Released: 2 February 1986; Label: Renegade Video; Medium: VHS; Compilation of promo videos and performances
Toyah solo video albums
2005	Wild Essence: Live in the 21st Century	Released: 28 November 2005; Label: Cherry Red Films; Medium: DVD; Live material filmed at the Robin 2 Club, Wolverhampton in September 2005

=== Music videos ===
Year	Title
1979	"Neon Womb"
1980	"Ieya"
1980	"Blue Meanings"
1981	"I Want to Be Free"
1981	"Thunder in the Mountains"
1982	"Brave New World"
1982	"Dawn Chorus"
1983	"Rebel Run"
Toyah solo music videos
1985	"Don't Fall in Love (I Said)"
1985	"Soul Passing Through Soul"
1985	"America for Beginners"
1987	"Echo Beach"
1993	"Out of the Blue"
1994	"Now and Then"
2007	"Latex Messiah (Viva la Rebel in You)" (Version 1)
2007	"Latex Messiah (Viva la Rebel in You)" (Version 2)
2007	"Heal Ourselves"
2007	"Lesser God"
2008	"Sensational" (Version 1)
2011	"Fallen"
2019	"Sensational" (Version 2)
2019	"Step into the New World"
2021	"Levitate"
2021	"Zoom Zoom"
2021	"Summer of Love"
2021	"Space Dance"
2021	"The Bride Will Return"
2021	"Barefoot on Mars"
2021	"Rhythm in My House"
2021	"Monkeys"
2021	"Kill the Rage"
2021	"Take Me Home"
2022	"Slave to the Rhythm"
2024	"Roses in Chains"
