= Toyah Solo =

Box set by Toyah
- Released: 28 February 2020
- Genre: Art rock
- Label: Edsel
- Producer: various

Toyah chronology
| In the Court of the Crimson Queen (2008) | Toyah Solo (2020) | Posh Pop (2021) |

Toyah Solo is a compilation box set by British singer Toyah Willcox, consisting of seven CDs and a DVD, released on Edsel Records in 2020.

== Background ==
The box contains most of Toyah's solo work from 1985 to 2003, featuring the six albums Minx (1985), Desire (1987), Prostitute (1988), Ophelia's Shadow (1991), Take the Leap! (1993) and Velvet Lined Shell (2003) alongside a CD of remixed, revisited and rare tracks and a DVD with promotional music videos and an interview. Rare, Remixed & Revisited was also released as a separate digital album. The set excludes the album Dreamchild and Toyah's two albums of re-recorded material, Looking Back and The Acoustic Album.

The box set entered the UK Independent Albums Chart Top 50 at number 10, the UK Albums Sales Chart Top 100 at number 34, and the Physical Albums Chart Top 100 at number 30.

== Track listing ==
=== CD 1: Minx ===
1. "Soldier of Fortune, Terrorist of Love"
2. "Don't Fall in Love (I Said)"
3. "Soul Passing Through Soul"
4. "Sympathy"
5. "I'll Serve You Well"
6. "Over 21"
7. "All in a Rage"
8. "Space Between the Sounds"
9. "Schools's Out"
10. "World in Action"
11. "America for Beginners"
12. "Vigilante"

Bonus tracks

1. "Snow Covers the Kiss"
2. "Kiss the Devil"
3. "Don't Fall in Love (I Said)" (Extended Mix)
4. "Soul Passing Through Soul" (Extended Mix)
5. "World in Action" (Extended Mix)
6. "World in Action" (Action Mix)

=== CD 2: Desire ===
1. "Echo Beach"
2. "Moonlight Dancing"
3. "Revive the World"
4. "The View"
5. "Moon Migration"
6. "Love's Unkind"
7. "Dear Diary"
8. "Deadly as a Woman"
9. "Goodbye Baby"
10. "When a Woman Cries"
11. "Desire"

Bonus tracks

1. "Echo Beach" (Surf Mix)
2. "Plenty"
3. "Sun Up"
4. "Re-Entry into Dance"
5. "Mesmerised"
6. "Lion of Symmetry" (Toyah and Tony Banks)

=== CD 3: Prostitute ===
1. "Hello" – 1:20
2. "Prostitute" – 2:58
3. "Wife" – 3:46
4. "The Show" – 2:45
5. "Dream House" – 4:29
6. "Homecraft" – 2:02
7. "Obsession" – 3:44
8. "Let the Power Bleed" – 4:43
9. "Restless" – 4:05
10. "Falling to Earth" – 3:26
11. "Jazz Singers in the Trees" – 4:52
12. "Vale of Evesham" – 2:50
13. "Ghosts of the Universe" – 3:55

=== CD 4: Ophelia's Shadow ===
1. "Ophelia's Shadow" – 5:54
2. "The Shaman Says" – 5:23
3. "Brilliant Day" – 2:39
4. "Prospect" – 3:13
5. "Turning Tide" – 5:40
6. "Take What You Will" – 5:42
7. "Ghost Light" – 4:28
8. "The Woman Who Had an Affair with Herself" – 4:17
9. "Homeward" – 5:16
10. "Lords of the Never Known" – 4:32

Bonus tracks

1. "Harlequin (Holy Day)" – 5:37
2. "Broken Special (The Island)" – 6:50
3. "Face the Space" (Vocal Version) – 6:00
4. "Symbiotic" – 3:50

=== CD 5: Take the Leap! ===
1. "Now I'm Running"
2. "Lust for Love"
3. "Invisible Love"
4. "Name of Love"
5. "Winter in Wonderland"
6. "God Ceases to Dream"
7. "Ieya"
8. "Waiting"
9. "Neon Womb"
10. "Elusive Stranger"
11. "Our Movie"
12. "Thunder in the Mountains"
13. "I Wanna Be Free"
14. "It's a Mystery"

Bonus tracks

1. "Requite Me" (Demo)
2. "Invisible Love" (Demo)
3. "Waiting" (Alternate Mix)
4. "It's a Mystery" (Weybridge Mix)

=== CD 6: Rare, Remixed & Revisited ===
1. "Tears for Ellie" (Demo)
2. "God Ceases to Dream" (Remix)
3. "Poland (One Day on Earth)" (Demo)
4. "Now I'm Running" (Remix)
5. "It's a Mystery" (Whispered Elixir Mix)
6. "Lust for Love" (Demo)
7. "Angel" (Demo)
8. "Rebel Run" (Revisited)
9. "Good Morning Universe" (Revisited)
10. "Be Proud, Be Loud (Be Heard)" (Revisited)
11. "Desire" (Revisited)
12. "Obsolete" (Revisited)
13. "Danced" (Revisited)
14. "We Are" (Revisited)
15. "Angel & Me" (Revisited)
16. "Believe in Me" (Demo)

=== CD 7: Velvet Lined Shell ===
1. "Every Scar Has a Silver Lining"
2. "Velvet Lined Shell"
3. "Little Tears of Love"
4. "You're a Miracle"
5. "Mother"
6. "Troublesome Thing"

Bonus tracks

1. "Experience"
2. "Killing Made Easy" (Family of Noise)
3. "In Estonia" (This Fragile Moment)
4. "Fallen" (Yomanda & Toyah)
5. "Drinking from the Gun" (Dodson & Fogg)
6. "Nine Hours" (Toyah + Peter)
7. "America for Beginners" (Nocturne Blue Redux)
8. "Step into the New World" (from Invasion Planet Earth)

=== DVD: Promo Videos ===
1. "Don't Fall in Love (I Said)"
2. "Soul Passing Through Soul"
3. "Echo Beach"
4. "Fallen" (Yomanda & Toyah)
5. "Sensational"
6. "Interview: Toyah Talks About Her Solo Albums"

== Charts ==
| Chart (2020) | Peak position |
|---|---|
| Scottish Albums | 62 |
| UK Album Sales (OCC) | 34 |
| UK Independent Albums (OCC) | 10 |
