= Wild Essence: Live in the 21st Century =

Video by Toyah Willcox
- Released: 28 November 2005
- Recorded: 16 September 2005
- Venue: The Robin 2, Wolverhampton
- Genre: Pop-punk; new wave
- Length: 150 min.
- Label: Cherry Red Films
- Producer: Toyah Willcox; John Bentham

Wild Essence: Live in the 21st Century is a live DVD by the British singer Toyah Willcox, released in 2005 by Cherry Red Films. It was filmed at a concert at the Robin 2 club in Wolverhampton on 16 September 2005. The setlist consists of songs from the Toyah band and Willcox's solo repertoire as well as several cover versions. Special features include four classic music videos for "I Want to Be Free", "Thunder in the Mountains", "Brave New World" and "Rebel Run", a backstage interview, Toyah discography and gallery. Cover photography was taken by Dean Stockings. The full concert was officially released onto YouTube between 2017 and 2018.

== Track listing ==
1. "Echo Beach" (Martha and the Muffins cover)
2. "Obsolete"
3. "Race Through Space"
4. "Neon Womb"
5. "Little Tears of Love"
6. "Thunder in the Mountains"
7. "Jungles of Jupiter"
8. "Our Movie"
9. "It's a Mystery"
10. "Danced"
11. "I Explode"
12. "Sweet Child of Mine" (Guns N' Roses cover)
13. "She Sells Sanctuary" (The Cult cover)
14. "Ieya"
15. "Till Victory" (Patti Smith cover)
16. "I Want to Be Free"

== Personnel ==
- Toyah Willcox – vocals
- Chris Wong – guitar, musical director
- Andy Double – keyboards
- Tim Rose – bass
- Barry Brewer – drums
- Russell Bennett – trumpet
- Kenji Fenton – saxophone
- James Garlic – trombone

Production

- Paul Nicholson – live sound engineer
- Craig Astley – project assistance
