= Zero Hero =

Zero Hero may refer to:

- Zero Hero, a music collaboration group consisting of Darren Styles and Stonebank
- Zero Hero, a television show on Singaporean network Okto
- Zero Hero, a Singaporean variety show starring Marcus Chin
- "Zero Hero", a 1978 song by Roogalator
- The Zero Hero, a 1983 episode of the animated version of The Little Rascals
- "Zero Hero", a 1962 short segment from Episode 2 of The Hanna-Barbera New Cartoon Series
- The Tale of the Zero Hero, a book in the Are You Afraid of the Dark? series by John Peel
- "Zero Hero", the first episode of Hairy Jeremy
- "Zero Hero", a poem by Barry McSweeney
- Zero Hero, a Disney comic by Carl Barks
