= Fallen (Yomanda and Toyah song) =

Single by Yomanda and Toyah
- Released: 18 September 2011
- Recorded: 2011
- Genre: Dance
- Length: 4:04
- Songwriters: Paul Masterson; Toyah Willcox
- Producer: Paul Masterson

Toyah singles chronology
"Latex Messiah (Viva la Rebel in You)" (2007)	"Fallen" (2011)	"21st Century Supersister" (2011)

Music video
- "Fallen" on YouTube

"Fallen" is a song by the British DJ Paul Masterson, also known as Yomanda, and the British rock singer Toyah Willcox, released independently in 2011.

== Background ==
The track started life as an instrumental piece by Masterson, who sent it to Toyah and asked if she would record a vocal for it. In an interview on Gaydar Radio, he said that they "hadn't actually met until the day of recording the vocals. We spoke on email and we recorded the vocals down at Dave Pemberton's studio in Essex. (...) It took about three hours and all done, pretty much, in one take." "Fallen" was released as a standalone digital single in September 2011. In 2020, it appeared as a bonus track on Toyah's retrospective box set Toyah Solo.

== Music video ==
The song's music video was directed and edited by Simon Booth and Dean Stockings.

== Track listing ==
- Digital single

No.	Title	Length
1.	"Fallen" (Radio Edit)	4:04
2.	"Fallen" (Extended)	5:24

== Personnel ==
- Toyah Willcox – vocals
- Paul "Yomanda" Masterson – all instruments, producing, mixing
