= 21st Century Supersister =

Single by Toyah

from the album In the Court of the Crimson Queen
- Released: 6 November 2011
- Recorded: 2007; 2011
- Genre: Rock
- Length: 3:40
- Label: Willow Recordings
- Songwriter(s): Toyah Willcox; Simon Darlow
- Producer(s): Simon Darlow

Toyah singles chronology
"Fallen" (2011)	"21st Century Supersister" (2011)	"I Believe in Father Christmas" (2012)

"21st Century Supersister" is a song by the British rock singer Toyah Willcox, released in 2011.

== Background ==
The song was originally written by Toyah and her collaborator Simon Darlow for the 2008 album In the Court of the Crimson Queen, but did not make the final tracklist. It was subsequently re-worked with new lyrics and featured in the 2011 film The Power of Three, in which Willcox starred. The original version was included as the B-side of the digital single and was added to the album for its 2013 reissue.

"21st Century Supersister" and its parent album In the Court of the Crimson Queen are both references to King Crimson, the band formed by Willcox's husband Robert Fripp. King Crimson's most well-known track "21st Century Schizoid Man" appeared on the band's debut album, In the Court of the Crimson King.

== Track listing ==
- Digital single
1. "21st Century Supersister" – 3:40
2. "21st Century Supersister" (Original Demo) – 3:36

== Personnel ==
- Toyah Willcox – vocals
- Simon Darlow – all instruments, backing vocals, producing, mixing
