= Diary of a Facelift =

- Author: Toyah Willcox
- Language: English
- Genre: autobiography
- Publisher: Michael O'Mara Books
- Publication date: 17 March 2005
- Publication place: United Kingdom
- Pages: 240
- ISBN: 184317135X
- Preceded by: Living Out Loud

Diary of a Facelift is the second book by Toyah Willcox, published in 2005 by Michael O'Mara Books. It is an autobiographical account of her experiences with cosmetic surgery.

== Background ==
Willcox had been contemplating cosmetic surgery ever since she was twenty-six. Her decision was eventually prompted in 2003, at the age of forty-five, when she took part in the second series of I'm a Celebrity...Get Me Out of Here!, after which she received unfavourable media coverage referring to her appearance, particularly a derogatory comment by Jonathan Ross on his BBC Radio 2 show. For three years prior to her facelift, Willcox had been having regular botox injections under her eyes.

The singer underwent the surgery in Paris in February 2004. It involved lifting her jawline and operating skin around her eyes, and has reportedly cost £7,500. Graphic descriptions of the procedure as well as photos of the singer's recovery were included in the book. The cover photos of Toyah were taken by Dean Stockings. Excerpts from the book were published in The Daily Telegraph in the lead-up to its official release. The book gained a large amount of media interest.

== Reception ==
Diary of a Facelift has generated mixed response in the media. It was described in Glasgow Evening Times as "a truly remarkable account". A negative opinion in The Guardian found it "galling for such an admirable woman to be setting such a bad example to the sisterhood". Despite the controversy, the book reached the top 10 in many booksellers' lists, including Waterstones.
