= In the Court of the Crimson Queen =

Studio album by Toyah
- Released: 15 September 2008
- Genre: Art rock
- Length: 37:56 (original release)
- Label: Willow Recordings
- Producer: Simon Darlow

Toyah chronology
Velvet Lined Shell (2003)	In the Court of the Crimson Queen (2008)	Toyah Solo (2020)

2019 reissue cover

Professional ratings
Review scores
Source	Rating
Edinburgh Evening News	Positive

In the Court of the Crimson Queen is a studio album by British singer Toyah Willcox, originally released in 2008 by Willow Recordings.

== Background ==
The album title (a reference to King Crimson's debut album, In the Court of the Crimson King) was suggested by producer/co-author Simon Darlow and was endorsed by King Crimson mainstay and Toyah's husband Robert Fripp. It was Toyah's first full-length album of new material since 1994's Dreamchild. Originally released in September 2008, it did not chart, but was reviewed as the "CD of the Year" in the American Good Times magazine. The album was then re-issued in 2013 with an additional track.

In April 2019, In the Court of the Crimson Queen was reissued by Edsel Records. It featured five additional tracks, including "Dance in the Hurricane" (with spoken word intro from Robert Fripp). Many of the tracks had been slightly remixed and included live drums and extra backing vocals. An abridged LP edition was also released for Record Store Day. This time, the album charted at #74 in the official UK Albums Chart (her first entry since 1985's Minx) as well as peaking at #22 in the UK sales chart and #7 in the independent albums chart.

The album was re-released yet again in February 2023, featuring the 2022 single "Slave to the Rhythm" and re-recordings of selected songs with Robert Fripp on guitar. It was branded as the "definitive version of the album".

== Singles and promotion ==
The lead single "Latex Messiah (Viva la Rebel in You)" was released digitally in 2007 and was accompanied by a number of music videos. Further videos for the tracks "Heal Ourselves", "Lesser God" and "Sensational" were made available on Toyah's YouTube channel. "Lesser God" was performed on a national UK tour of Steve Steinman's Vampires Rock, in which Toyah was a guest star during 2008 and 2009.

A track originally recorded for the album, but not included in the initial release, entitled "21st Century Supersister", was subsequently re-worked with new lyrics to be featured in the 2011 film The Power of Three in which Toyah starred. The track was also released as a digital single along with the original demo as its B-side. The re-worked version was included in the 2013 CD reissue of the album. From December 2012, "Sensational" was used in a national UK TV advertising campaign for slimming brand Weight Watchers.

The album's 2019 edition was preceded by a new video for "Sensational" and a promotional download of "Telepathic Lover". In July 2019, "Dance in the Hurricane" was released as a digital single. The accompanying UK tour took place in autumn 2019.

== Track listing ==
=== Original release ===
All tracks are written by Toyah Willcox and Simon Darlow.

No.	Title	Length
1.	"Sensational"	3:48
2.	"Latex Messiah (Viva la Rebel in You)"	3:51
3.	"Heal Ourselves"	3:56
4.	"Lesser God"	3:51
5.	"Angel in You"	3:42
6.	"Love Crazy"	3:35
7.	"Bad Man"	3:59
8.	"Hyperventilate"	3:24
9.	"Come"	3:38
10.	"Legacy"	4:12

2013 edition bonus track
No.	Title	Length
11.	"21st Century Supersister"	3:40

=== 2019 re-release ===
Disc one
No.	Title	Length
1.	"Dance in the Hurricane"	5:28
2.	"Sensational"	3:48
3.	"Latex Messiah (Viva la Rebel in You)"	3:49
4.	"Telepathic Lover"	3:47
5.	"Heal Ourselves"	3:59
6.	"Lesser God"	3:52
7.	"Love Crazy"	3:35
8.	"Legacy"	4:11

Disc two
No.	Title	Length
1.	"21st Century Supersister"	3:39
2.	"Bad Man"	4:03
3.	"Angel in You"	3:40
4.	"Hyperventilate"	3:25
5.	"Come"	3:39
6.	"Who Let the Beast Out"	3:48
7.	"Our Hearts Still Beat"	3:21

=== 2019 LP edition ===
Side one
No.	Title	Length
1.	"Dance in the Hurricane"	5:28
2.	"Sensational"	3:48
3.	"Latex Messiah (Viva la Rebel in You)"	3:51
4.	"Heal Ourselves"	3:56
5.	"Lesser God"	3:51

Side two
No.	Title	Length
1.	"Angel in You"	3:42
2.	"Love Crazy"	3:35
3.	"Bad Man"	3:59
4.	"Hyperventilate"	3:24
5.	"Come"	3:38
6.	"Legacy"	4:12

=== 2023 Rhythm Deluxe Edition ===
No.	Title	Length
1.	"Dance in the Hurricane"	5:27
2.	"Slave to the Rhythm" (featuring Robert Fripp)	4:12
3.	"Sensational" (Posh Redux) (featuring Robert Fripp)	3:44
4.	"Heal Ourselves" (Posh Redux) (featuring Robert Fripp)	4:02
5.	"Latex Messiah (Viva la Rebel in You)" (Posh Redux) (featuring Robert Fripp)	4:29
6.	"Bad Man"	4:03
7.	"Telepathic Lover"	3:48
8.	"Angel in You"	3:40
9.	"21st Century Supersister"	3:38
10.	"Lesser God"	3:52
11.	"Love Crazy"	3:35
12.	"Legacy"	4:12
13.	"Who Let the Beast Out"	3:48
14.	"Hyperventilate"	3:25
15.	"Come"	3:38
16.	"Our Hearts Still Beat"	3:20

== Personnel ==
- Toyah Willcox – vocals, arrangements
- Simon Darlow – all instruments, backing vocals, arrangements, production, mixing
- Alfie Darlow – drums on tracks 1, 3 and 4, violin on track 3
- Ben Darlow – mastering
- Alan Sawyers – artwork
- Dean Stockings – photography

== Charts ==
Chart (2019)	Peak position
Scottish Albums	26
UK Albums (Official Charts Company)	74
UK Independent Albums	7
UK Rock & Metal Albums	3

Chart (2023)	Peak position
Scottish Albums	47
UK Albums Sales (Official Charts Company)	37
UK Independent Albums	17
UK Rock & Metal Albums	8
