= Kneeling at the Shrine =

Studio album by Sunday All Over the World
- Released: April 1991
- Genre: Art rock; progressive rock
- Length: 38:21
- Label: E.G.
- Producer: Sunday All Over the World

Professional ratings
Review scores
Source	Rating
AllMusic	4.5/5 stars

Kneeling at the Shrine is a 1991 studio album by the English rock band Sunday All Over the World, consisting of singer Toyah Willcox, her husband, guitarist Robert Fripp, Chapman Stick player Trey Gunn, and drummer Paul Beavis.

== Background ==
The band formed in 1988 and played a short tour under the name Fripp Fripp, during which Toyah performed material from her then-most recent album Prostitute as a support act. Then, having changed their name to Sunday All Over the World, they played more dates in 1989. Kneeling at the Shrine was the band's first and only studio album, released by E.G. Records in 1991, after which they disbanded. The album does not include all songs that the band was performing at the concerts. Two of those songs, "Brilliant Day" and "Lords of the Never Known", were released around the same time on Toyah's solo album Ophelia's Shadow. Although Willcox and Fripp are a married couple since 1986, this band was one of the few instances in which the two musicians worked together professionally.

== Track listing ==
All songs written by Sunday All Over the World, except "Freedom" written by Robert Fripp and Toyah Willcox.

No.	Title	Length
1.	"Sunday All Over the World"	4:06
2.	"Blood Bruise Tattoo"	2:54
3.	"Kneeling at the Shrine"	5:00
4.	"Don't Take It Away"	2:30
5.	"Transient Joy"	4:18
6.	"Open Air"	3:36
7.	"Strange Girls"	3:12
8.	"If I Were a Man"	3:11
9.	"Answered with a Smile"	3:08
10.	"Storm Angel"	3:29
11.	"Freedom"	7:57

== Personnel ==
Credits adapted from liner notes.

- Toyah Willcox – vocals, mixing
- Robert Fripp – guitar, mixing, mastering
- Trey Gunn – stick, vocals, overdubs, mixing
- Paul Beavis – drums, percussion
- David Singleton – mixing, mastering, overdubs
- Tony Arnold – mastering
- Tony Cousins – mastering
- Douglas Brothers – photography
- Bill Smith – cover design
