= Latex Messiah (Viva la Rebel in You) =

Single by Toyah

from the album In the Court of the Crimson Queen
- Released: 29 October 2007
- Recorded: 2007
- Genre: Rock
- Length: 3:53
- Label: Willow Recordings
- Songwriter(s): Toyah Willcox; Simon Darlow
- Producer(s): Simon Darlow

Toyah singles chronology
"Now and Then" (1994)	"Latex Messiah (Viva la Rebel in You)" (2007)	"Fallen" (2011)

"Latex Messiah (Viva la Rebel in You)" is a song by the British rock singer Toyah Willcox, released in 2007.

== Background ==
The song was written by Toyah and her collaborator Simon Darlow, and was produced by Darlow. It was her first single release since 1994 and also her first digital release. The track served as the lead single from Toyah's new studio album In the Court of the Crimson Queen which was released almost a year later. The song reached various download charts in iTunes Store, but did not enter the general singles chart in the UK.

A new version of "Latex Messiah" was released on the 2023 re-recording of In the Court of the Crimson Queen, featuring Robert Fripp.

== Music videos ==
Several "guerilla footage" homemade videos were shot for the song in collaboration with photographer Dean Stockings. They were uploaded on Toyah's Myspace page and her official YouTube channel.

== Track listing ==
- Digital single
1. "Latex Messiah (Viva la Rebel in You)" – 3:53
- Digital single (2023)
1. "Latex Messiah" (Posh Redux) (feat. Robert Fripp) – 4:29
2. "Sensational" (Posh Redux) (feat. Robert Fripp) – 3:44
3. "Slave to the Rhythm" (feat. Robert Fripp) – 4:12

== Personnel ==
- Toyah Willcox – vocals
- Simon Darlow – all instruments, backing vocals, producing, mixing
