= Prostitute (Toyah Willcox album) =

Studio album by Toyah
- Released: October 1988
- Recorded: 1988
- Genre: Industrial music; avant-pop
- Length: 44:55
- Label: E.G.
- Producer: Tony Arnold; Toyah Willcox

Toyah chronology
Desire (1987)	Prostitute (1988)	Ophelia's Shadow (1991)

Reissue cover

Professional ratings
Review scores
Source	Rating
AllMusic	3.5/5 stars
Q	3/5 stars

Prostitute is the third solo album by British singer Toyah Willcox, released in 1988 by E.G. Records.

== Background ==
It is a concept album, highly experimental in nature, marking a considerable divergence from Toyah's previous works. It was inspired particularly by the scrutiny her recent marriage to Robert Fripp was under in the press, which made her feel that she "had gone from all-powerful artist to invisible woman". The material was written and recorded only by Toyah and Steve Sidelnyc in a space of a few weeks. It is presented as a continuous piece of music, although a time-code programme has been provided to enable the listener to access a particular title. To accommodate the two-sided format of the LP and cassette releases, side one – subtitled Lie Down – contains the first seven titles, and side two – subtitled Think of England – contains the rest of the album. The cover photo comes from Stuart Brisley's performance The Game (1969). The album reportedly cost £10,000 to make.

No singles were drawn from the album. Toyah performed the album live on the 1988 tour with the band Fripp Fripp (which would later change their name to Sunday All Over the World). In 1991, Prostitute was nominated to a NAIRD Indie Award in the Women's Music category.

In May 2003, the album was reissued on Toyah's own record label, Vertical Species, together with its follow-up, Ophelia's Shadow. This edition came with a new cover art and extensive liner notes. In 2020, it was re-released with the original cover as part of the Toyah Solo box set, and subsequently also on yellow vinyl.

== Track listing ==
Side one – Lie Down

1. "Hello" (Toyah Willcox) – 1:20
2. "Prostitute" (Willcox, Steve Sidelnyc) – 2:58
3. "Wife" (Willcox) – 3:46
4. "The Show" (Willcox) – 2:45
5. "Dream House" (Willcox, Sidelnyc) – 4:29
6. "Homecraft" (Willcox) – 2:02
7. "Obsession" (Willcox) – 3:44

Side two – Think of England

8. "Let the Power Bleed" (Willcox, Sidelnyc) – 4:43
9. "Restless" (Willcox, Sidelnyc) – 4:05
10. "Falling to Earth" (Willcox) – 3:26
11. "Jazz Singers in the Trees" (Willcox, Sidelnyc) – 4:52
12. "Vale of Evesham" (Willcox) – 2:50
13. "Ghosts in the Universe" (Willcox, Sidelnyc) – 3:55

== Personnel ==
- Toyah Willcox – vocals, keyboards, guitar, Akai (sampler), producer
- Steve Sidelnyc – drums, percussion, keyboards, Akai (sampler)
- Robert Fripp – additional vocals on "Hello"
- Tony Arnold – producer
