= Posh Pop =

Studio album by Toyah
- Released: 27 August 2021
- Recorded: 2020–2021
- Genre: Pop rock
- Length: 41:44
- Label: Demon
- Producer: Simon Darlow

Toyah chronology
Toyah Solo (2020)	Posh Pop (2021)

Singles from Posh Pop
- 1. "Levitate" Released: 26 June 2021; 2. "Zoom Zoom" Released: 16 July 2021; 3. "Summer of Love" Released: 6 August 2021

Professional ratings
Review scores
Source	Rating
The Arts Desk	2/5 stars
Classic Pop	4/5 stars
Retro Pop	4/5 stars

Posh Pop is a 2021 studio album by British singer Toyah Willcox, released by Demon Records.

== Background ==
The album was written by Toyah and her longtime collaborator Simon Darlow who also produced the material. Willcox's husband Robert Fripp performs guitar under the alias Bobby Willcox. The album was recorded during the COVID-19 pandemic and its working title was Outside of Culture. Every song on the album was accompanied by a music video filmed by Toyah herself during the 2021 spring lockdown, filmed largely in her Pershore house as well as the nearby Pershore Abbey.

== Lyrical content ==
The opening track, "Levitate", originally called "Gravity", is "about potential, the future, letting go of the past and moving on, (...) about the unification of all of us". "Zoom Zoom" took its origin in co-writer Simon Darlow's extensive use of the teleconferencing software Zoom and Toyah's claim that "we're all being watched and that every one of our ideas has purpose and is now being hunted by market people who want to market things back to us".

The inspiration behind "The Bride Will Return" was Israa al Seblani, a bride caught mid-wedding during the 2020 Beirut explosion, who went viral following the incident. Willcox said that the "song is very much to celebrate the beauty of the brides around the world, who've not been able to have their weddings during lockdown".

"Space Dance" was inspired by Darlow's dream to be an astronaut and was originally called "Space Man".

Willcox has described "Barefoot on Mars" as "a song about invisible love and addressing something from our past that needs communicating and contact with" and explained that it refers to the complicated relationship with her mother and her death.

"Summer of Love" is an anti-war protest song referring to the original 1967 Summer of Love. Willcox said that in the song she "wanted to question reality [and] everything we have within the modern world, (...) that we're all being told and sold a dream. (...) Within Hinduism everything is believed to be the big dream, that this is where we come to change ourselves, it's not actual reality. (...) By joining together and being united perhaps we can bring a positive change and build that new world and that better future".

Talking about "Monkeys", Toyah explained that it is about "us needing leadership [and] having to vote for leaders who then go off the rails, [about] quite old world leaders who are despots, who are not using democracy and at the same time are causing world poverty".

"Take Me Home" was described by Toyah as a sequel to "Danced". The song tells about dangers to Earth ecology and possible space colonization, but also about the power of love and unity of people.

== Release and promotion ==
Posh Pop was originally slated for a late July 2021 release, but was then pushed back by a month. It was preceded by the release of three singles: "Levitate", "Zoom Zoom", and "Summer of Love". The album debuted and peaked at no. 22 on the UK Albums Chart becoming Toyah's highest-charting album since 1982. It also reached no. 6 on the UK Albums Sales Chart and no.1 on the Independent Albums Chart. Willcox promoted the album with the Posh Pop Tour, running from September 2021 to March 2022.

== Track listing ==
All tracks are written by Toyah Willcox and Simon Darlow.

1. "Levitate" – 3:59
2. "Zoom Zoom" – 3:55
3. "The Bride Will Return" – 4:16
4. "Space Dance" – 4:00
5. "Barefoot on Mars" – 3:59
6. "Rhythm in My House" – 3:53
7. "Summer of Love" – 4:17
8. "Monkeys" – 4:22
9. "Kill the Rage" – 4:15
10. "Take Me Home" – 4:47

== Personnel ==
- Toyah Willcox – lead and backing vocals
- Bobby Willcox – guitar
- Simon Darlow – guitar, bass, cello, keyboards, backing vocals
- Jeremy Stacey – drums
- Alfie Darlow – drums
- Anne Cruikshank – backing vocals

Production

- Simon Darlow – producer
- Paul Stacey – mixing
- Phil Kinrade – mastering
- Alan Sawyers, Craig Astley – artwork

== Charts ==
Chart (2021)	Peak position
Scottish Albums (OCC)	8
UK Albums (OCC)	22
UK Vinyl Albums	9
UK Independent Albums	1
