= Velvet Lined Shell =

Studio album by Toyah
- Released: May 2003
- Recorded: 2002–2003
- Studio: Artisan Audio, Birmingham, UK
- Genre: Art rock
- Length: 22:43
- Label: Vertical Species
- Producer: Tim Elsenburg; Toyah Willcox; Jon Cotton

Toyah chronology
The Acoustic Album (1996)	Velvet Lined Shell (2003)	In the Court of the Crimson Queen (2008)

Professional ratings
Review scores
Source	Rating
ManchesterOnline	2/5 stars
Q	3/5 stars

Velvet Lined Shell is a mini-album by the British singer Toyah Willcox, released in 2003 by her independent label Vertical Species.

== Background ==
This release consists of six tracks, recorded in Toyah's hometown of Birmingham. Three of the musicians on this album, Anthony Bishop, Tim Elsenburg and Alistair Hamer, are members of the experimental rock band Sweet Billy Pilgrim. The material has a deliberately raw feel to it, and what Willcox described as a "darker direction". The singer named the likes of Nick Cave, Garbage, Mogwai and Marilyn Manson amongst her newer influences. Three tracks on this album had first appeared on the 2002 EP Little Tears of Love, which was sold exclusively via Willcox's website, and strictly limited to 1000 signed copies. One track from that EP, the Tim Elsenburg composition "Experience", does not feature on this album.

Velvet Lined Shell was included in the Toyah Solo CD box set in February 2020. The following month, it was reissued on purple 10" vinyl.

== Track listing ==
All tracks written by Toyah Willcox and Tim Elsenburg.

1. "Every Scar Has a Silver Lining" – 3:25
2. "Velvet Lined Shell" – 4:14
3. "Little Tears of Love" – 3:23
4. "You're a Miracle" – 3:00
5. "Mother" – 4:20
6. "Troublesome Thing" – 4:21

== Personnel ==
- Toyah Willcox – vocals, producer
- Tim Elsenburg – guitars and backing vocals, producer, mixing
- Jon Cotton – keyboards, producer, mixing
- Anthony Bishop – bass guitar and backing vocals
- Alistair Hamer – drums
- David Singleton – mastering
