= Looking Back (Toyah Willcox album) =

Studio album by Toyah
- Released: 1995
- Genre: New wave; pop rock
- Length: 46:05
- Label: QED
- Producer: Oliver Davis; David Richardson

Toyah chronology
Dreamchild (1994)	Looking Back (1995)	The Acoustic Album (1996)

Looking Back is a studio album by the British singer Toyah Willcox, released in 1995. It is a collection of re-recordings of songs from her back catalogue, mostly classic hits from the Toyah band repertoire. The material was originally conceived as part of a double album Toyah Classics slated for release in March 1995. The two sets would eventually be released individually, with Looking Back as an 'electric' accompaniment to The Acoustic Album, released the following year. The album has never been re-released digitally.

== Track listing ==
1. "I Wanna Be Free" (Toyah Willcox, Joel Bogen) – 2:53
2. "Obsolete" (Willcox, Bogen, Nigel Glockler) – 2:56
3. "It's a Mystery" (Keith Hale) – 3:58
4. "We Are" (Willcox, Bogen) – 3:03
5. "Thunder in the Mountains" (Willcox, Adrian Lee, Nigel Glockler) – 4:16
6. "Good Morning Universe" (Willcox, Bogen) – 3:46
7. "Angel & Me" (Willcox, Bogen) – 3:22
8. "Be Proud, Be Loud (Be Heard)" (Willcox, Bogen) – 3:22
9. "Danced" (Willcox, Bogen, Peter Bush) – 5:09
10. "Rebel Run" (Willcox, Simon Darlow) – 3:14
11. "Desire" (Willcox, Robert Fripp) – 2:34
12. "Ieya" (Willcox, Bogen, Bush) – 6:11

== Personnel ==
- Toyah Willcox – vocals
- Tony 'Pooh' Kelly – guitars
- David Waddington – guitar
- Andy Nye – keyboards
- Bob Skeat – bass, acoustic bass
- Andy Dewar – drums, percussion
- Tacye Lynette – additional vocals

Production

- Oliver Davis – producer
- Paul Maddens – engineer
- David Richardson – executive producer
