= The Changeling (album) =

Studio album by Toyah
- Released: June 1982
- Recorded: 1982
- Studio: Roundhouse (London)
- Genre: New wave
- Length: 41:12 (original release); 63:11 (first CD re-release)
- Label: Safari
- Producer: Steve Lillywhite

Toyah chronology
Anthem (1981)	The Changeling (1982)	Warrior Rock: Toyah on Tour (1982)

Singles from The Changeling
- 1. "Brave New World" Released: May 1982

Professional ratings
Review scores
Source	Rating
New Musical Express	Mixed
Record Mirror	2/5 stars

The Changeling is a studio album by the English new wave band Toyah, fronted by Toyah Willcox, released in 1982 by Safari Records. The album peaked at number 6 in the UK where it was certified silver for sales exceeding 60,000 copies. It included the Top 40 single "Brave New World".

== Background ==
The album continued the new wave sound of the band's previous release, Anthem, taking it into a darker, almost gothic direction. Willcox wrote the song lyrics in isolation and the material was recorded at the Roundhouse Recording Studios in the Chalk Farm area of north London in early 1982. The album was produced by Steve Lillywhite using early digital studio recording equipment. Some overseas editions, such as the Dutch release, featured an additional 'Digital Recording' logo on the cover sleeve. Original vinyl issues of the album came complete with a lyric insert, the background of which featured drawings of circuit boards. Around the lyrics of each song were sections of poetry written by Toyah Willcox, which were not included on the album. The front cover features a photo by Bob Carlos Clarke.

Toyah Willcox reflected that The Changeling "wasn't easy to make, in fact it was the unhappiest of all the album experiences, but that doesn't mean it isn't a good album. Not everything has to come effortlessly for it to be right". "I was quite depressed at the time. (...) I was so angry and so anxious to get away from everything that The Changeling came out as quite a dark piece. (...) I was coming into the studio in very dark moods and incredibly emotional and I cried my way through that album, but in retrospect I think that it's quite a remarkable record". Similarly, Phil Spalding described it as "an album recorded with great challenges, difficulties and tensions, but a great album nonetheless and overall, my favourite Toyah band album".

The Changeling placed at number 15 in the Smash Hits readers' poll of the best albums of 1982.

== Lyrical content ==
"Street Creature" was written during Toyah's journey from London to Birmingham. The singer explained that it is "a song about being on a street and being real. (...) I'm going back to my roots and nothing is gonna stop me from achieving my goals, doing what I believe in". "The Druids" tells about the ancient druids. "What they used to do was strip off naked, they would paint themselves completely blue, (...) and they would have belts around their waists with the severed heads of their enemies on. And they would charge the Romans. (...) They were known as the shock troops. They deliberately shocked their enemy and terrified their enemy," Toyah explained.

"Angel & Me" was influenced by seeing Jacob Epstein's sculpture The Archangel Lucifer in the Birmingham Museum and Art Gallery. Referring to the line "Why do you always cry when you come to see me? I always die to see you smile", Toyah revealed that the person she is talking to is her mother: "I was in hospital and my mum visited me, she'd always start crying. I am now [close to my mother], I didn't use to be. I always loved her very much, but she had a weird way of loving me back. I can never remember kissing and cuddling mummy and daddy when I was small. But I love them both, my father is one of my heroes".

Toyah has described "The Packt" as "a very dark song and it came from a very dark place. (...) It's often said within the deep, old, medieval scriptures of Wicca and witchcraft that when the end of the world comes you will see twin suns. So, I wanted to write something about this woman meeting the Devil and I wanted her to be a match for the Devil, (...) about using man's most sinister creation to fight the Devil back and that is kind of using the atom bomb to destroy the Devil. (...) It's about the power of femininity, it's about the Devil destroying femininity, but also I think it's quite a winning song, even though in the middle eight the nuclear bomb goes off and skin melts from our bones. (...) We are not skin and bones, we are much more. And we go beyond the physical, we go beyond the body, and I believe we are eternal. And I think the Devil is fixated with the flesh. So, we can conquer the Devil eventually".

Though unattributed in the credits of any release, "The Packt"'s chorus lyrics:

Along the shore
The cloud waves break
The twin suns sink behind the lake
Strange is the night
Now black stars rise
And many moons circle
Through the skies

derive from "Cassilda’s Song" featured in the fictional play, “The King in Yellow”, invented by American writer Robert W. Chambers in his 1895 book of the same name:

Along the shore the cloud waves break,
The twin suns sink behind the lake,
The shadows lengthen
In Carcosa

Strange is the night where black stars rise,
And strange moons circle through the skies,
But stranger still is
Lost Carcosa

Discussing "Life in the Trees", Toyah said that she "wanted to write a song about the fact that nature is the all-seeing, all-controlling organism, (...) has the power to completely control and reinvent new species. (...) The pecking order within nature is exactly what we mirror within our interactive lives. (...) We had TV and we had huge corporates, such as EMI and Decca, and they were all running our lives. It's just as dog eat dog as our normal lives are".

"Run Wild, Run Free" is about "that 'break loose' moment when you realize if you don't cut ties you are never ever going to cope emotionally. (...) To survive and be the person you are you have to cut yourself free". The singer explained that the closing track "Brave New World" "is a sad love song, because I wrote most of it (...) after a tremendous row with my boyfriend. (...) I think everyone goes through the phase when they think no one in the world knows how hurt they are – experiencing a loneliness that no one knows, but everyone knows it".

== Release and promotion ==
Released in June 1982, the album peaked at number 6 on the UK Albums Chart and was certified silver in 1982 for selling more than 60,000 copies in the UK. It has spent twelve weeks on the UK charts. The album also charted in Norway, peaking at number 22. "Brave New World" was the only single taken from the album and was a Top 40 success in the UK. Although further single releases from the album were mooted, none appeared. Toyah promoted The Changeling with a 25-date concert tour which resulted in the live album Warrior Rock: Toyah on Tour. In 2012, the singer embarked on two legs of the Changeling Resurrection Tour, commemorating the 30th anniversary of the album.

The Changeling was re-released on CD in 1999 and included six bonus tracks, four of which were previously unavailable on CD, as well as the video for "Thunder in the Mountains". One of the bonus tracks was a completed out-take from the recording sessions named "Warrior Rock" which had also appeared as the B-side of the single "Brave New World". Another out-take entitled "Paradise Child" later surfaced on the Safari Records collectors album Mayhem. A rarer version entitled "Silly Little Girls" using a similar music track but with alternative lyrics (featuring Toyah Willcox improvising 'mild obscenities'), appeared on preparatory demos for the album which have since surfaced on bootleg releases. Several other instrumental tracks from the same demo sessions have never been commercially used.

In September 2023, The Changeling was re-issued by Cherry Red Records in an expanded 2 CD+DVD package, with previously unreleased demo versions.

== Track listing ==
=== Original release ===
All songs by Toyah Willcox and Joel Bogen, except where indicated.

Side one

1. "Creepy Room" – 3:20
2. "Street Creature" – 4:01
3. "Castaways" – 3:57
4. "The Druids" – 3:31
5. "Angel & Me" – 4:47

Side two

6. "The Packt" – 4:52
7. "Life in the Trees" – 3:17
8. "Dawn Chorus" (Willcox, Bogen, Phil Spalding) – 3:53
9. "Run Wild, Run Free" – 4:02
10. "Brave New World" – 5:31

1999 CD edition bonus tracks

11. "Warrior Rock" (Willcox, Bogen, Spalding) – 3:30
12. "Thunder in the Mountains" (Willcox, Adrian Lee, Nigel Glockler) – 3:50
13. "Voodoo Doll" (Willcox, Bogen, Spalding) – 4:00
14. "Good Morning Universe" – 3:38
15. "In the Fairground" – 3:14
16. "Ieya 1982" (Willcox, Bogen, Pete Bush) – 3:48

"Thunder in the Mountains" (video)

On the CD reissue, the ending of "Angel & Me" has been edited. After the song has faded out, the original vinyl version featured an echoed drum roll that resembled the sound of a door being locked – this is absent on the 1999 CD edition, but was restored on the subsequent pressing.

=== 2023 expanded deluxe edition ===
CD one

1. "Creepy Room" – 3:19
2. "Street Creature" – 4:01
3. "Castaways" – 3:57
4. "The Druids" – 3:31
5. "Angel & Me" – 5:04
6. "The Packt" – 4:52
7. "Life in the Trees" – 3:16
8. "Dawn Chorus" – 3:53
9. "Run Wild, Run Free" – 4:01
10. "Brave New World" – 5:30
11. "Warrior Rock" – 3:30
12. "Paradise Child" – 2:37
13. "Good Morning Universe" – 3:38
14. "Urban Tribesmen" – 3:29
15. "In the Fairground" – 3:19
16. "The Furious Futures" – 3:26
17. "Go Berserk (Tour Intro)" – 4:04
18. "Stand Proud" – 4:02
19. "Clapham Junction" – 2:59
20. "I Want to Be Free" (Roundhouse Session) – 2:43
21. "Dawn Chorus" (6.55 Special Version) – 3:30

CD two

Roundhouse Studios / Feb–June 1982

1. "Creepy Room" (Work in Progress Mix) – 3:29
2. "Street Creature" (Work in Progress Mix) – 4:25
3. "Castaways" (Work in Progress Mix) – 4:07
4. "The Druids" (Work in Progress Instrumental) – 3:19
5. "Angel & Me" (Work in Progress Mix) – 4:04
6. "The Packt" (Work in Progress Mix) – 4:00
7. "Life in the Trees" (Work in Progress Mix) – 3:07
8. "Dawn Chorus" (Work in Progress Mix) – 4:00
9. "Run Wild, Run Free" (Work in Progress Mix) – 3:35
10. "Brave New World" (Work in Progress Mix) – 6:05
11. "Warrior Rock" (Work in Progress Instrumental) – 3:40
12. "Paradise Child" (Instrumental Outtake) – 2:43
13. "Untitled No. 12" (Instrumental Outtake) – 3:31

Joel's Portastudio Demos / Sept 1981

14. "Chariots" (Instrumental Home Demo) – 3:31
15. "The Pied Piper" (Instrumental Home Demo) – 3:16
16. "Roxy One" (Instrumental Home Demo) – 2:55
17. "Talking to Seifert" (Instrumental Home Demo) – 2:32
18. "Piano Ballad" (Instrumental Home Demo) – 3:10
19. "Anger" (Instrumental Home Demo) – 4:11
20. "Bus Station for Heroes" (Instrumental Home Demo) – 3:38

DVD

Toyah Interviews 2023

1. "Creating The Changeling"
2. "Track by Track Commentary"

Live & Unplugged 2018

3. "Good Morning Universe"
4. "Brave New World"
5. "Angel & Me"

Promo Video

6. "Brave New World" (Promo Video)
7. "Brave New World" (Outtake Footage)

BBC Television Appearances

8. "Good Morning Universe" (Top of the Pops)
9. "It's a Mystery" (Top of the Pops Xmas Party)
10. "I Want to Be Free" (British Rock & Pop Awards 1981)
11. "Brave New World" (Get Set for Summer)
12. "Street Creature" (Get Set for Summer)
13. "Castaways" (Get Set for Summer)
14. "Brave New World" (Cheggers Plays Pop)
15. "Dawn Chorus" (Nationwide)
16. "Dawn Chorus" (Pebble Mill 6.55 Special)
17. "Ieya 1982" (Pebble Mill 6.55 Special)
18. "Street Creature" (Three of a Kind)

== Personnel ==
Band members

- Toyah Willcox – vocals and noises
- Joel Bogen – guitar, additional keyboards, vocals
- Andy Clark – keyboards
- Phil Spalding – bass, vocals
- Simon Phillips – drums and percussion

Additional musicians

- Simon Darlow – additional keyboards
- Nigel Bennett – backing vocals
- Phil Smith, Vince Sullavan, Dave Lord – brass

Production

- Steve Lillywhite – producer
- Mark Dearnley – engineer
- Ashley Howe – additional engineering
- Neil Hutchinson – assistant engineer, tape operator

== Charts ==
=== Weekly charts ===
Chart (1982)	Peak position
Norwegian Albums (VG-lista)	22
UK Albums (Official Charts Company)	6
UK Independent Albums	2

Chart (2023)	Peak position
Scottish Albums	19
UK Albums (Official Charts Company)	79
UK Vinyl Albums	11
UK Independent Albums	9

=== Year-end charts ===
Chart (1982)	Peak position
UK Independent Albums	11

== Certifications ==
Region	Certification	Certified units/sales
United Kingdom (BPI)	Silver	60,000^{^}
^{^} Shipments figures based on certification alone.
