= Invasion Planet Earth =

- Directed by: Simon Cox
- Written by: Simon Cox
- Produced by: Simon Cox
- Starring: Simon Haycock; Lucy Drive; Julie Hoult; Danny Steele; Sophie Anderson; Toyah Willcox
- Edited by: Simon Cox
- Music by: Benjamin Symons
- Production company: AlphaStar Productions
- Release date: December 5, 2019
- Running time: 98 minutes
- Country: United Kingdom
- Language: English

Invasion Planet Earth is a 2019 British science fiction film written and directed by Simon Cox, with the original title Kaleidoscope Man. It tells the story of a man who learns that he is going to become a father on the same day as Earth is invaded by aliens.

Filming was supported by crowdfunding and took place over ten years, with many scenes filmed in Birmingham. The cast includes Toyah Willcox, with a cameo appearance from Ben Shockley. Willcox also contributed a song to the film, "Step into the New World", played over end credits. In 2021, Simon Cox began fundraising for a second film, Of Infinite Worlds.

In 2022, film shots from the accompanying documentary The Making of Invasion Planet Earth were falsely presented on the internet as evidence of fabricated attacks as part of the 2022 Russian invasion of Ukraine.

== Cast ==
- Simon Haycock – Thomas Dunn
- Lucy Drive – Mandy Dunn
- Julie Hoult – Harriet
- Danny Steele – Floyd
- Sophie Anderson – Samantha
- Toyah Willcox – Claire Dove
- Jon Campling – Lucian
- Michael Bott – Jeff Phillburn
- Kate Speak – Claire Dangerfield
- Julian Boote – Alan Carter
- John Dyer – Carl Henderson
- Ian Brooker – Father Robert
- Nina Stratford – President of the United States
- Ben Shockley – Billy McCoy
- Jessica Walker – School Girl
