= The Acoustic Album (Toyah Willcox album) =

Studio album by Toyah
- Released: October 1996
- Genre: New wave; pop rock
- Length: 62:18
- Label: Going for a Song; Aardvark
- Producer: Oliver Davis; David Richardson

Toyah chronology
Looking Back (1995)	The Acoustic Album (1996)	Velvet Lined Shell (2003)

The Acoustic Album is a studio album by the British singer Toyah Willcox, released in 1996. It is a collection of acoustic re-recordings of songs from her back catalogue.

== Background ==
The material was recorded in 1994 and consisted of new, stripped-down versions of classic hits as well as lesser-known, non-single tracks from the Toyah band and Willcox's solo repertoire. Some tracks feature string arrangements performed by members of the Royal Philharmonic Orchestra. The material was originally conceived as part of a double album Toyah Classics which would have also comprised its 'electric' accompaniment Looking Back, slated for release in March 1995. The two sets would eventually be released individually as separate albums. In 2014, The Acoustic Album was re-released by Vertical Species in digital and CD formats, with a new artwork by Alan Sawyers and photography by Dean Stockings.

== Track listing ==
1. "The Vow" (Toyah Willcox, Joel Bogen, Phil Spalding) – 3:19
2. "Moonlight Dancing" (Willcox, Bogen, Nick Graham) – 4:03
3. "Revive the World" (Willcox, Tony Geballe) – 3:13
4. "I Want to Be Free" (Willcox, Bogen) – 3:02
5. "It's a Mystery" (Piano Version) (Keith Hale) – 4:05
6. "Danced" (Willcox, Bogen, Peter Bush) – 4:44
7. "Good Morning Universe" (Willcox, Bogen) – 3:24
8. "Blue Meanings" (Willcox, Bogen, Bush) – 5:20
9. "Jungles of Jupiter" (Willcox, Bogen, Spalding) – 4:55
10. "It's a Mystery" (Up Tempo) (Hale) – 3:56
11. "Ieya" (Willcox, Bogen, Bush) – 4:35
12. "Angels and Demons" (Willcox, Hale) – 6:07
13. "I Am" (Willcox, Bogen) – 2:53
14. "Thunder in the Mountains" (Willcox, Adrian Lee, Nigel Glockler) – 4:02
15. "It's a Mystery" (String Version) (Hale) – 3:57

== Personnel ==
- Toyah Willcox – vocals
- Tony 'Pooh' Kelly – guitars
- David Waddington – guitar
- Bob Skeat – bass, acoustic bass
- Andy Dewar – drums, percussion
- Tacye Lynette – additional vocals

Additional musicians

- The principal string players of the Royal Philharmonic Orchestra headed by Jonathan Carney on tracks 1 and 15

Production

- Oliver Davis – producer
- Paul Maddens – engineer
- David Richardson – executive producer
