= Hairy Jeremy =

1988 French children's TV series

- Genre: Stop Motion; Children's
- Created by: Franck Flanquart; Pierre Scarella
- Directed by: Franck Flanquart (1983 short film) Pierre Scarella (1983 short film) Francis Finidori (1988 television series) Jean-Louis Porte (1988 television Series)
- Music by: Christophe Heral (Original French version); Ten Pin Alley (English Version)
- Countries of origin: France; South Korea
- Original language: French
- No. of seasons: 1
- No. of episodes: 26 (English)

Production
- Executive producer: Theresa Plummer Andrews (BBC)
- Animator: Yoon Jee Won
- Running time: 3 minutes (Short Film); 3–4 minutes
- Production companies: Arimage Production; Joong-Ang Daily News; Video 13 Production

Original release
- Network: FR3; CBBC
- Release: 1990 – 1995

Hairy Jeremy (Jérémie des Cavernes in French) is a 1988 French/South Korean animated television show by Franck Flanquart and Pierre Scarella, who originally created it as a short film in 1983 that would serve as the series. It debuted in 1990 on FR3, and was later dubbed in the United Kingdom in 1992 and shown on CBBC between 1994 and 1999. It was narrated by Toyah Willcox.

The show focuses on a caveman called Hairy Jeremy and his misadventures he has with his prehistoric friends.

== Characters ==
- Hairy Jeremy - A Caveman with a face so hairy that only his nose is visible. Whenever he's surprised, his eyes do appear. He is a friendly caveman, but sometimes gets grumpy whenever he's annoyed or anyone disturbs his naps.
- Arabella - An orange furred Platypus, a friend of Hairy Jeremy.
- Milly & Tilly - Emu twins who the Narrator often gets muddled.
- Opterod - A posh speaking mustached grey dinosaur with ears. In "Toothache" he was called Bernard.
- Chucklesaurus - A small green dinosaur who is a practical joker to Hairy Jeremy.
- Squawk - A talkative bird that talks in squawks.
- Eggheads - Elephant-like egg shaped creatures with big noses and small ears that allow them to fly.
- Kite Birds - Little blue birds that look like kites.
- Terry Dactyl - A Pterodactyl who is not only bad at flying, but is also bad at landing.
- Dino Monster - Huge dinosaurs that the friends are sometimes scared of.
- Baby Dino - A baby dinosaur of the dino monster.

== Episodes ==
No.	Title	Original release date
1	"April Fools Day"	1992
April Fools Day has come, and that could only mean Chucklesaurus is out to prank Hairy Jeremy. Even when he was pushed to the brink of pushing Chucklesaurus off a cliff, and him ending up having to rescue him, it was Chucklesaurus who had the last laugh.
2	"Big Top Flop"	1992
Hairy Jeremy rounded up the Eggheads in order to take part in his own circus, only for it to turn into a big flop once the Eggheads began showing off.
3	"Egg Head"	1992
Hairy Jeremy finds and egg and hatches it, only to find it being a baby Dino Monster, crying for its mother, so he decided to return it to its rightful parent.
4	"Hide and Seek"	1992
Arabella is bored and wants Hairy Jeremy to play with her, but only made him cross when she kept interrupting his nap. This made Hairy Jeremy guilty and decided to look for her, without realising that she all the while was playing hide and seek.
5	"Ice To See You"	1992
Snow has fallen, and as Hairy Jeremy was wondering, he was insulted by Chucklesaurus for making a snowman that looked just like him. When he built a wood fire to keep himself warm, all of his friends were invited to share the warmth, except for Chucklesaurus, which he left to freeze overnight. The next day, Hairy Jeremy was so ashamed for what he has done, that he didn't notice the thaw that them thawed out his friend.
6	"Quiet"	1992
Hairy Jeremy is trying to take his nap, only to be disturbed by his friends. He then tried putting on his music, only to end up ignoring the warnings of Terry Dactyl falling out of the sky, and crashing on top of him.
7	"Road to Ruin"	1992
Hairy Jeremy had an idea with the Eggheads to construct a Motorway in order to go to far away places, only to find the noise, the traffic, and the dust kicked into his cave far too much for Hairy Jeremy.
8	"Self Raising Flour"	1992
Hairy Jeremy has a venus flytrap growing in his cave, and a mystery of his food getting eaten when his back is turned, He had Arabella keep watch over his food, but when he saw his food gone and only her fur left, thinking his flower tried to eat her he kicked it out of his house. Third time he thought Arabella had eaten it, only to find that it was actually his flower that has now grown into a climber around his cave.
9	"Snapshot"	1992
Hairy Jeremy took photos of all his friends, but try as he might, couldn't take one of himself. So he decided to create a board of his torso, in order to have his picture taken.
10	"The Big Fight"	1992
Two Dino Monsters compete for champion in a fighting ring, with Hairy Jeremy only wishing to be one. The fight ended in a draw, and Hairy Jeremy took the winner's crown.
11	"Toothache"	1992
A Dino Monster was following Hairy Jeremy, and while doing so was scaring Hairy Jeremy's friends. The reason when Hairy Jeremy found out, was that the Dino Monster was having toothache and wants him to help pull his tooth out.
12	"Zero Hero"	1992
The animals all thought Hairy Jeremy actually killed a Dino Monster, and actually hailed him as a hero, when actually Hairy Jeremy was trying to swat mosquitoes with his club and happened to be close to a Dino Monster that was actually sleeping.
13	TBA	1992
