= Brave New World (song) =

Single by Toyah

from the album The Changeling
- B-side: "Warrior Rock"
- Released: May 1982
- Recorded: 1982
- Genre: New wave
- Length: 5:31 (full album version); 3:41 (single and video edit)
- Label: Safari
- Songwriter(s): Toyah Willcox; Joel Bogen
- Producer(s): Steve Lillywhite

Toyah singles chronology
"Thunder in the Mountains" (1981)	"Brave New World" (1982)	"Ieya" (1982)

Music video
- "Brave New World" on YouTube

"Brave New World" is a song by the English new wave band Toyah, fronted by Toyah Willcox, released as a single in 1982 by Safari Records. It promoted Toyah's 1982 studio album The Changeling and was a top-40 chart success in the UK.

== Background ==
The song was written by Toyah Willcox and Joel Bogen, and produced by Steve Lillywhite. Toyah has described it as "a sad love song, because I wrote most of it (...) after a tremendous row with my boyfriend. But I could never do a love song true to myself, because that's being selfish. I prefer what I call open lyrics, so that the kids can fit their own feelings to them... And so [it] is a love song, because I think everyone goes through the phase when they think no one in the world knows how hurt they are – experiencing a loneliness that no one knows, but everyone knows it". The singer also opined that Bogen's guitar line in the song would subsequently be copied on records by other bands, including U2.

"Brave New World" was released in May 1982 as the first and only single from The Changeling. It was available as a 7" vinyl single as well as a picture disc. The cover photograph was taken by Roger Charity and features Toyah in make-up painted by the artist Caroline Cohen. The single included the exclusive non-album song "Warrior Rock" on side B, which was included in the 1999 CD re-release of The Changeling. The single edit of "Brave New World" featured on the 2005 compilation The Safari Singles Collection Part 2: 1981–1983.

The single made it to the Top 40 in the UK Singles Chart, peaking at number 21 in June 1982. It also reached number 4 in the UK Independent Singles Chart. In March 2023, after its re-release on a limited 10" red vinyl, it entered a number of UK sales charts.

== Music video ==
The "Brave New World" music video was directed by David Mallet and used a shorter version of the track. The opening scene where Toyah comes out of the sea was filmed in Hastings. Other parts of the clip were filmed later that day in front of the Battersea Power Station in London, picturing Toyah riding a white horse. The video was inspired by David Bowie's "Ashes to Ashes" also directed by Mallet. Despite the apparent influence of Bowie's video, Toyah herself has denied any attempt to copy him: "I'd never dream of trying to be like Bowie, because he's the greatest".

== Track listing ==
- 7" single

A. "Brave New World" – 3:41
B. "Warrior Rock" – 3:29

- 10" single

A1. "Brave New World" (Razzmatazz Mix)
A2. "Street Creature" (Razzmatazz Mix)
B1. "Dawn Chorus" (6.55 Special Version)
B2. "Ieya 1982" (Edited Version)

== Personnel ==
- Toyah Willcox – vocals
- Joel Bogen – guitar
- Phil Spalding – bass
- Simon Phillips – drums
- Simon Darlow – keyboards

== Charts ==
Chart (1982)	Peak position
UK Singles (Official Charts Company)	21
UK Independent Singles	4

Chart (2023)	Peak position
UK Vinyl Singles (Official Charts Company)	2
UK Physical Singles (Official Charts Company)	3
UK Singles Sales (Official Charts Company)	26
