= David Richardson (sound engineer) =

English producer and sound engineer

David Richardson (born in Harpenden, Hertfordshire, England) is an English music producer, audio engineer and musician. He founded Sky Studios with rock band Jethro Tull, the studio later became leading facilities house, Sound Recording Technology (SRT).

== History ==
Richardson learned piano from the age of four and developed a passion for electronics and sound recording. By his teens, he was already recording top Jazz artists of the day; this included names such as Kathy Stobart and Ian Carr. As a young producer, he had production contracts with major labels like CBS (now Sony Music) and George Martin's Air label, distributed by EMI. Apart from early roots in Jazz and Rock music he also produced Pop records with artists that included Jet Harris and The Tornados, the SRT label was founded as an independent in the early 1970s. Many of Richardson's productions as vinyl pressings are much sought after, such as Grannie, which according to Record Collector is one of the most valuable original pressings of all time.

The original SRT Studios were based in Guildford Street, Luton, where bands such as McGregor's Engine recorded. It was this band, with local guitarist Mick Abrahams, drummer Clive Bunker and bassist Andy Pyle that formed the foundation of Jethro Tull which, with the addition of multi-instrumentalist Ian Anderson, went on to sell over 60 million albums. Andy Pyle was featured on many early SRT recordings and later became a member of Wishbone Ash.

The SRT studios moved from Luton to Shefford, Bedfordshire where facilities included mastering lacquers for vinyl manufacture. Local folk rock bands that recorded there included Back Alley Choir, and Halcyon, the drummer of which was Nigel Pegrum, who went on to join Steeleye Span. The Shefford studios closed in the mid-seventies. SRT had offices in North Finchley and for many years the SRT production company used many different recording studios.

Recording of northern artists formed a large part of the SRT catalogue, reflecting the booming 1970s club scene, with many of those recordings produced at Fairview Studios in Hull. The label included many popular bands from the Sheffield area, such as New Jersey Turnpike. This included talented vocalist, keyboard player and electronics enthusiast Ivor Drawmer, later to be the founder of Drawmer Audio Compressors. Another popular SRT Sheffield Band included O'Hara's Playboys. Included in the large roster of Club acts were artists such as Frankie Vaughan and entertainers Cannon and Ball, when at the peak of their Saturday night TV success, in the early 1980s, he co-wrote and produced Cannon and Ball's "Rock On Tommy" single. The album received a silver disc presented by Chris Tarrant on the ATV Saturday morning programme, Tiswas. Apart from music production, SRT was one of the first manufacturing brokers and had a close relationship with Abbey Road Studios, where artists were encouraged to attend the cutting of the pressing lacquers for their forthcoming vinyl releases. With no complete record of all SRT's early releases, some online sources have started to catalogue many of the vintage SRT vinyl products.

=== Manufacturing ===
In the mid-1980s, he started a record factory in St Ives, Cambridgeshire with business partner George Bellamy (formerly of The Tornados and father of Matt Bellamy of rock band Muse). As an engineer he became interested and specialised in process control as a challenge set to him by RCA (now Sony Music), he created a method to produce a perfect five-piece extrusion moulding; the first perfectly playable audio picture disc. At this point, no one had been able to create discs within a constant tolerance and without severe warping. In this procedure, he was the first engineer to incorporate fuzzy logic into the process control of the record press by building his logic controllers. He thus achieved RCA's quality goal, helping the factory to gain further substantial clients including Virgin and Island. The new system produced many very collectible chart-topping products, including Frankie Goes to Hollywood, Eurythmics and Boy George.

=== Mastering ===
After vinyl started to decline, Richardson turned his passion towards digital audio. Inspired by his experience in cutting the master acetate discs for vinyl record manufacturing, he became interested in developing mastering for the Compact Disc. One observation he made was that many people were transferring analogue tapes raw to digital, not realising the cutting engineer in the past would have added EQ compression and even reverb to the final disc cut. He found that using his skills as a producer and recording engineer he could add the final audio touch to the digital masters. His work rapidly became a big success and SRT's audio facility grew to contain six studios. He was one of the first people in the world in the mid 1990s, to use 32-Bit Digital EQ. Richardson created the audio for a wide range of back catalogue giving older recording new success, some of which included the chart-topping album One Step Beyond and the biggest-selling Jazz CD of the 1990s, Jazz on a Summer's Day, making new hits of "Take Five" and "The Girl from Ipanema". Being an engineer at the start of the digital audio revolution, his work, plus the training of many technicians, contributed towards establishing the present importance of audio mastering, now a standard embellishment process for most commercial audio products and in particular CD audio.

== Classical recordings ==
In addition to his work on commercial audio products, he was also a leader in the creation of the first 20-bit recordings and an early exponent of Sony's Super Bit Mapping noise shaping. With a team of staff under his supervision, he recorded over 120 high-bit classical albums with the Royal Philharmonic Orchestra, working with some of the world’s leading performers and conductors, such as the late Yehudi Menuhin and Sir Charles Mackerras. The narration for Peter and The Wolf was produced by Richardson and recorded in London with the actor Sir John Gielgud. Sound Recording Technology's classical team recorded the RPO series on its own Mitsubishi 20-bit reel-to-reel machines in many locations, including CTS Studios in Wembley, Watford Town Hall, Abbey Road and at SRT's studios in Edison Road, St Ives, Cambridgeshire. Each of the recordings was subject to 20-bit Sadie music editing, plus 32-bit sound enhancements. The final recordings received critical acclaim in the leading classical publication Gramophone and most of the recordings are still widely available. In 1997, he and his music team collaborated with Buckingham Palace to produce the official recording to commemorate the decommissioning of HMY Britannia. The recording was of British music performed by the Royal Philharmonic Orchestra and Chorus conducted by Carl Davis; it includes material such as "Coronation Scot", "Jerusalem" and "Rule, Britannia!". The production team included: music producer, Matthew Dilley; location sound recordist, Richard Millard; Editor, Andrew Lang; and Richardson who was the executive producer. The final edited 20-bit master was treated with 32-bit sound processing and then scaled to the final master using a new format at the time, HDCD.

== Present ==
In 1999, Richardson took a break from Sound Recording Technology, spending more time in his Spanish home. For several years, he hosted a late-night chat show on Central Radio in Andalucia.

In 2006 he opened mastering and post-production facilities in Kensington, under the name Chapel Kensington. This included a busy voice-over and Avid video editing facility. In 2008, among many projects, he created a new 5.1 surround soundtrack for the original cult series The Prisoner, which was re-released having been visually restored from the original film footage. Other projects ranged from mastering new compilations with artists such as Eddy Grant to working for Notting Hill Music, mastering music by Beyoncé, Will Smith, Pussycat Dolls, Level 42, New Order and Bronski Beat. He also mastered the audio for the TV show Hollyoaks and music for Dancing on Ice.

Recent projects include work for Demon Music Group, (a division of BBC Worldwide) preparing masters for the new CD, online and vinyl releases that include Average White Band, Squeeze, Buzzcocks, Rick Wakeman, OMD, Ten Years After, Uriah Heap, Spandau Ballet, Gary Numan, Fairport Convention, Asia, Lindisfarne, Sad Café, The Strawbs, Belinda Carlisle and Wishbone Ash. Recent restoration work has included masters of classic standard repertoire from Quincy Jones to Frank Sinatra, as well as jazz artists including Miles Davis.

Chapel Kensington's London studio was moved in June 2015. The studio operation is now working under the original brand name SRT (Sound Recording Technology), thus embracing four decades of reputation, concentrating on mastering all audio formats, including online mastering. It is based in Richardson's original and present hometown of Harpenden, Hertfordshire. Also working in the business is his son Jack Richardson.

In September 2015, Richardson was featured in a programme broadcast on BBC Radio 4, where he spoke about the early history of SRT's studio in Luton.
