= Vampires Rock =

- The Musical
- Premiere: January 29, 2004

Vampires Rock is a musical stage show which premiered in 2004.

It is performed by the group headed by Steve Steinman, who had appeared on Stars in Their Eyes as Meat Loaf. The group has toured for several years with The Meat Loaf Story.

Set in the year 2030 in New York City populated by The Undead. Baron Von Rockula, owner of the Live and Let Die Club, is in search of a bride, and must eventually convince her to agree to eternal immorality.

The show features a number of notable rock anthems, including songs from Meat Loaf, Rainbow, Guns N' Roses, AC/DC, Alice Cooper, The Rolling Stones, Bon Jovi, Queen, Whitesnake, and Bonnie Tyler.

The shows main cast members have included Toyah Willcox and Steve Steinman. As part of Liverpool's European Capital Of Culture year, she performed for the first time at the newly opened Liverpool Echo Arena and Conference Centre. In 2009 a new version of Vampires Rock was created, called Vampires Rock Christmas.

Steinman later toured with a new show for Vampires Rock. This is called Vampires Rock: Ghost Train!

In March 2017 Steinman launched a new show called Iconic. The show features hits from films such as James Bond, Iron Man, Kill Bill and many others.

It has been announced that in 2019 Sam Bailey, UK’s X Factor season 10 winner, will be joining Steinman on stage as his Vampire Queen.
