= Ophelia's Shadow =

- 2003 re-release cover

Studio album by Toyah
- Released: February 1991
- Studio: Courthouse Studio, Manchester
- Genre: Progressive rock; avant-pop
- Length: 47:32
- Label: E.G.
- Producer: Toyah Willcox; Tony Arnold

Toyah chronology
| Prostitute (1988) | Ophelia's Shadow (1991) | Take the Leap! (1993) |

Professional ratings
Review scores
| Source | Rating |
|---|---|
| AllMusic | 4/5 stars |
| Billboard | Positive |
| New Musical Express | 4/10 |

Ophelia's Shadow is the fourth solo studio album by the British singer Toyah Willcox, released in 1991 by E.G. Records. Some musicians playing on this album have been members of King Crimson at a certain moment, people like Robert Fripp, Gordon Haskell, Keith Tippett and Trey Gunn.

== Background ==
The album was created with Tony Geballe as well as Trey Gunn and Paul Beavis with whom Toyah and her husband Robert Fripp constituted the band Sunday All Over the World at the same time. It was originally planned as part two of a trilogy, following Prostitute. The title is a reference to Ophelia, a character from William Shakespeare's Hamlet, and Carl Jung's psychological concept of the shadow.

In 2003, the album was reissued via Toyah's own Vertical Species label with a slightly changed artwork and new text introduction. In 2020, it was released as part of the Toyah Solo box set.

== Track listing ==
1. "Ophelia's Shadow" (Trey Gunn, Toyah Willcox, Tony Geballe, Paul Beavis) – 5:54
2. "The Shaman Says" (Geballe, Willcox) – 5:23
3. "Brilliant Day" (Willcox, Robert Fripp, Gunn, Beavis) – 2:39
4. "Prospect" (Geballe, Willcox) – 3:13
5. "Turning Tide" (Geballe, Willcox) – 5:40
6. "Take What You Will" (Beavis, Geballe, Gunn, Willcox) – 5:42
7. "Ghost Light" (Gunn, Willcox, Geballe, Beavis) – 4:28
8. "The Woman Who Had an Affair with Herself" (Geballe, Willcox) – 4:17
9. "Homeward" (Geballe, Willcox) – 5:16
10. "Lords of the Never Known" (Willcox, Fripp, Gunn, Beavis) – 4:32

== Personnel ==
- Toyah Willcox – vocals, producer, engineer, mixing
- Tony Geballe – guitar, computer, engineer
- Trey Gunn – stick, keyboards, engineer
- Paul Beavis – drums, percussion

Additional musicians

- Robert Fripp – guitar on tracks 3 and 10 (uncredited), mixing
- Keith Tippett – keyboards on track 10
- Gordon Haskell – keyboard intro on track 1

Production

- Tony Arnold – backing tracks producer, engineer
