= Thunder in the Mountains =

Single by Toyah
- B-side: "Street Addict"; "Voodoo Doll"
- Released: October 1981
- Recorded: 1981
- Studio: Marquee Studios, London
- Genre: New wave
- Length: 3:40
- Label: Safari
- Songwriters: Toyah Willcox; Adrian Lee; Nigel Glockler
- Producer: Nick Tauber

Toyah singles chronology
"I Want to Be Free" (1981)	"Thunder in the Mountains" (1981)	"Brave New World" (1982)

Music video
- "Thunder in the Mountains" on YouTube

"Thunder in the Mountains" is a song by the English new wave band Toyah, fronted by Toyah Willcox, released as a single in 1981 by Safari Records. It was one of Toyah's biggest hits, reaching number 4 in the UK chart.

== Background ==
The song was written by Toyah Willcox, Adrian Lee and Nigel Glockler, and produced by Nick Tauber. It was written in summer 1981 under a huge pressure due to the commercial success that the band was having at that time. "I had about four hours to write this lyric before the car took me to the Marquee Studios in the West End where we were to record the song and then it was to go straight to print. (...) There were riots going on in all the main cities at this particular weekend. There was general unrest. (...) I wanted to reflect this in the song that I see you, I hear you, let's all rebel together, let's bring positive change", Toyah reflected.

"Thunder in the Mountains" was released as a standalone single in October 1981. The cover photo was taken by John Swannell, with Toyah's make-up by Richard Shara and hair by Robert Lobetta, and was named by the singer as her favourite record sleeve. It became the most collectible Toyah release to date, with several variations available, including a 7" picture disc and a 12" transparent vinyl. The song was backed with two B-sides, "Street Addict" and "Voodoo Doll", the latter exclusive to the 12" single. Although not included on an album at the time, "Thunder in the Mountains" and "Voodoo Doll" would appear on the 1999 CD reissue of The Changeling, "Street Addict" on the 2002 CD reissue of The Blue Meaning, and all three tracks feature on the 2005 compilation The Safari Singles Collection Part 2: 1981–1983.

The single continued the success of Toyah's previous hits. It reached number 4 in the UK Singles Chart and also was the band's third consecutive number 1 entry in the UK Independent Singles Chart. It was eventually certified silver in the UK. The song was promoted by an appearance on Top of the Pops. The song received a favourable review in Smash Hits.

"Thunder in the Mountains" has been re-recorded by Toyah a number of times in her later career: in 1993 on the album Take the Leap!, on Looking Back in 1995, and on The Acoustic Album, again in 1995. During a 2012 concert at the Hare & Hounds in Birmingham, Toyah performed the song live as a duet with Andi Fraggs.

== Music video ==
The music video for the song was directed by Godley & Creme.

== Track listing ==
- 7" single

A. "Thunder in the Mountains" (Toyah Willcox, Adrian Lee, Nigel Glockler) – 3:40
B. "Street Addict" (Willcox, Joel Bogen, Phil Spalding) – 5:15

- 12" single

A. "Thunder in the Mountains" (Willcox, Lee, Glockler) – 3:53
B1. "Street Addict" (Willcox, Bogen, Spalding) – 5:22
B2. "Voodoo Doll" (Willcox, Bogen, Spalding, Lee, Glockler) – 3:58

== Personnel ==
- Toyah Willcox – vocals
- Joel Bogen – guitar
- Phil Spalding – bass
- Nigel Glockler – drums
- Adrian Lee – keyboards

== Charts ==
Chart (1981)	Peak position
Irish Singles (IRMA)	10
UK Singles (Official Charts Company)	4
UK Independent Singles	1

== Certifications ==
Region	Certification	Certified units/sales
United Kingdom (BPI)	Silver	250,000^{^}
^{^} Shipments figures based on certification alone.
