= Toyah Willcox =

English singer-songwriter, actress and television presenter (born 1958)

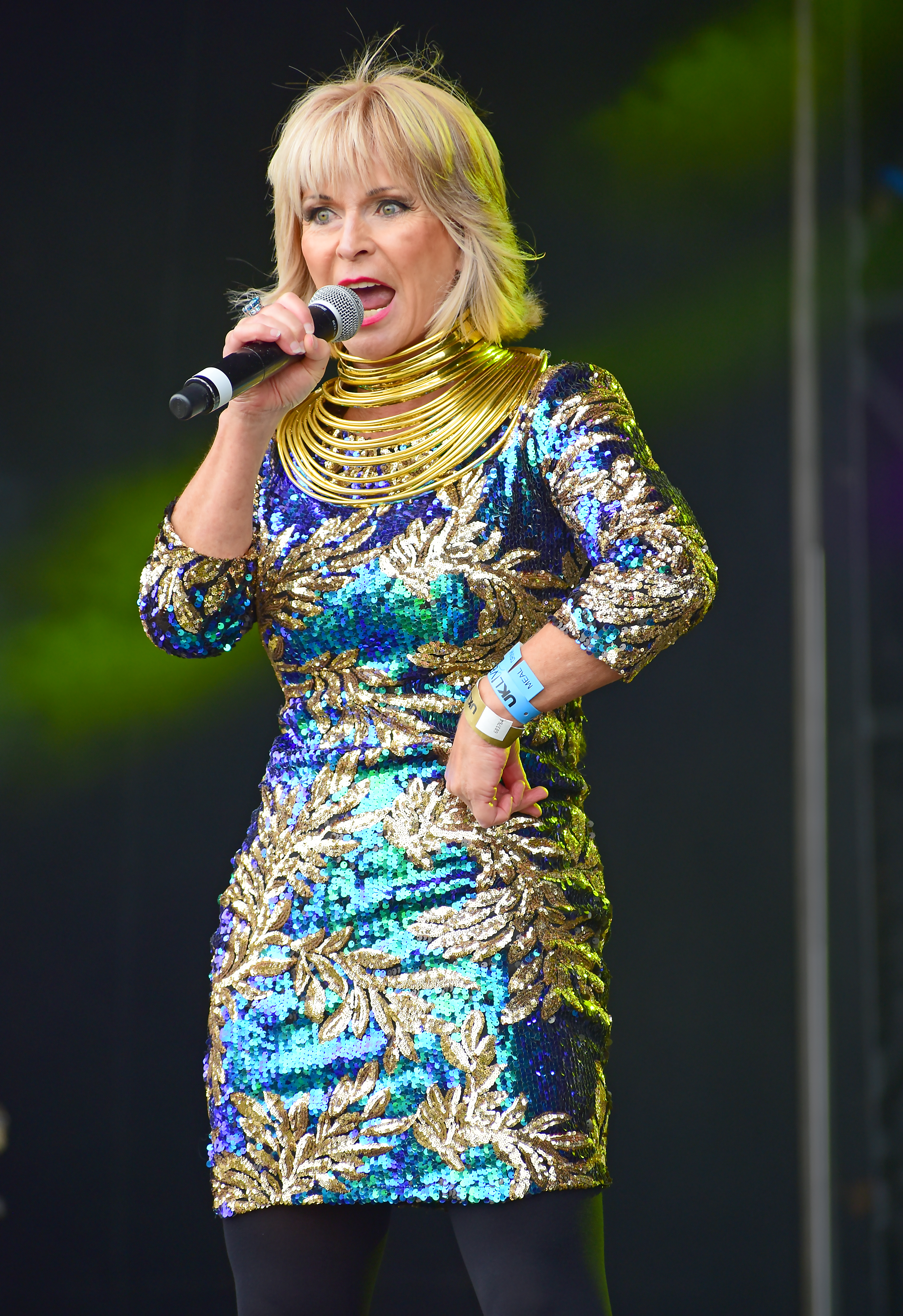
- Willcox performing live at Let's Rock Liverpool in 2021
- Born: Toyah Ann Willcox; 18 May 1958 (age 68); Kings Heath, Birmingham, England
- Other name: Toyah
- Occupations: Singer; songwriter; actress; television presenter
- Years active: 1976–present
- Musical career
- Genres: Post-punk; new wave; rock; pop rock
- Labels: Safari; Portrait; Aardvark; E.G.; Zomba Music Group
- Formerly of: Toyah
- Spouse: Robert Fripp (m. 1986)
- Website: toyahwillcox.com

Toyah Ann Willcox (born 18 May 1958) is an English singer-songwriter, actress, and television presenter. In a career spanning more than five decades, she has had eight top 40 singles, released more than 20 albums, written two books, appeared in more than 40 stage plays and 10 feature films, and voiced and presented numerous television shows.

Between 1977 and 1983, Willcox fronted the eponymous band Toyah, before embarking on a solo career in the mid-1980s. At the Brit Awards 1982, Willcox was nominated for British Breakthrough Act, and Best Female Solo Artist. She was nominated a further two times in this category in 1983, and in 1984. Her hit singles, which she co-wrote, include "It's a Mystery", "Thunder in the Mountains" and "I Want to Be Free".

Willcox is married to English guitarist Robert Fripp.

== Early life ==
Willcox was born on 18 May 1958 in Kings Heath, Birmingham. Her father Beric Willcox ran a successful joinery business and owned three factories. Her mother Barbara Joy (née Rollinson), was a professional dancer, with whom he had fallen in love after seeing her on stage in Weston-super-Mare with singing and comedy double act Flanagan and Allen, and married in 1949. Her mother gave up her career after giving birth to Willcox's elder sister and brother. Willcox has suggested her first name could be a reference to the town of Toyah, Texas, or to the Native American word "toyah" meaning water, although she notes her parents deny both origins.

Willcox enjoyed a financially comfortable childhood, attending a private girls' school, but was bullied. Requiring physiotherapy for a spinal condition, she behaved violently towards her mother, to whom she was close. An absentee pupil and frequently rebellious, she sat O-levels a year late owing to corrective surgery on her feet. She achieved one O-level pass, in music. Alienated by her background and surroundings, her rebellious behaviour led to her shunning male company and adopting an aggressive and flamboyant identity.

Her early interest in music, dance and acting, combined with her alienation, and her uncertainty regarding her sexuality, led Willcox to seek an outlet, initially in acting and then in music. She attended the Old Rep Drama School in Birmingham, paying privately because she was denied a grant, the assessor noting: "She has a lisp and isn't attractive." She began working as a dresser in local theatres, including The Alexandra, Birmingham, and the Birmingham Hippodrome. Because of her distinctive appearance and gaudily dyed hair, repertory actors referred to her as "The Bird of Paradise." A friend's suggestion that she should see the Sex Pistols led to her being attracted to the punk movement, but she resolved to do better, travelling to London to take up a career in acting and music.

== Career ==
=== 1976–1979: Career beginnings ===
After appearing as an extra in a drama being made at the BBC Pebble Mill Studios in Birmingham, an opening came to take a role in Glitter (1976), a play in the BBC Second City Firsts series, alongside Noel Edmonds and Phil Daniels. Recommended to the play's director by a member of the wardrobe department because of her distinctive appearance and oddball character, Willcox was given the role of Sue, a girl who sang with the band Bilbo and who dreamed of appearing on Top of the Pops. In the course of the 30-minute play, Willcox performed two songs she had co-written: "Floating Free" (an acoustic ballad, with Phil Daniels accompanying her on guitar) and "Dream Maker". The play was seen by Kate Nelligan and Maximilian Schell, who offered her work with the National Theatre in London, where she got the part of Emma in Tales from the Vienna Woods, directed by Schell. The opening led to her relocating to London.

In 1977, while playing Emma in Tales from the Vienna Woods at the National Theatre, Willcox, inspired by her role as a musician in Glitter, fronted a band called Toyah which featured Joel Bogen on guitar, Mark Henry on bass, Steve Bray on drums, Peter Bush on keyboards, and herself on vocals. Having never considered herself a musician, she found herself lead singer of a successful band, although still uncertain about her own sexuality and repelled by her bandmates' antics with groupies.

Introduced by actor Ian Charleson to director Derek Jarman, Willcox was offered 'any part you want' in Jubilee (called Down with the Queen at the time). Plagued by budgetary issues, the film featured Willcox as the murderous 'Mad', as well as a number of other prominent figures from the punk scene, including Siouxsie Sioux, Adam Ant and Richard O'Brien. She went on to play 'Monkey' in the 1979 film of The Who's Quadrophenia, having been introduced to director Franc Roddam through an association with John Lydon. Willcox demanded the part of Monkey from Roddam. She completed filming despite requiring medical attention for pneumonia.

The possibility of a role in the Sex Pistols' film, The Great Rock 'n' Roll Swindle under director Russ Meyer having fallen through, Willcox went on to play Miranda in Jarman's film The Tempest which won her a nomination as Best Newcomer at the 1980 Evening Standard Awards. Continuing a stage career alongside film work, in 1979, on London's Royal Court Theatre stage, Willcox played Sharon in Nigel Williams' Sugar and Spice, Tallulah in Stephen Poliakoff's American Days at the ICA, playing alongside Mel Smith, Antony Sher and Phil Daniels and taking a film role opposite Katharine Hepburn in the made-for-television film The Corn Is Green, directed by George Cukor.

Willcox found her dual careers as a musician and actress frequently in conflict, leading to confusion as to which role constituted a 'compartment' to put her into. Feeling her musical career was not taken as seriously as her acting, she nevertheless viewed her acting role as 'highbrow' and her musical career as 'lowbrow'.

=== 1980–1983: Toyah and gaining punk status ===
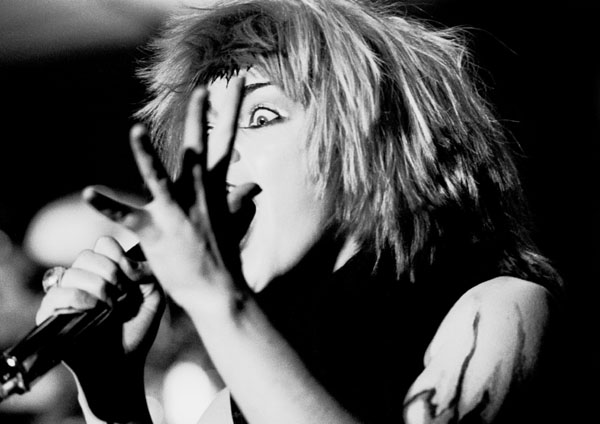
Willcox was considered a part of the new-wave punk movement in the late 1970s and early 1980s

In London, Willcox lived in a place called "Mayhem", a converted British Rail warehouse serving as a studio. It was here the band Toyah recorded their first demos. For the lack of proper bed she slept for a while in a "second-hand" coffin, reportedly used by the French Red Cross to transport victims of fatal accidents. Citing her role in Quadrophenia as a boost to her musical career, with growing audiences Toyah signed to Safari Records, releasing a debut single "Victims of the Riddle", which topped the UK Indie Chart. This was followed by the Sheep Farming in Barnet EP, produced by Steve James and Keith Hale. Initially released in Germany, in 1979 it was re-released as an LP, comprising the original six tracks, "Victims of the Riddle" A and B sides and three tracks that were previously unavailable on vinyl. Willcox's second album, The Blue Meaning, went to no. 40 in the UK Albums Chart in June 1980. By this time, she is reported as announcing she had severed all ties with punk aesthetics.

In January 1981, the live album Toyah! Toyah! Toyah!, recorded at the Lafayette Club in Wolverhampton the previous June, made it to the Top 30, backed up by a TV documentary Toyah. By now the original band had broken up and a new lineup was in place, consisting of Phil Spalding, Nigel Glockler and Adrian Lee, only Joel Bogen and Willcox remaining. 1981 saw Willcox's strengthened presence in the UK chart with hits such as Four from Toyah EP (no. 4, February 1981, including "It's a Mystery"), the third studio album Anthem that went to no. 2 in May 1981, to be later certified platinum, "I Want to Be Free" (no. 8, June 1981), "Thunder in the Mountains" (no. 4, October 1981) and Four More from Toyah EP (no. 14, November 1981). She became one of the first acts to score regularly in the UK Singles Chart with EPs, which were also successful on an international level. At the end of the year Willcox won the Smash Hits' reader's poll in two categories: Best Female Singer and Most Fanciable Female (beating Kim Wilde to the second place). In 1981 she alone, according to Safari, sold in the UK more units than the whole of the Warner Bros. put together.

In 1982, The Changeling album was released, produced by Steve Lillywhite, marking a turn for a more goth-tinged sound, it went up to no. 6 in the UK. The Changeling was followed in the same year by a double live album Warrior Rock: Toyah on Tour. Also in 1982, Willcox appeared in Urgh! A Music War, a British film released in 1982 featuring performances by punk rock, new wave, and post-punk acts, filmed in 1980, in which she performed "Danced". Three more of her singles, "Brave New World", "Ieya" and "Be Proud Be Loud (Be Heard)" charted in the Top 50 of the UK Singles Chart. At the Brit Awards 1982, Willcox was nominated for British Breakthrough Act, and Best Female Solo Artist.

The making of Love Is the Law (1983) was the happiest period of her life, according to Willcox, combining work in the critically acclaimed stage play Trafford Tanzi and the film The Ebony Tower with Laurence Olivier with work on the album. By this time, though, her popularity started to decline: the album reached no. 28 (with singles "Rebel Run" and "The Vow" peaking at no. 24 and no. 50 respectively), and with a 1984 greatest hits compilation, released by K-tel and called confusingly Toyah! Toyah! Toyah! All the Hits, failing to chart.

=== 1984–1990: Solo career and acting work ===
Willcox disbanded her group in 1983, and signed a recording contract with Portrait Records, and, in 1985, released the solo studio album Minx, which contained several cover versions including Alice Cooper's "School's Out", as well as her own hit, "Don't Fall in Love (I Said)".

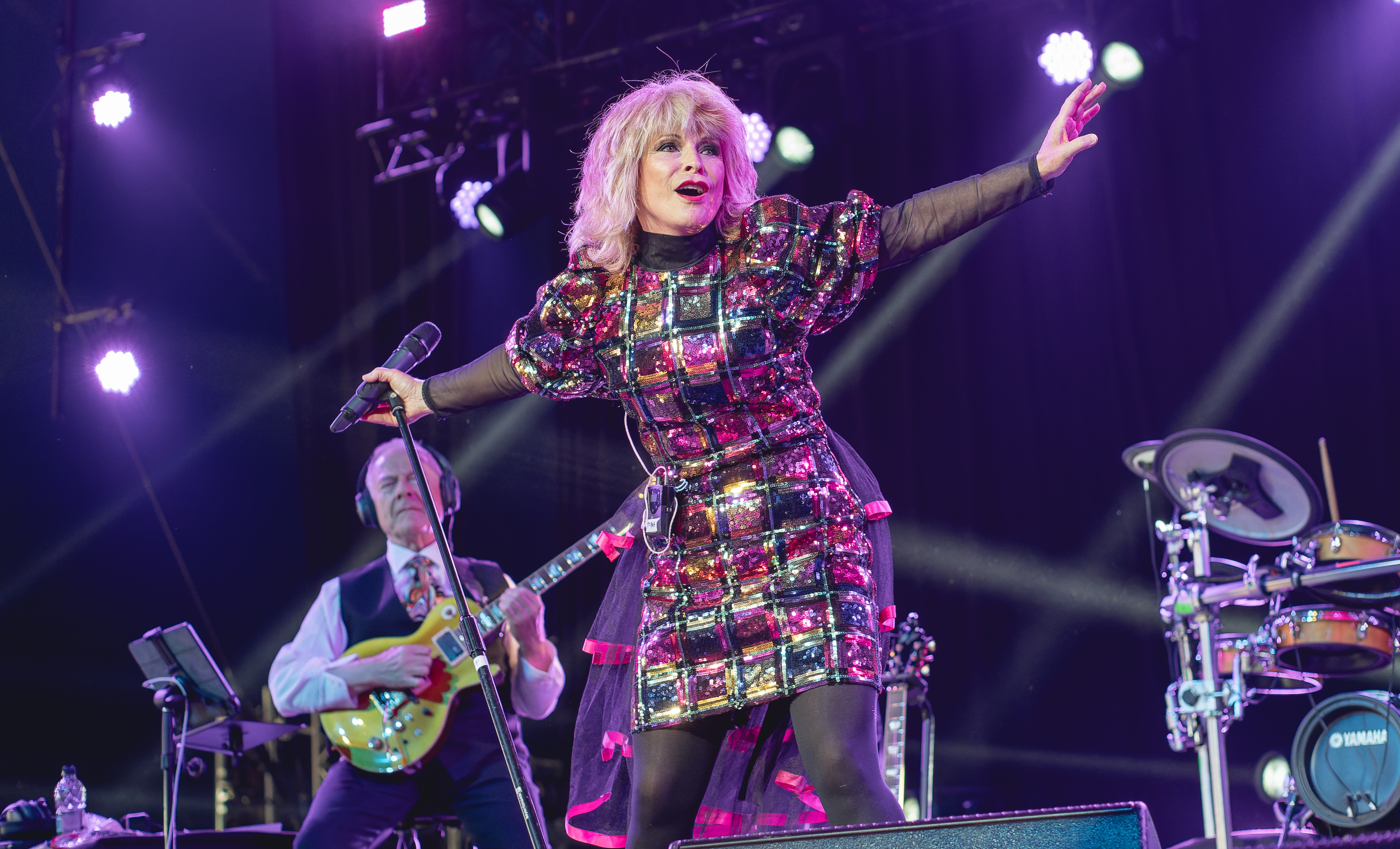
Willcox and her husband Robert Fripp (left) have been married since 1986

Willcox secretly married British guitarist Robert Fripp, founding member of King Crimson, in Witchampton, Dorset on his 40th birthday (16 May 1986). Together they formed a new band, called Fripp Fripp on the initial tours, later changing its name to Sunday All Over the World, which released the critically acclaimed album Kneeling at the Shrine (1991). She referred to Fripp as her 'soulmate'. That same year, she also sang lead vocals on the track "Lion of Symmetry" by Tony Banks of Genesis.

Her next solo studio album Desire (1987) was less successful although the single with her version of "Echo Beach" originally by Martha and the Muffins made it to the Top 50. Then in 1988 Prostitute came out, an album through which Willcox vented her frustrations which started to accumulate as a result of having made the transformation "from all-powerful artist to invisible woman" in the course of just one year of marriage. This experimental concept album, marking a considerable divergence from previous works, was released on E.G. Records. The attitude to Prostitute, according to Willcox, in the UK and the US was radically different: "In the UK, when my management tried to sell it to the music reps, an awful lot got up and walked out of meetings; all male I hasten to add. In America, Billboard magazine said it was the dawning of a new era for me as a producer and that it was an antidote to Madonna. I started to receive mail from professors at eminent universities telling me they played the album at their lectures as an example of the new way of thinking coming from contemporary women." She had many television roles, including series such as Quatermass (1979), Minder (1980), and the movie Quadrophenia. She starred opposite Laurence Olivier in The Ebony Tower (1984), and opposite the Who's Roger Daltrey in Murder: Ultimate Grounds for Divorce (1984). She also appeared on Kavanagh QC. During the late 1980s and 1990s, Willcox forged ahead with a career as a stage performer. Notable credits include Trafford Tanzi (at the Mermaid Theatre, leading role), Cabaret (Sally Bowles), Three Men on a Horse (recipient of the 1987 Olivier Award for Best New Comedy), and the UK tour of Arthur Smith's Live Bed Show. In 1990, she played Costanza in the national tour of Amadeus.

=== 1991–1999: Presenting work and further albums ===
Although she had presented the magazine series Look! Hear! for BBC Birmingham between 1979 and 1981, it was in the 1990s that Willcox's career as a TV presenter took off. She began by presenting arts programmes First Night and Time Off in 1993. By the mid to late 1990s, she could be seen presenting items on shows such as Watchdog:healthcheck, This Morning and The Heaven and Earth Show. She also worked on VH1 for three years, presenting Toyah and Toyah and Chase for the cable music station. Viewers could accompany Willcox to various locations worldwide during her tenure as a reporter on BBC travel shows such as Holiday and Holiday- Fasten Your Seatbelts. Willcox's husband Robert Fripp joined her on her studio album Ophelia's Shadow (1991), which received good reviews. She released three more albums, Take the Leap! (1993), Dreamchild (1994), and Looking Back (1995). In 1996, she had the unique honour of simultaneously hosting both Songs of Praise on the BBC and Good Sex Guide Late on ITV. The same year, Willcox released The Acoustic Album on Aardvark Records, featuring strings from Royal Philharmonic Orchestra and produced by Oliver Davis. In 1999, she took the lead in the children's television series Barmy Aunt Boomerang. She also provided the voices for the children's television programmes Hairy Jeremy, Teletubbies and Brum.

=== 2000–2010: Television appearances and touring ===
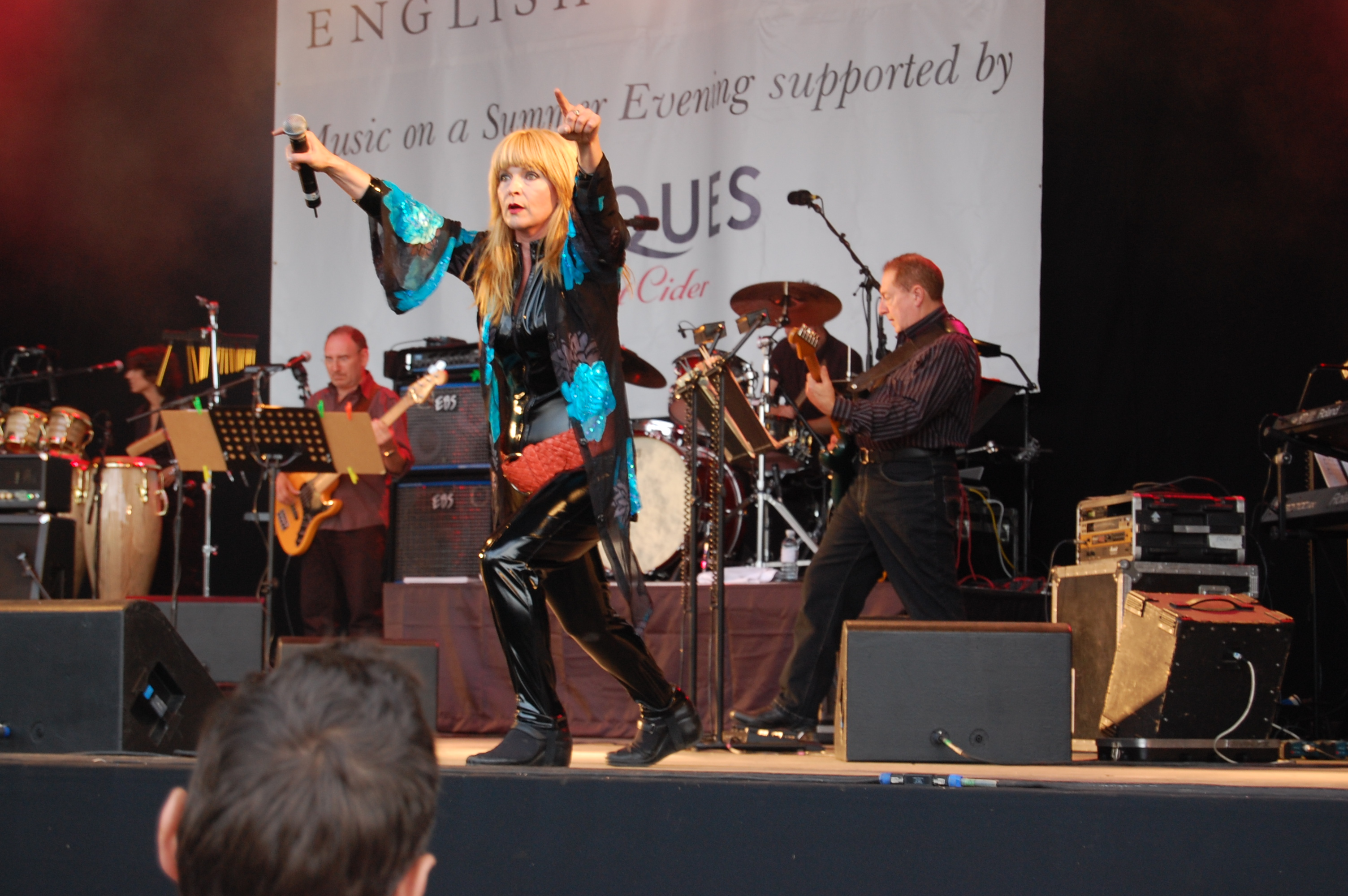
Willcox in 2006

At the turn of the millennium, she continued to work on The Heaven and Earth Show as a newspaper reviewer and also presented a series of Whose Recipe Is It Anyway on the Carlton Food Network and 40 episodes of Beyond Medicine on the Discovery Health Channel. As the noughties progressed, she had stints presenting Head2Head and Destination Lunch on the Overseas Property TV channel, was a newspaper reviewer on Sky News, and hosted various music programmes for Vintage TV.

In 2001, Willcox was awarded an honorary doctorate by the University of Central England in recognition of her achievements in performing arts, media and broadcasting. The 2001 May issue of Q magazine named Willcox number 48 in their top 100 Greatest Women in Music poll, as voted for by readers of the magazine. She returned to music in 2002 with new material for a limited edition Little Tears of Love EP and a one-off preview concert at Ronnie Scott's Jazz Club. The same year she sold out eleven stadium gigs for the Here and Now tour. She continued to perform with her band, releasing a mini-album Velvet Lined Shell in 2003 on her own record label, Vertical Species Records, showcasing a darker, edgier direction. Willcox also appeared on the BBC Radio 4 series The Further Adventures of Sherlock Holmes.

In May 2003, Willcox was a contestant on the second series of the ITV survival reality show I'm a Celebrity...Get Me Out of Here!, and she was fourth to be eliminated. In June 2003, Willcox appeared on stage in London's West End performing the title role of Calamity Jane, which was subsequently nominated for an Evening Standard Award for Best Musical at the Shaftesbury Theatre. In 2004, she performed as part of The Best of the 80s tour in the UK alongside Nick Heyward, Curiosity Killed the Cat and Altered Images. A live DVD followed in 2005, the year that also saw two parts of The Safari Records Singles Collection being issued. In February 2005, Willcox appeared on the fourth and final series of the Living TV programme, I'm Famous and Frightened!. Willcox was a guest vocalist in the anniversary concert of The Rocky Horror Show at the Royal Court Theatre in May 2006. In December 2006, she joined the radio drama series Silver Street on the BBC Asian Network as Siobhan Brady.

Between 2007 and 2008, Willcox had a recurring role as Gail Baxter in Secret Diary of a Call Girl, the mother of the title character played by Billie Piper. In May 2007, she collaborated with Bill Rieflin as the Humans for live dates in Estonia, having been invited by the Estonian president. According to The Northern Echo, that resulted "from reading one of her husband's emails". The invitation was for him to go but he was not keen, so Willcox accepted. The same year, Willcox was a guest presenter on Loose Women. Also in 2007, Willcox signed a new worldwide publishing deal with Zomba Music Group. She continued to write and record solo material with long-term collaborator Simon Darlow. On 29 October 2007, a new single Latex Messiah (Viva la Rebel in You), came out, followed by the In the Court of the Crimson Queen album, written and produced in collaboration with Darlow and released by Willow Recordings Ltd on 15 September 2008. As part of Liverpool's European Capital of Culture year, she performed for the first time ever at the newly opened Liverpool Echo Arena and Conference Centre.

In June 2008, Willcox appeared on Living with the Dead on Living TV to share her experiences of living in her haunted home. In July 2008, Willcox appeared on UK ITV1's This Morning to discuss her role as a vampire in the rock musical Vampires Rock. She has also appeared in shows looking back on popular culture, including the I'm a Celebrity series, and various 'Top 100 favourite' shows. Willcox played Queen Ivannah in Snow White and the Seven Dwarfs at the Lyceum in Sheffield for the 2009 Christmas season. In October 2009, she made a guest appearance in the BBC drama series Casualty. She also played the widow Fantine in Focus on the Family radio theatre's version of Les Misérables. In 2009, a new version of Vampires Rock was created, called Vampires Rock Christmas, and Willcox was back in her role as the Killer Queen, alongside the writer and one of the stars of the show, Steve Steinman. Willcox continued to perform with The Humans, featuring Bill Reiflin, Chris Wong and occasionally husband Robert Fripp. Described as "European experimental meets West Coast American grunge", the Humans recorded their debut studio album We Are the Humans in Seattle in 2008, released in Estonia in May 2009 to coincide with the band's return to play in front of the country's president. The album received a UK digital release in September 2009, along with a single "These Boots Are Made for Walkin'". At the end of the year Willcox came seventh in a BBC series naming the "Queens of British Pop", as voted for by the British public. In 2010 Willcox with the Humans performed at the London's Roundhouse Haiti earthquake fundraiser concert.

=== 2011–present: Anniversary tours, Posh Pop, and later work ===
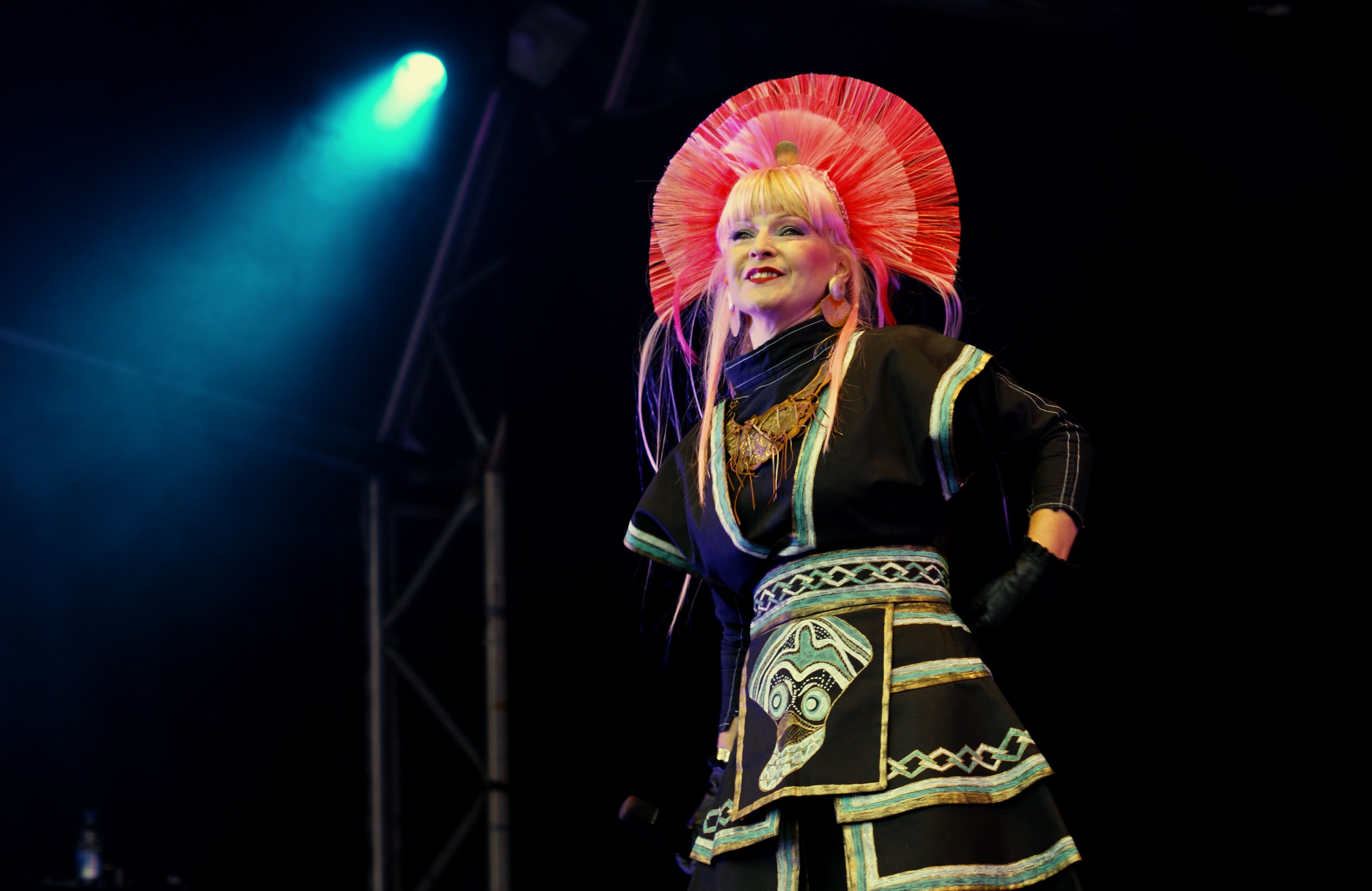
Willcox performing at Manchester Pride in August 2011

On 17 June 2011, Willcox commenced on a special from Sheep Farming to Anthem tour, celebrating the 30th anniversary of her breakthrough hit "It's a Mystery" and the platinum-selling album Anthem, starting at the London's Leicester Square Theatre. The set included selections drawn exclusively from Toyah's first three albums, Sheep Farming in Barnet (1979), The Blue Meaning (1980) and Anthem (1981). Andi Fraggs, a British electronic musician, supported her on chosen dates.

On 14 April 2012, Willcox launched the Changeling Resurrection 2012 tour at the Concorde 2 in Brighton to celebrate the 30th anniversary of her album The Changeling (1982). On 16 July 2012, Willcox performed a concert in her birthplace of Kings Heath, Birmingham, to celebrate being the first artist with a star on the King's Heath Walk of Fame. Andi Fraggs made a surprise appearance, duetting Willcox's 1981 hit single "Thunder in the Mountains". In 2013, Willcox took part in the second series of the ITV diving competition Splash!. She competed in the second heat, and lost the splash-off to Anna Williamson, ultimately becoming the sixth contestant to be eliminated. Willcox released a deluxe edition of her 2008 album In the Court of the Crimson Queen and embarked on the tour revisiting the Love Is the Law (1983)-era material.

Willcox continued to tour both with her full band and also with an acoustic line-up for her "Up Close and Personal" shows. Willcox went on to appear in a number of films, including Aaaaaaaah!, In Extremis, Lies We Tell, Swiperight, Heckle and Invasion Planet Earth. In November 2017, she played Queen Elizabeth II in a theatre adaptation of Derek Jarman's film Jubilee at Manchester Royal Exchange Theatre. This production transferred to the Lyric Hammersmith for a London run in March 2018.

In 2018, Willcox toured her #Toyah60 show, which marked her sixtieth birthday and fortieth year in music. This was accompanied by the release of her Four from Toyah – Birthday Edition EP of new material, which charted highly in the digital chart. She appeared in Celebrity Money for Nothing (2017), she won her heat of Celebrity Mastermind (2018), and appeared on Pointless Celebrities in 2019.

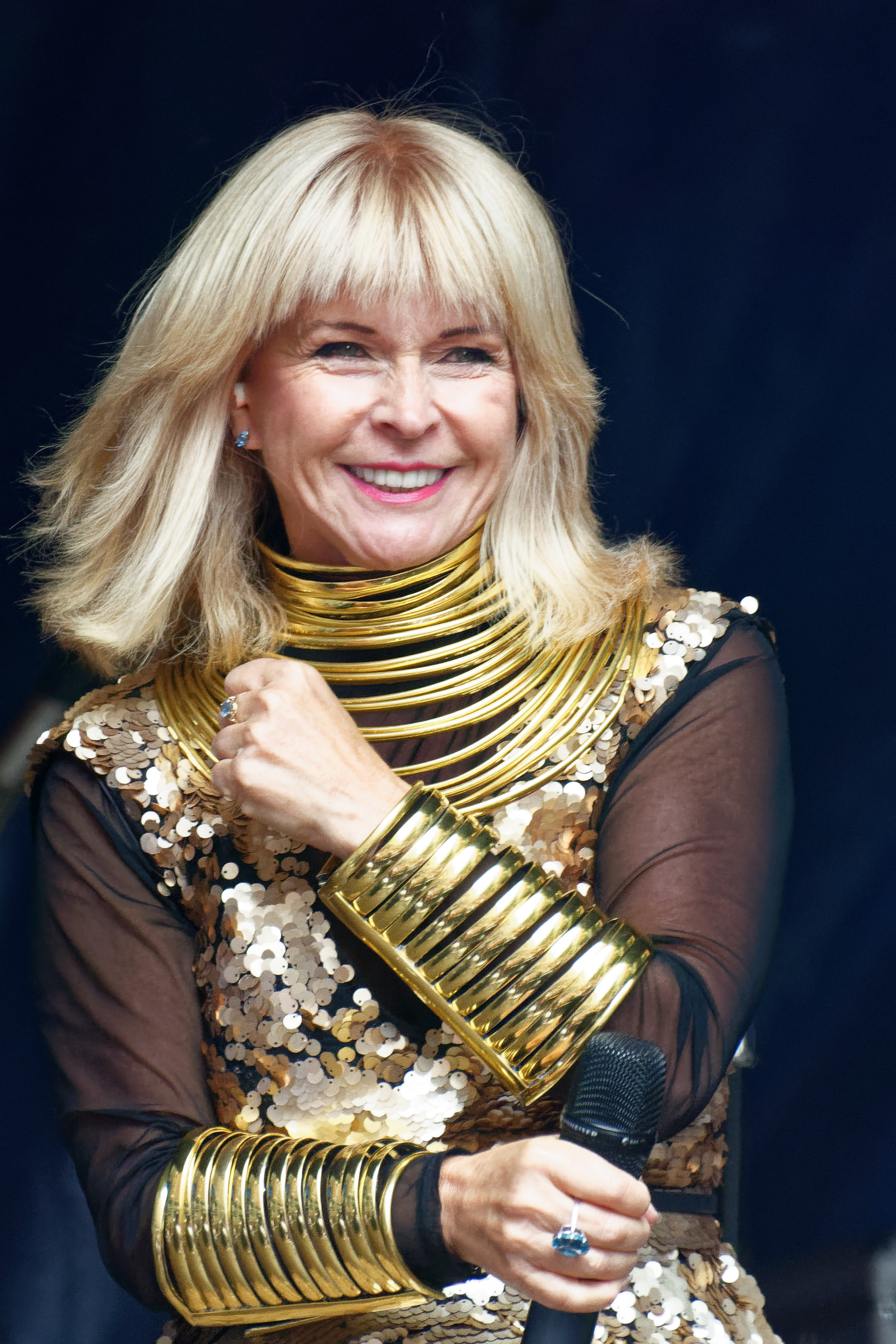
Willcox performing at Nottinghamshire Pride in July 2018

In 2019, Willcox charted at no. 74 in the UK Albums Chart with a re-issue of her 2008 album In the Court of the Crimson Queen. It also peaked at no. 22 on the Official Charts Company's sales chart and no. 7 in the independent chart. This was Willcox' first appearance in the UK Albums Chart since Minx in 1985.

In 2020, the box set Toyah Solo was released, containing six solo albums with bonus material, one Rare, Remixed and Revisited CD, and a DVD with promo videos and interviews. Also in 2020, following their acquisition of the Toyah Safari catalogue, Cherry Red Records began reissuing Willcox's early albums in deluxe 2CD/DVD and vinyl formats. Both Sheep Farming in Barnet and Blue Meaning have been reissued, both appearing in the UK Albums Chart.

During the first UK lockdown of 2020, Willcox began broadcasting from her home across social media and YouTube. On Saturdays she answers fan questions and shares archive performances in Toyah at Home and co-hosts Agony Aunts alongside her husband Robert Fripp. However, it is her Sunday Lunch series with Fripp that has garnered the most fame, frequently going viral and racking up millions of hits on YouTube. She and Fripp started publishing weekly videos in 2021, covering songs such as Slipknot's "Psychosocial", Billy Idol's "Rebel Yell", Rammstein's "Keine Lust", Foo Fighters' "All My Life", Grace Jones' "Slave to the Rhythm" and Rage Against the Machine's "Killing in the Name". On 12 August 2022, they released "Slave to the Rhythm" as a digital download and streaming single. The duo toured the UK in 2023, performing the Sunday Lunch songs in concert.

Willcox released Posh Pop, her first solo studio album since 2008, on CD and vinyl via DMG on 27 August 2021, with the album featuring 10 tracks composed by Willcox and "Slave to the Rhythm" co-writer Simon Darlow. The album reached no. 22 in the chart.

In August 2022, she appeared as herself in two episodes of the BBC Radio 4 series The Archers. Willcox joined Billy Idol on his UK live dates on The Roadside Tour 2022, alongside special guests Killing Joke.

In 2023, she starred in the short film Weightless, which received an award at the New Renaissance Film Festival. In December 2023 Willcox was a celebrity presenter on the BBC One property auction series Homes Under the Hammer.

From September 2024 she was a contestant on the twenty-second series of the BBC competition Strictly Come Dancing and was partnered with professional dancer Neil Jones. She described the show as "the best experience of her life". Willcox and Jones were placed at the bottom of the leader board in the first week, with 12 points. They scored 18 points in week two, yet were placed at the bottom of the leaderboard when the scores from both weeks were combined. The audience vote landed the couple in the bottom two, but they beat Tom Dean and partner Nadiya Bychkova in the dance-off. They scored 15 points in week three and were again at the bottom of the leaderboard. Placed by the audience in the bottom two, they lost the dance-off to Paul Merson and Karen Hauer. In late 2025 she supported Adam Ant on selected dates of his UK Tour.

== Personal life ==
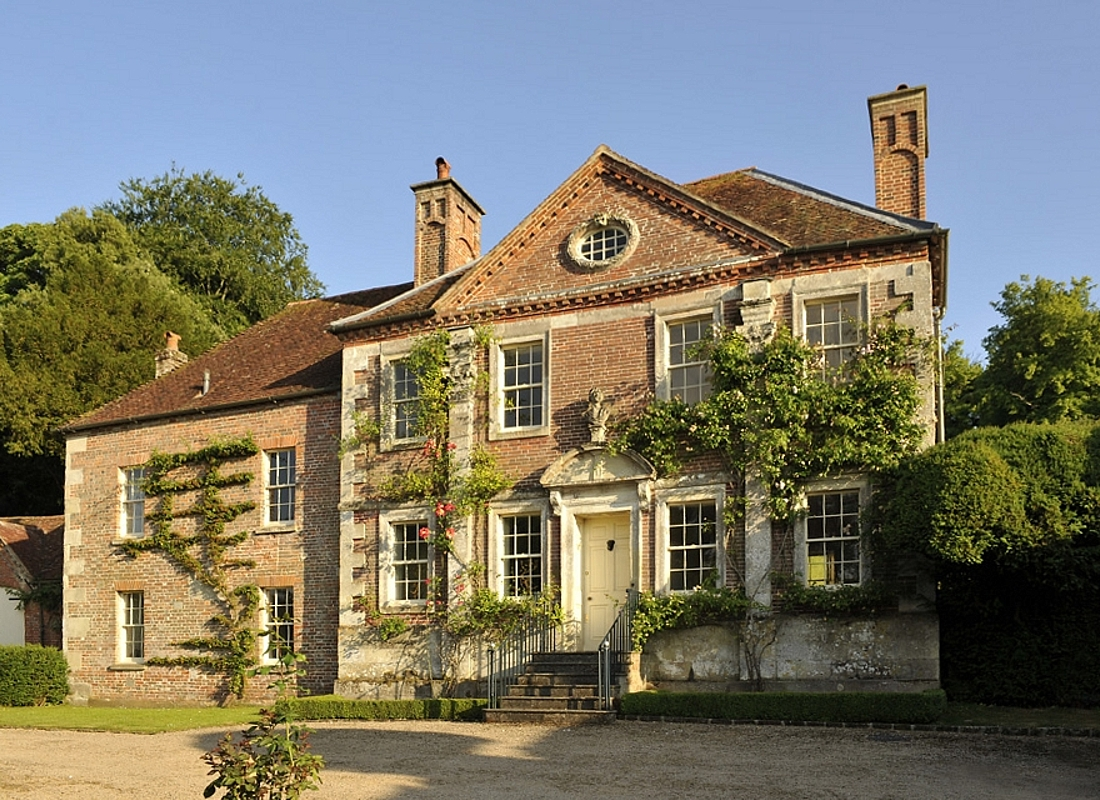
Reddish House, the former home of Toyah Willcox and Robert Fripp, Broad Chalke, Wiltshire

Willcox has been married since 1986 to musician Robert Fripp, founder and guitarist of the progressive rock group King Crimson. The couple have no children; their wills leave their estates to the establishment of a musical educational trust for children. They live in Pershore, Worcestershire.

In 1987 Willcox was invited to make a speech at the Women of the Year ceremony in the presence of Diana, Princess of Wales, expressing her views on the subject of how being disabled (in her case, dyslexia) can be a goad to creativity and inspire a craving for a fuller life experience.

In 2002 she became a prominent opponent of planned accommodation centres for asylum seekers near the Worcestershire village of Throckmorton, protesting together with more than one thousand villagers.

In November 2007 Willcox took on the role of sponsoring the Black Country Urban Park for the People's £50 million Big Lottery Fund. In April 2008, she took part in the Great Walk to Beijing alongside other celebrities, to raise money for Olivia Newton-John's cancer charity.

In 2009 she had corrective surgery when she had a hip replacement and one of her legs shortened.

== Discography ==
with Toyah

- Sheep Farming in Barnet (1979)
- The Blue Meaning (1980)
- Anthem (1981)
- The Changeling (1982)
- Love Is the Law (1983)

Solo album

- Minx (1985)
- Desire (1987)
- Prostitute (1988)
- Ophelia's Shadow (1991)
- Take the Leap! (1993)
- Dreamchild (1994)
- Looking Back (1995)
- The Acoustic Album (1996)
- Velvet Lined Shell (2003)
- In the Court of the Crimson Queen (2008)
- Posh Pop (2021)

== Tours ==
- The Resurrection Tour (1979)
- Sheep Farming in Barnet Tour (1979)
- Bird in Flight Tour (1980)
- Ieya Tour (1980)
- College Tour (1981)
- Anthem Tour (1981)
- Good Morning Universe: European Tour (1981)
- Changeling Tour (1982)
- The Warrior Rock Tour (1982)
- Rebel Run Tour (1983)
- Fripp Fripp Tour (1988)
- Sunday All Over the World Tour (1989)
- Take the Leap! Tour (1993)
- Leap 2 Dream Tour (1994)
- Acoustic Dreamchild Tour (1994)
- Has God Ceased 2 Dream You? Tour (1994)
- Here and Now Tour (2002)
- Best of the 80s Tour (2004)
- The Hitmakers Tour (2006)
- From Sheep Farming to Anthem: Classics Revisited Tour (2010)
- The Changeling Resurrection Tour (2012)
- The Changeling Resurrection II (2012)
- Love Is the Law & More Tour (2013)
- Crimson Queen/Greatest Hits... Live! (2014)
- Acoustic, Up Close & Personal (2014)
- North American Tour with the Humans (2014)
- Songs From The Intergalactic Ranch House... and Beyond! (2014)
- Loud, Proud & Electric Tour (2015)
- 80s Invasion Tour (2017)
- #Toyah60 Tour (2018)
- Thunder in the Highlands Scottish Tour (2019)
- Posh Pop Tour (2021–2022)
- Electric Ladies with Lene Lovich (2022)
- Sunday Lunch with Robert Fripp (2023)
- supporting Adam Ant (2025)

== Filmography ==
Film
Year	Title	Role	Notes
1978	Jubilee	Mad	Feature film
1979	The Corn Is Green	Bessie Watty	Feature film
1979	Quadrophenia	Monkey	Feature film
1979	The Tempest	Miranda	Feature film
1980	Dr. Jekyll and Mr. Hyde	Janet	Television film
1980	Toyah	Herself	Television film
1981	Urgh! A Music War	Herself	Concert film
1984	Murder: Ultimate Grounds for Divorce	Valerie Cunningham	Feature film
1984	The Ebony Tower	Anne, 'The Freak'	Feature film
1984	Lorca and the Outlaws	Singer at Club	Feature film (uncredited role)
1986	The Disputation	Consuelo	Television film
1990	The Tale of Little Pig Robinson	Ship's Cat	Television film
1990	Midnight Breaks	Elize	Feature film
1993	Anchoress	Pauline Carpenter	Feature film
1993	Tomorrow Calling	Dialta Downes	Short film
1999	Julie and the Cadillacs	Barbara Gifford	Feature film
1999	The Most Fertile Man in Ireland	Dr. Johnson	Feature film
2011	The Power of Three	Michelle	Feature film
2013	3 Sides of the Coin	Jessica	Short film
2013	Dun Punkin: Ep.1 – 'Boys Will Be Boys'	Nurse Willcox	Short film
2015	Aaaaaaaah!	Barabara	Feature film
2017	Last Laugh	Pam Allan	Feature film
2017	Lies We Tell	Lydia	Feature film
2017	In Extremis	Woman	Feature film
2017	The Apple Picker	Narrator	Feature film
2018	Hound	Alice Meynell	Feature film
2019	Invasion Planet Earth	Claire Dove	Feature film
2020	Doll House	Layla	Feature film
2020	To Be Someone	Bunny	Feature film
2020	Geminus	Juliet	Short film
2020	Heckle	Julie Johnson	Feature film
2020	SwipeRight	Dr. Bennett	Feature film
2021	Give Them Wings	Alice Hodgson	Feature film
2021	Ghosts of Borley Rectory	Estelle Roberts	Feature film
2024	Weightless	Maureen	Short film
Television
Year	Title	Role	Notes
1976	Second City Firsts	Sue	Episode: "Glitter"
1977	Three Piece Suite	Buzz	Episode: "This Situation"
1978	Premiere	Fran	Episode: "One of These Nights I'm Gonna Get an Early Day"
1979	The Quatermass Conclusion	Sal	3 episodes
1980	Shoestring	Toola	Episode: "Find the Lady"
1980	A Question of Guilt	Alice Fulcher	5 episodes
1980	Minder	Kate	Episode: "All Mod Cons"
1980	Friday Night, Saturday Morning	Herself	Host
1980–1981, 2018	The Old Grey Whistle Test	Herself	Guest; 3 episodes
1981	Cheggers Plays Pop	Herself	Guest
1981	Ask Aspel	Herself	Guest
1981	Toyah at the Rainbow	Herself	Performer
1981–1982	Tiswas	Herself	5 episodes
1982	ITV Playhouse	Sheryl	Episode: "Little Girls Don't"
1982	Animal Magic	Herself	Guest
1982	Musikladen	Herself	Guest
1982	Dear Heart	Super Advice Person	6 episodes
1982	Haute Tension	Herself	Episode: "Kraftwerk"
1981–1982	Get Set for Summer	Herself	2 episodes
1981–1983	Top of the Pops	Herself	8 episodes
1981–1984, 1994	Pop Quiz	Herself	Guest; 5 episodes
1982	Multi-Coloured Swap Shop	Herself	Guest
1982	Crackerjack!	Herself	Guest
1982	Children in Need	Herself	Guest
1982	Three of a Kind	Herself	Guest
1982	Tales of the Unexpected	Myra "Marigold"	Episode: "Blue Marigold"
1982, 1985	The Kenny Everett Television Show	Herself	Guest; 2 episodes
1982–1983	The Saturday Show	Herself	Guest
1983	The Russell Harty Show	Herself	Guest
1983	The Get Set Picture Show	Herself	Guest
1983	Formal Eins	Herself	Guest
1983	Saturday Superstore	Herself	Guest
1984	Pop Quiz – Christmas Special	Herself	1 episode
1983–1986	Did You See...?	Herself	2 episodes
1983–1993	Pebble Mill at One	Herself	4 episodes
1985	Function Room	Liz Bristowe	Episode: "Movie Queen"
1985	Pob	Herself	Guest
1985	No. 73	Herself	1 episode
1985	The Saturday Picture Show	Herself	1 episode
1985–1988	Wogan	Herself	4 episodes
1987	The Grand Knockout Tournament	Herself	Guest
1987	It's Wicked!	Herself	Guest
1987	The Grand Knockout Tournament	Herself	Guest
1988	French and Saunders	Herself	Guest
1988	Fax!	Herself	Guest
1988	'Treasure Hunt	Herself	Guest
1988	Daytime Live	Herself	Guest presenter
1988	It's a Knockout	Herself	Guest
1988	Boudicca	Herself	1 episode
1988	Driving Force '88: Snow Special	Herself	Guest
1990	Cluedo	Miss Scarlett	Episode: "Christmas Past, Christmas Present"
1990	Tomorrow's World	Herself	Guest
1990	The Great Picture Chase	Herself	Guest
1991–1994	Brum	Narrator	2 series
1991	Clean Slate	Herself	Guest
1991	Arena	Herself	Guest
1991	The Media Show	Herself	Guest
1991	That's Showbusiness	Herself	2 episodes
1992	Hairy Jeremy	Narrator	1 series
1992	First Night on TV	Herself	Presenter
1993	Maigret	Gigi	Episode: "Maigret and the Hotel Majestic"
1993	Entertainment UK	Herself	Guest
1993	Doctor Who: Thirty Years in the TARDIS	Herself	Documentary
1994	The Ink Thief	Dog	1 series
1995	Kavanagh QC	Deborah Drake	Episode: "A Family Affair"
1995	Shooting Gallery	—N/a	Episode: "Future Dread"
1995	A Night with Derek	Herself	Guest
1995	Pot of Gold	Herself	Guest/ judge
1995	The Magic & Mystery Show	Herself	Guest
1995	A Night with Derek	Herself	Guest
1996	The Good Sex Guide Late	Herself	Presenter
1996	Watchdog Healthcheck	Herself	1 episode
1996–1998	Holiday	Herself	Guest presenter; 8 episodes
1996–2000	This Is Your Life	Herself	3 episodes
1997	Presenting... Toyah on VH1	Herself	Guest
1997	Night Fever	Herself	Guest
1997	Light Lunch	Herself	Guest
1998	Water Work	Herself	Reporter
1998	Computers Don't Bite: The Beginner's Guide	Herself	Guest presenter; 8 episodes
1997–1998	Holiday: Fasten Your Seatbelt	Guest presenter	2 episodes
1997–2001	Teletubbies	Narrator	4 series
1997–2002	Songs of Praise	Herself	Guest/Presenter; 5 episodes
1998	Boys from the Black Country – The Slade Story	Herself	Presenter
1998	My Favourite Hymns	Herself	Guest
1998	Not a Lot of People Know That	Herself	Guest
1998–2005	Never Mind the Buzzcocks	Herself	Guest; 5 episodes
1998–2014	Through the Keyhole	Herself	Guest; 6 episodes
1998–1999	Countdown	Herself	Dictionary corner; 2 episodes
1999	Man O Man	Herself	Guest
1999	Fully Booked	Herself	Guest
1999	It's Slade	Herself	Guest
1999	Barmy Aunt Boomerang	Aunt Boomerang	2 series
1999–2000	Heaven and Earth with Gloria Hunniford	Herself	Guest/Presenter; 2 episodes
2000	Doctors	Marcy Preston	Episode: Mum's the Word
2000	It's Anybody's Guess!	Herself	Guess
2000	Holiday on a Shoestring	Herself	Reporter
2000	Live Talk	Herself	Guest
2000	Wipeout	Herself	Guest
2000	Quadrophenia: Featurette	Herself	Guest
2001	Banzai	Herself	Guest
2001	Trigger Happy TV	Herself	Guest
2001	It's Your Funeral	Herself	Guest
2001	Celebrity Ready Steady Cook	Herself	Guest
2001	Jumpers for Goalposts	Herself	Guest
2001	Top Ten	Herself	Guest
2001	Liquid News	Herself	Guest
2001	Bad Hair Days	Herself	Guest
2001	Ceri Dupree Unfrocked	Herself	Guest
2001	I Love Christmas	Herself	Guest
2001	I Love the '80s	Herself	6 episodes
2002	Mr Bean: The Animated Series	Additional voices	2 episodes
2002	Open House Panto Special	Herself	Guest
2002	V Graham Norton	Herself	Guest
2002	You Askin'? I'm Dancin'	Herself	Guest
2003	Open House with Gloria Hunniford	Herself	Guest
2003	25 Years of Smash Hits	Herself	Documentary
2003	GMTV	Herself	Guest
2003	I'm a Celebrity...Get Me Out of Here!	Herself	Contestant; series 2
2003	Jubilee: A Time Less Golden	Herself	Documentary
2003	Weakest Link	Herself	Contestant
2003	Stars in Their Eyes	Herself	Contestant (as Patti Smith)
2003	EastEnders Revealed	Herself	Guest
2003	The Pilot Show	Herself	Guest
2003	Rock Legends	Herself	Documentary
2003–2023	Loose Women	Herself	Guest; 7 episodes
2003	The 100 Greatest Musicals	Herself	Documentary
2004, 2014	The Wright Stuff	Herself	Guest; 2 episodes
2004, 2011, 2021	This Morning	Herself	Guest; 3 episodes
2004	Beat the Nation	Herself	Guest
2004	Hell's Kitchen	Herself	Guest
2004	Simply the Best	Herself	Guest
2004	The 100 Greatest Christmas Moments	Herself	Documentary
2004	Britain's Favourite Comedian	Herself	Documentary
2005	I'm Famous and Frightened!	Herself	Contestant; series 4
2005	The Late Edition	Herself	Guest
2005	Queen Mania: The Show Must Go On	Herself	Guest
2005	Queen Mania	Herself	Guest
2005	Tubridy Tonight	Herself	Guest
2005	House Doctor: We Love You	Herself	Guest
2005	Have I Been Here Before?	Herself	Guest
2005	The Big Call	Herself	Guest
2005	Britain's Finest	Herself	Episode: "Actors"
2005	Are You Younger Than You Think?	Herself	Documentary
2005	The Wonderful World of Roald Dahl	Herself	Documentary
2005	Shameful Secrets of the 70s	Herself	Documentary
2005	Shameful Secrets of the 80s	Herself	Documentary
2005	Avenue of the Stars: 50 Years of ITV	Herself	Audience member
2005	Sunday Morning	Herself	Guest
2005	A Brush with Fame	Herself	Guest
2005	Girls and Boys: Sex and British Pop	Herself	Documentary
2005	Rajan and His Evil Hypnotists	Herself	Guest
2006	Now That's Embarrassing: The 80's	Herself	Documentary
2006	In Your Dreams	Herself	Guest
2006	A Way of Life: Making Quadrophenia	Herself	Documentary
2006	Richard & Judy	Guest	2 episodes
2006	The Story of Light Entertainment	Herself	Episode: "Pop and Easy Listening"
2006	Celebrity MasterChef	Herself	Contestant; series 1
2006	Ballet Hell	Herself	Guest
2006	Proud Parents	Herself	Documentary
2007–2008	Secret Diary of a Call Girl	Gail Baxter	Recurring role
2007	Backkom-eui Mug-jan Yeo-haeng	—N/a	Voice role
2007	Tiswas Reunited	Herself	Guest
2007	Secrets of Celebrity Stars in Their Eyes	Herself	Documentary
2007	The Podge and Rodge Show	Herself	Guest
2007	BBC Breakfast	Herself	Guest
2008	In Your Dreams	Herself	Guest
2008	Living with the Dead	Herself	Guest
2008, 2018	Celebrity Mastermind	Herself	Contestant; 2 episodes
2008	The Worlds of Fantasy	Herself	Episode: "The Epic Imagination"
2008	Top 50 Showbiz Comebacks	Herself	Documentary
2008	Daily Cooks Challenge	Herself	Guest
2008	Cash in the Celebrity Attic	Herself	Guest
2008	What Are You Like?	Herself	Guest; 10 episodes
2008	Ready Steady Cook	Herself	Celebrity Christmas Special
2009	FM	Herself	Guest
2009	Psychic Therapy	Herself	Guest
2009	Celeb Experiences	Herself	Guest
2009	Celebrity Brides Unveiled	Herself	Guest
2009	Celebrity Life Skills	Herself	Guest
2009	The Alan Titchmarsh Show	Herself	Guest
2009	Ant & Dec's Saturday Night Takeaway	Herself	Guest
2009	The Truth About Beauty	Herself	Guest; 1 episode
2009	The One Show	Herself	Guest; 1 episode
2009	Casualty	Hazel Tillier	Episode: "Comfort Zone"
2009	Hole in the Wall	Herself	Guest
2010	Gayle Tuesday: The Comeback	Herself	Documentary
2010	Greatest Christmas TV Moments	Herself	Documentary
2010	Greatest Christmas TV Ads	Herself	Documentary
2011	Let's Dance for Sport Relief	Herself	Contestant; 2 episodes
2011	Top of the Pops: The Story of 1976	Herself	Documentary
2011	Olivia Lee: Dirty, Sexy Funny	Herself	Guest
2011	Celebrity Ghost Stories	Herself	Guest
2011	Celebrity Antiques Road Trip	Herself	Guest
2011	Greatest Ever Carry On Films	Herself	Documentary
2011–2013	Daybreak	Herself	Guest; 3 episodes
2012	The Women of Doctor Who	Herself	TV movie documentary
2012	The Timey-Wimey of Doctor Who	Herself	TV mini-series documentary
2012	The Destinations of Doctor Who	Herself	TV movie documentary
2012–2021	Pointless Celebrities	Herself	Contestant; 5 episodes
2013	All Star Mr & Mrs	Herself	Contestant
2013	The Big Fat Quiz of the 80s	Herself	Guest
2014	Splash!	Herself	Contestant; series 2
2014	Our Gay Wedding: The Musical	Herself	Documentary
2014	The Greatest 80s Movies	Herself	Documentary
2014	Who's Doing the Dishes?	Herself	Guest
2014–2016	Lorraine	Herself	Guest; 3 episodes
2015	Doctors	Bill	Episode: "Afternoon of the Living Dead"
2015	Sounds of the 80s	Herself	Documentary
2015	80's: The Best of Bad TV	Herself	Documentary
2015	The Nation's Favourite 80's Number One	Herself	Documentary
2015	The 90s: The Best of Bad TV	Herself	Documentary
2015	Blink	Herself	Contestant
2015	Most Shocking Moments in Pop 2	Herself	Documentary
2015	Most Shocking Christmas TV Moments	Herself	Documentary
2016	Trailblazers Of	Herself	2 episodes
2016	When Television Goes Horribly Wrong	Herself	Documentary
2016	The Chase: Celebrity Special	Herself	Contestant
2016	Pop Quiz: The Comeback	Herself	Guest
2017	Celebrity Money for Nothing	Herself	Contestant
2018	When Award Shows Go Horribly Wrong	Herself	Documentary
2018	Ooh You Are Awful: TV We Used to Love	Herself	Documentary
2018	Celebrity Eggheads	Herself	Contestant
2018–2019	Jeremy Vine	Herself	Guest; 3 episodes
2019	Paxman on the Queen's Children	Herself	Guest
2019	Quadrophenia Reunited: 40 Years On	Herself	Guest
2019	Quadrophenia: Our Generation	Herself	Documentary
2019	Britain's Favourite Christmas Carol	Herself	Documentary
2020	The Lock Inn Pub Quiz	Herself	Contestant
2020	When Pop Stars Go Horribly Wrong	Herself	Documentary
2020	Celebrity Catchphrase	Herself	Contestant
2021	Afterlife	Herself	Guest
2021	Tipping Point: Lucky Stars	Herself	Contestant
2021	Britain's Biggest 80s Hits	Herself	Talking head
2021	Britain's Biggest 70s Hits	Herself	Talking head
2022	Fame in the Family	Herself	Guest
2021	The Archers	Herself	2 episodes
2021	Britain's Favourite 90s Songs	Herself	Documentary
2021	Midlands Today	Herself	Guest
2022	Britain's Favourite Dessert	Herself	Documentary
2022	Celebrity Help! My House Is Haunted	Herself	Guest
2022	DNA Diners	Herself	Guest
2022	Greatest 80s Pop Videos	Herself	4 episodes
2022	The Great Garden Revolution	Herself	Guest
2022	Heatwave: Summer of '76	Herself	Documentary
2022	Moneybags	Herself	Contestant
2022	The Cotswolds and Beyond with Pam Ayres	Herself	Guest
2023	Call Me Kate	Herself	Documentary
2023	Portrait Artist of the Year	Herself	Contestant
2023	Three Little Words	Herself	Guest
2023	Britain's Biggest Flood: Summer 2007	Herself	Guest
2023	Richard Osman's House of Games	Herself	Contestant
2023	Strictly Come Dancing: It Takes Two	Herself	Guest
2024	The Weakest Link	Herself	Contestant
2024	Strictly Come Dancing	Herself	Contestant; series 22
2024, 2025	Love Your Weekend with Alan Titchmarsh	Herself	Guest; 2 episodes
2024	Lives Well Lived	Herself	Guest; 2 episodes
2025	The Hit List	Herself	Contestant; 1 episode
2025	Jimmy and Shivi's Farmhouse Breakfast	Herself	Guest; 1 episode
2025	The Big Drought of 1975	Herself	Documentary
2026	Celebrity Lingo	Herself	Guest; 1 episode
2026	Celebrity Bridge of Lies	Herself	Guest; 1 episode

== Books ==
- 2000: Living Out Loud, Hodder & Stoughton Ltd, ISBN 978-0340745700
- 2005: Diary of a Facelift, Michael O'Mara Books Ltd, ISBN 978-1843171355

== Sources ==
=== General ===
- Evans, Gayna (July 1982). Toyah. Proteus. ISBN 0-86276-102-6.
- Gilligan, Bev & Driscol, Margarette (1982). The Official Toyah Special. Grandreams Ltd. ISBN 0-86227-071-5.
- West, Mike (April 1982). Toyah. Omnibus Press. ISBN 0-7119-0062-0.
