= Richard fitz Samson =

12th-century bishop of Bayeux, Duchy of Normandy

Richard fitz Samson, also known as Richard of Dover (French: Richard de Douvres), was the bishop of Bayeux (as Richard II) at the beginning of the 12th century.

== Family ==
Richard was the son of Samson of Worcester, Bishop of Worcester (1096-1112), and nephew of Thomas of Bayeux, Archbishop of York (1070-1100). He was also the uncle of Richard de Gloucester, his successor in the bishopric of Bayeux.

== Biography ==
Richard was grand vicar of Odo of Bayeux (brother of William the Conqueror). Richard then succeeded Turold de Brémoy in the bishopric of Bayeux in 1107, appointed by King Henry I. He was consecrated Bishop of Bayeux in October 1119 during the Council of Reims by Pope Calixtus II. While he already signed charters as bishop, nothing explains the delay in his consecration.

He presided in 1128 over a provincial council attended by the Archbishop of Rouen and his suffragans the bishops of Lisieux, Avranches, Coutances and Sées, Geoffroy de Lèves, bishop of Chartres, Josselin de Vierzy, bishop of Soissons, as well as many abbots and King Henry I.

On 14 September 1130 he dedicated Hugh of Amiens as archbishop of Rouen.

He also attended the coronation of King Louis VII of France in Reims on 25 October 1131.

Richard gave the bishopric the barony of Dover, of which he was lord. He was also the founder of the Priory of Le Plessis-Grimoult.

He died in Easter week of 1133 and was buried in Bayeux Cathedral.
