= François II de Nesmond =

French bishop

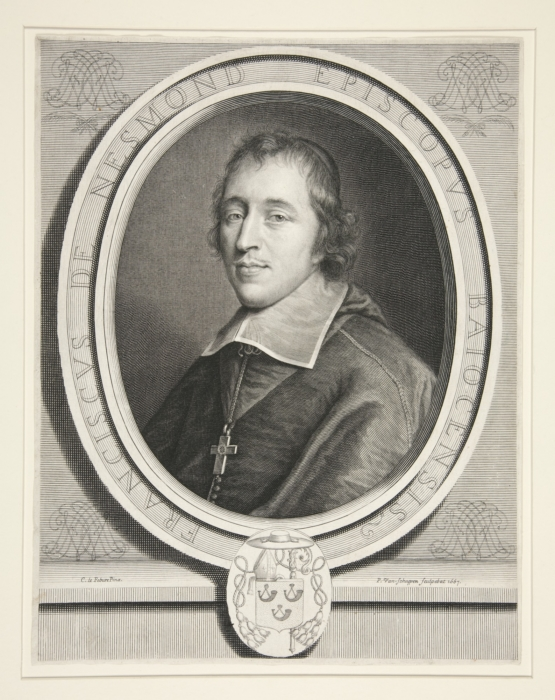
Portrait of François II de Nesmond

François II de Nesmond (1629–1715) was a French bishop of Bayeux, noted for his reformist principles drawing on the Counter-Reformation as laid down by the Council of Trent.

== Life ==
He was bishop in Bayeux from 1661 for the rest of his life. In 1693 he founded the seminary there. In Bayeux Cathedral he undertook construction from 1700 of a rood screen, and a central tower by Jacques Moussard. He also founded in 1700 the chapel of the Augustinians.

He condemned the writings of the theologian Pierre Cally at the University of Caen as tending to heresy.
