= Jean-Claude Boulanger =

French prelate

His Excellency Jean-Claude Boulanger
- Bishop of Bayeux-Lisieux
- Church: Roman Catholic Church
- See: Diocese of Bayeux
- Installed: 12 March 2010
- Term ended: 27 June 2020
- Predecessor: Pierre Pican
- Successor: Jacques Habert

Orders
- Ordination: 25 June 1972
- Consecration: 2 December 2001 by Jean-Paul Jaeger

Personal details
- Born: 1 March 1945 (age 81) Journy, Pas-de-Calais, France
- Motto: Confidite nolite timere
- Coat of arms

Jean-Claude Ézechiel Jean-Baptiste Boulanger (born 1 March 1945) is a French prelate of the Catholic Church. He was Bishop of Bayeux from 2010 to 2020. He was previously Coadjutor Bishop and Bishop of Séez from 2001 to 2010.

== Biography ==
Jean-Claude Boulanger was born in 1945 in Journy (Pas-de-Calais). He studied at the diocesan seminary of Arras and Lille. He was ordained a priest of the Diocese of Arras on 25 June 1972. He earned a doctorate in theology at the Institute Catholique in Paris in 1976. From 1972 to 1979 he worked in Arras as Vicar in the pastoral sector of St. Pol-sur-Ternoise and chaplain for the students and young people of the region. From 1979 to 1987 he was chaplain of the rural colleges of the Boulogne-Calais coast. In 1987 he became head of the Les Tourelles reception house in Condette. Within his diocese he was a member of the Presbyteral Council, Diocesan Delegate for Formation and Communication, and Chaplain of the Mouvement des Cadres, Techniciens, Ingénieurs et Dirigeants Chrétiens.

On 16 October 2001, Pope John Paul II named him Coadjutor Bishop of Séez. He received his episcopal consecration on 2 December 2001.

He succeeded as Bishop of Sées on 25 April 2002, when Pope John Paul accepted the resignation of his predecessor, Yves-Marie Dubigeon.

On 12 March 2010, Pope Benedict XVI appointed him Bishop of Bayeux.

Pope Francis accepted his resignation on 27 June 2020.

== See also ==
- Catholic Church in France
- List of the Roman Catholic dioceses of France

Catholic Church titles
Preceded by Pierre Pican	Bishop of Bayeux; 2010–2020	Succeeded by Jacques Habert
