= Pierre Pican =

French prelate

- Bishop of Bayeux
- Church: Roman Catholic Church
- See: Diocese of Bayeux
- In office: 1988–2010
- Predecessor: Jean Badré
- Successor: Jean-Claude Boulanger

Orders
- Ordination: 24 April 1966
- Consecration: 17 April 1988 by Jean Badré

Personal details
- Born: 27 February 1935 Granville, France
- Died: 23 July 2018 (aged 83) Paris, France

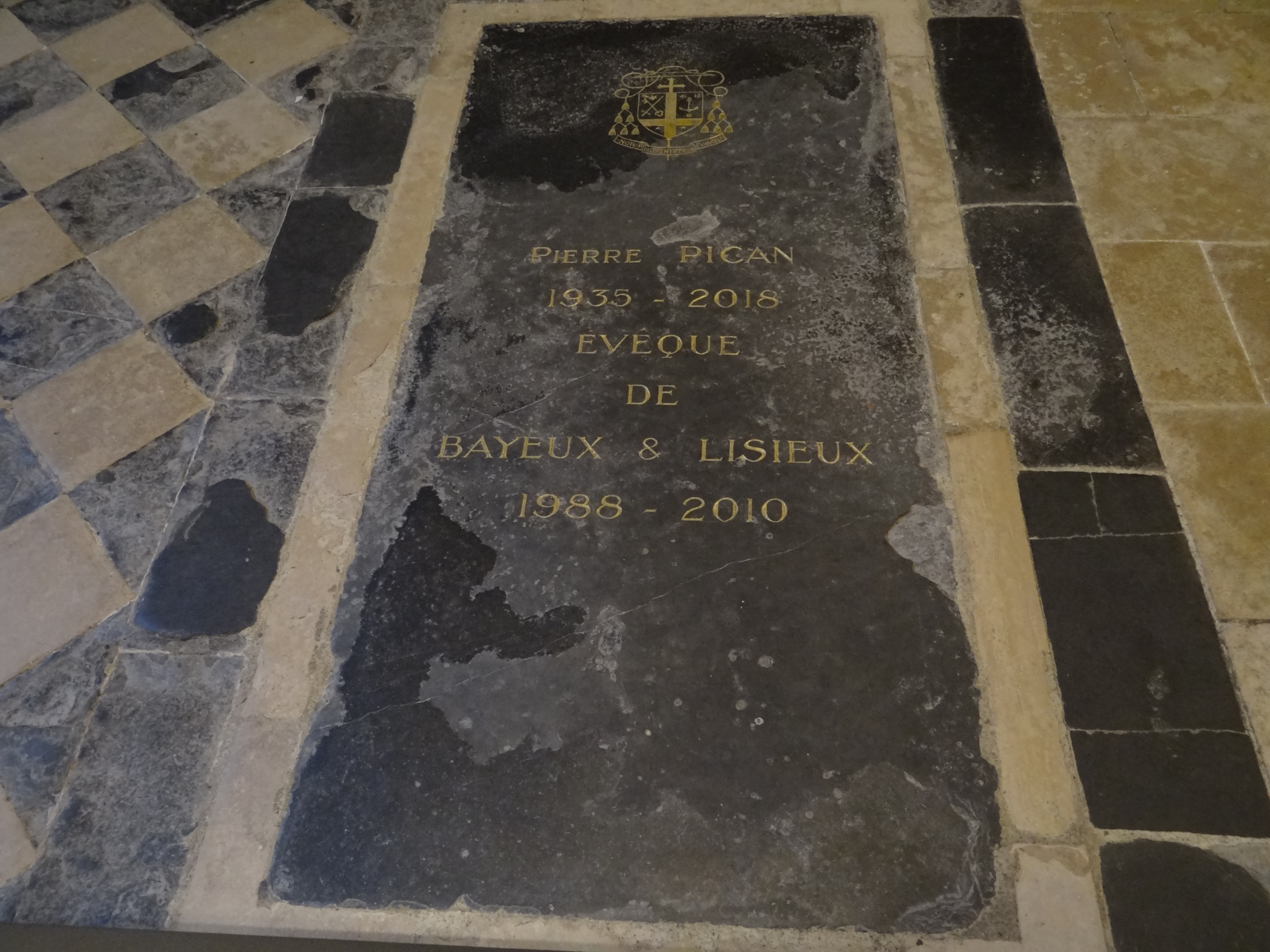
Memorial plaque at tomb of Pierre Auguste Gratien Pican S.D.B. (27 February 1935 – 23 July 2018), Bishop of Bayeux from 1988 to 2010.

Pierre Auguste Gratien Pican S.D.B. (27 February 1935 – 23 July 2018) was a French prelate of the Catholic Church who served as Bishop of Bayeux from 1988 to 2010. In 2001, he was given a three-month suspended sentence for failing to notify civil authorities of charges of sexual abuse of a minor made against one of his priests, the first criminal conviction of a French bishop since the Revolution. (Note: His was the first trial of a French bishop since 1841.)

== Biography ==
Pican was born in Granville on 27 February 1935. He studied ancient languages and literature before joining the Salesians of Don Bosco. He continued his education at the seminary in Dormans and spent his years as a scholastic in Lyon. He took his final vows as a Salesian in 1963. He was ordained a priest on 24 April 1966. He was a school chaplain in Caen for two years and then from 1968 to 1971 led a parish as well as a French-Lebanese school in Beirut, followed by directorship of a technical school. He was provincial superior of the Salesians from 1975 to 1981.

Pope John Paul II named Pican Coadjutor Bishop of Bayeux on 17 April 1988. He received his episcopal consecration on 17 April, and became bishop there on 19 November.

He was a member of the Pontifical Council for the Laity.

On 4 September 2001, Pican was sentenced to three months in prison for having failed to report Father Rene Bissey, a parish pastor in his diocese, to authorities after a woman charged in December 1996 that the priest had molested her teenage son. The priest had admitted his guilt and confessed to abusing others, and in January 1997 Pican had assigned him to therapy without changing his parish assignment. Pican's sentence was suspended. Pican's attorney said "This is the first time a bishop is condemned since the French Revolution. No boy presented in the civil hearing of the trial suffered any consequence because of Bishop Pican's silence." Pican said he had not assessed the seriousness of Bissey's actions properly, but that when they first spoke in 1997 Bissey had appeared suicidal and he had responded to his condition, which alerting the authorities would have exacerbated. His defense claimed he had the right to maintain "professional secrecy", which the court said did not apply to his relationship with Bissey. In October 2000, Bissey had been sentenced to 18 years in prison for molesting eleven minor boys. Cardinal Castrillon Hoyos, Prefect of the Congregation for the Clergy, wrote Pican to say he was glad to have "a brother bishop who in the eyes of history and of all the world's bishops would choose prison over denouncing his priest". He said Pope John Paul II had approved his letter to Pican.

Pope Benedict XVI accepted his resignation, which he was required to submit when he turned 75 on 27 February 2010, on 12 March 2010. His retirement ceremony, held on 21 February, took place in the Basilica in Lisieux because the Bayeux cathedral was too small to accommodate the crowds expected. Asked about the way he handled the case of the sexual abuse he said that "Today I would not report it any more than yesterday" and that he "preferred to be condemned by his country's justice than betray his conscience".

In retirement Pican remained active within the Salesians and the Episcopal Conference of France, where at the age of 80 he was tasked with representing the concerns of retired clergy. He lived first with the Salesian community in Paris and then on rue Picpus with the community of Petites Sœurs des Pauvres.

Pican died on 23 July 2018 at the age of 83.

== Notes ==
Catholic Church titles
Preceded by Jean Badré	Bishop of Bayeux; 1988–2010	Succeeded by Jean-Claude Boulanger
