= Samson (bishop of Worcester) =

11th and 12th-century Bishop of Worcester

- Bishop of Worcester
- Elected: 1096
- Term ended: 5 May 1112
- Predecessor: Wulfstan II
- Successor: Theulf
- Previous post: Treasurer of Bayeux

Orders
- Ordination: 7 June 1096
- Consecration: 8 June 1096

Personal details
- Died: 5 May 1112
- Denomination: Roman Catholic

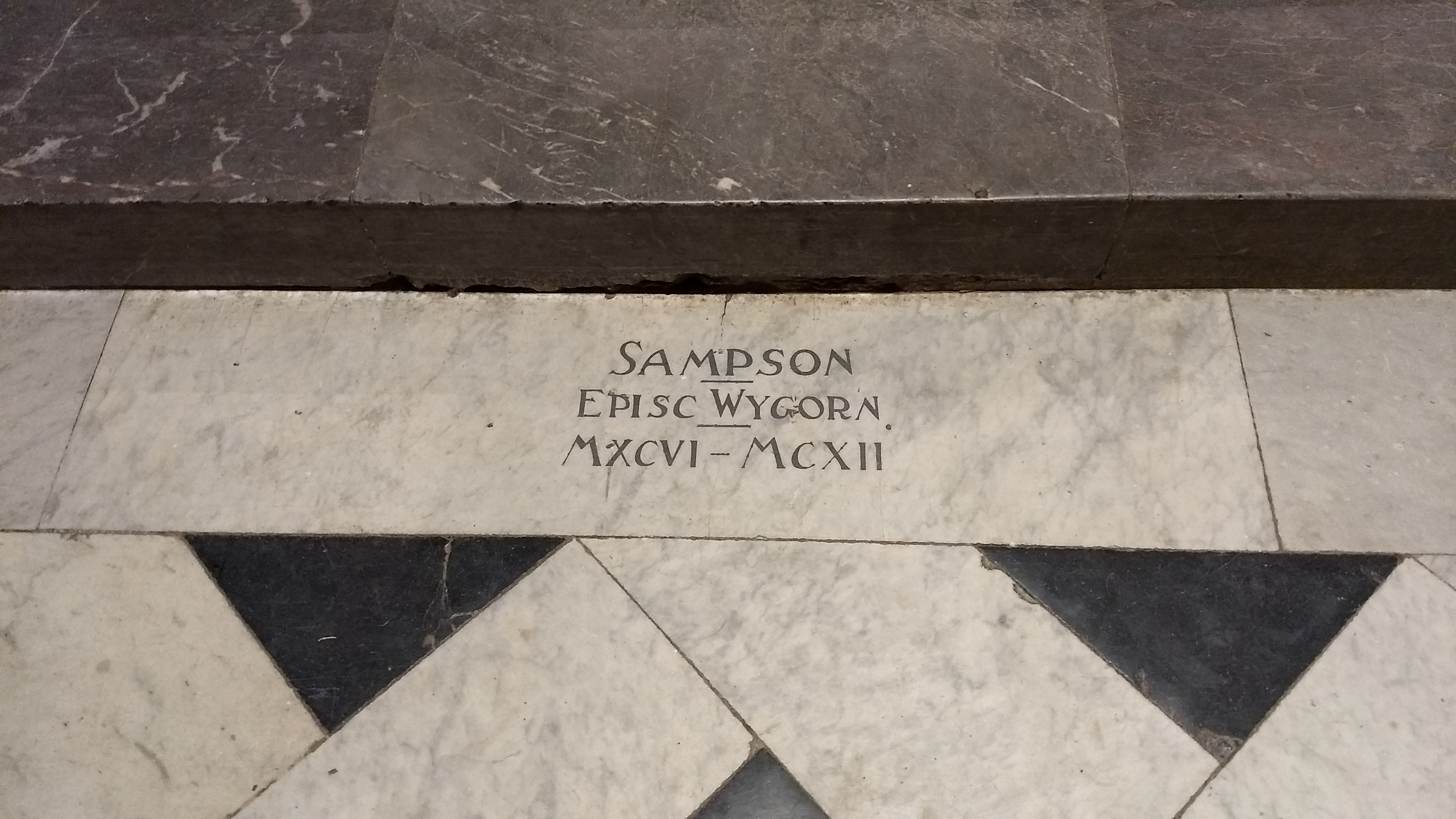
Tomb / grave marker of Sampson, in the floor of Worcester Cathedral

Samson (also Sampson; died 5 May 1112) was a medieval English clergyman who was Bishop of Worcester from 1096 to 1112.

== Life ==
Samson was a royal chaplain and a canon and treasurer of the diocese of Bayeux.

In the Domesday Book Samson is referred to as the chaplain and is recorded as holding St Peter's Collegiate Church, Wolverhampton and considerable properties in southern Staffordshire, most of which he sublet to either the canons of St Peter's or to other clergy.

David Bates, a biographer of William the Conqueror, suggests that William wished to put Samson forward for the bishopric of Le Mans following the death of Bishop Arnold on 29 November 1081. However the account by Orderic of this event says that Samson convinced William that another candidate, Hoel, was much worthier, based on his humble and pious nature. Bates writes “Since Samson did eventually become a bishop, succeeding Wulfstan at Worcester in 1095, he was probably being disingenuous.”

In 1096 Samson was elected bishop of Worcester; he was ordained as a deacon and priest on 7 June 1096 and consecrated as bishop on 8 June 1096. Being a bishop did not prevent him from fathering a daughter, Isabelle of Douvres, and two sons who also became bishops. His son Richard was bishop of Bayeux from 1108 to 1133, and his son Thomas was archbishop of York from 1108 to 1114. Samson's daughter, Isabelle of Douvres was known for her liaison with Robert, 1st Earl of Gloucester. Their illegitimate son was Richard, who was bishop of Bayeux from 1135 to 1142.

It has been suggested that Samson may possibly have been the scribe who oversaw the compilation of Domesday Book by the historian V. H. Galbraith.

Samson died on 5 May 1112.

== Citations ==
Catholic Church titles
Preceded by Wulfstan	Bishop of Worcester; 1096–1112	Succeeded by Theulf
