= Gérétran of Bayeux =

Saint and bishop

Gérétran of Bayeux, also known as Geretrandus, was bishop of Bayeux in the 5th century. He is considered a pre-congregational saint by the Roman Catholic Church, though because of the unstable times in which he lived, very little is known of his life.

During the Viking invasion he undertook moving the remains of saint Exuperius to a more safe location where they remain to this day.
