= Pierre Cally =

French philosopher and theologian

- Born: 25 September 1630; Ménil-Hubert-sur-Orne, France
- Died: 31 December 1709 (aged 79); Caen, France
- Known for: philosopher and theologian

Pierre Cally (25 September 1630 – 31 December 1709) was a French Catholic Cartesian philosopher and theologian.

== Life ==
He was born at Ménil-Hubert-sur-Orne near Falaise, now Orne, France. In 1660 he was appointed professor of philosophy and eloquence in the University of Caen, and in 1675, president of the Collège des Arts in the same city. In 1684 he assumed charge of the parish of Saint-Martin. He was an associate of Pierre Daniel Huet, who converted him to Cartesianism, and Jean Renaud de Segrais. Cally died 31 December 1709.

== Works ==
He wrote a course of philosophy, Universæ philosophiæ institutiones (Caen, 1695), in which the theories of Descartes are explained and defended. He worked for the conversion of Protestants, and gave conferences in which he endeavoured to solve their difficulties. For the same purpose, and in reply to the Jesuit Louis Le Valois, he composed a book on the Eucharist, Durand commenté, ou accord de la philosophie avec la théologie touchant la transsubstantiation de l'eucharistie (Caen, 1700). In it he denies the existence of absolute accidents and, instead of transubstantiation, admits a transformation. Before and after the consecration the matter of the bread remains the same; by the consecration the matter of the bread becomes the matter of the body of Christ. A publisher in Caen was asked to print sixty copies of the work to be sent to competent judges before making it public. In fact, eight hundred copies were printed immediately and sold. At once the book became the subject of many discussions, and was bitterly denounced. On 30 March 1701, François de Nesmond, bishop of Bayeux condemned seventeen propositions taken from Cally's work as leading to heresy concerning transubstantiation. Cally made a public retraction on 21 April that year.

He also wrote

- "Doctrine hérétique et schismatique touchant la primauté du pape enseignée par les jésuites dans leur collége de Caen" (1644);
- "Discours en forme d'homélies sur les mystères, sur les miracles et sur les paroles de Notre-Seigneur Jésus-Christ qui sont dans l'évangile" (Caen, 1703),

and published a new edition with commentaries of Boethius's work, De consolatione philosophiae (Caen, 1695).
