= Eudes de Lorris =

French bishop

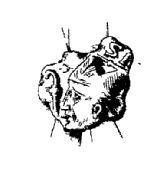
Seal of Eudes de Lorris

Eudes de Lorris, de Lory or de Lorry (died 8 August 1274) was Bishop of Bayeux in France from 1263 to his death.

== Biography ==
Eudes was born in Lorris in the present department of Loiret and the ancient province of the Orléanais. He was chaplain to Saint Louis (Louis IX of France) and a canon of Bayeux Cathedral when the chapter elected him bishop, but a few dissident canons voted instead for Adinolfo of Anagni, nephew and chaplain to Pope Gregory IX and dean of the cathedral. The contested election was submitted to Pope Alexander IV (died 1261), who decided in favour of Eudes; the election was confirmed by Alexander's successor, Urban IV on 9 May 1263. He was consecrated at Rouen in July of the same year by Archbishop of Rouen Eudes Rigaud.

In 1268, in the church of Saint-Victor in Paris, Eudes conducted the funeral of Renaud Mignon de Corbeil, bishop of Paris. In 1270, he gave the monks of the priory of Saint-Fromond a third of the mill at "Harel".

He attended the Second Council of Lyon in 1274, where he died on 8 August.
