= Dreamchild (album) =

Studio album by Toyah
- Released: May 1994
- Genre: Progressive pop; techno
- Length: 64:20
- Label: Cryptic
- Producer: Mike Bennett; Paul Moran; Tacye; Paul Mex; John Hillman; Simon Platz

Toyah chronology
Take the Leap! (1993)	Dreamchild (1994)	Looking Back (1995)

Singles from Dreamchild
- 1. "Out of the Blue" Released: 1993; 2. "Now and Then" Released: 1994

Phoenix cover

Professional ratings
Review scores
Source	Rating
AllMusic	(Dreamchild)
AllMusic	(Phoenix)
NME	5/10
Select	1/5 medals

Dreamchild is the sixth solo album released by the British singer Toyah Willcox, released in 1994 via Cryptic Records.

== Background ==
In 1992, Toyah began preparing a musical which was to be titled Cindy X, and for which several songs were written and recorded. When the project was abandoned, the songs were changed and revamped for inclusion in the album. Dreamchild is the album with the least amount of input from Willcox herself, with the singer contributing lyrics to only one track. The album was predominantly written by acclaimed producer Mike Bennett, whose credits for labels such as BMG, Trojan, Radikal and Creation Records include The Fall, BMX Bandits, Bob Marley, Kim Fowley, King Tubby and Lee "Scratch" Perry. The dance nature of the album also contrasts with the rest of her catalogue, making Willcox appear like more of a guest vocalist than the leading artist on her own album.

In 1997, the album was reissued by Receiver Records as Phoenix, featuring an additional track of the same name taken from the otherwise unreleased Eternity (Madhatter) sessions, and radically different artwork. However, it was missing the complete lyrics included in the original issue. The album was re-issued in the UK by Cherry Red Records in 2010. It added five extra tracks, including the original Cindy X versions of some songs and an outtake from the unreleased Eternity (Madhatter) sessions, yet excluded the song "Phoenix". This edition retains the original title and cover, albeit with Toyah's eyes open, not closed.

== Track listings ==
=== Original release ===
1. "Now and Then" (Mike Bennett) – 4:41
2. "Let Me Go" (Bennett) – 4:56
3. "World of Tension" (Bennett) – 4:23
4. "Out of the Blue" (Bennett) – 5:51
5. "Unkind" (Bennett) – 4:48
6. "Dreamchild" (Bennett) – 6:22
7. "Lost and Found" (Bennett) – 4:44
8. "Over You" (Bennett, Tacye) – 5:18
9. "I Don't Know" (Bennett, Toyah Willcox, Paul Mex, Tacye) – 5:16
10. "Disappear" (Bennett, Paul Moran, Tayce) – 2:42
11. "Tone Poem" (Bennett, Moran) – 7:10
12. "Now and Then" (Extended X-Rated Mix) – 7:59

=== 1997 Phoenix release ===
1. "Now and Then" – 4:41
2. "Let Me Go" – 4:56
3. "World of Tension" – 4:23
4. "Out of the Blue" – 5:51
5. "Unkind" – 4:48
6. "Dreamchild" – 6:22
7. "Lost and Found" – 4:44
8. "Over You" – 5:18
9. "I Don't Know" – 5:16
10. "Disappear" – 2:42
11. "Phoenix" (Bennett, Tacye, Bob Skeat) – 8:26
12. "Tone Poem" – 7:10
13. "Now and Then" (Extended X-Rated Mix) – 7:59

=== 2010 expanded release ===
1. "Tone Poem" – 7:10
2. "Now and Then" – 4:40
3. "Let Me Go" – 4:57
4. "World of Tension" – 4:23
5. "Out of the Blue" (Radio Mix) – 4:49
6. "Unkind" – 4:48
7. "Dreamchild" – 6:22
8. "Lost and Found" – 4:44
9. "Over You" – 5:18
10. "I Don't Know" – 5:17
11. "Disappear" – 2:42
12. "Open the Skies" (Bennett) – 4:20
13. "Another Way" (Bennett) – 4:37 (alternate version of "World of Tension")
14. "Over You" – 3:57 (Cindy X Version)
15. "Let Me Go" – 4:48 (Cindy X Version)
16. "Lost and Found" – 5:08 (Cindy X Version)

== Personnel ==
- Toyah Willcox – lead vocals
- Paul Moran – keyboards, brass, programming and arrangements, associate producer
- Mike Bennett – guitar, loops, additional vocals, producer
- Tacye – additional vocals and samples, associate producer
- Paul Mex – producer, keyboards and programming on "Over You" and "I Don't Know"
- Jay Stapley – guitars on "Unkind" and "Disappear"
- Bob Skeat – bass
- Martin Keating, Angus Wallace, Warren Bassett – additional programming
- Simon Townsend – programming (2010 edition; tracks 13–16)
- Keith Airey – guitars (2010 edition; tracks 13–16)
- Tony Lowe – guitars, keyboards (2010 edition; tracks 13–16)
- Steve Redford – drums (2010 edition; tracks 13–16)
- Lacey Bond, Pippa Gillaro – backing vocals on track 15

Production

- Martin Keating, Angus Wallace, Warren Bassett, Paul Mex, Simon Stevens – engineers
- Sasha Adams – tape operator
- Phil Nicholas – digital editing
- Simon Davey – mastering
- John Hillman, Simon Platz – executive producers
- Craig Astley – executive producer (2010 edition; tracks 13–16)
- André Jacquemin – producer, mixing (2010 edition; tracks 13–16)
