= Richard of Gloucester (disambiguation) =

Richard of Gloucester may refer to:

- Richard of Gloucester (bishop of Bayeux) (died 1142), bishop from 1138
- Richard de Clare, 6th Earl of Gloucester (1222–1262), earl from 1230
- Richard III of England (1452–1485), king from 1483
- Prince Richard, Duke of Gloucester (born 1944), duke from 1974
