= Contentius =

French bishop and saint

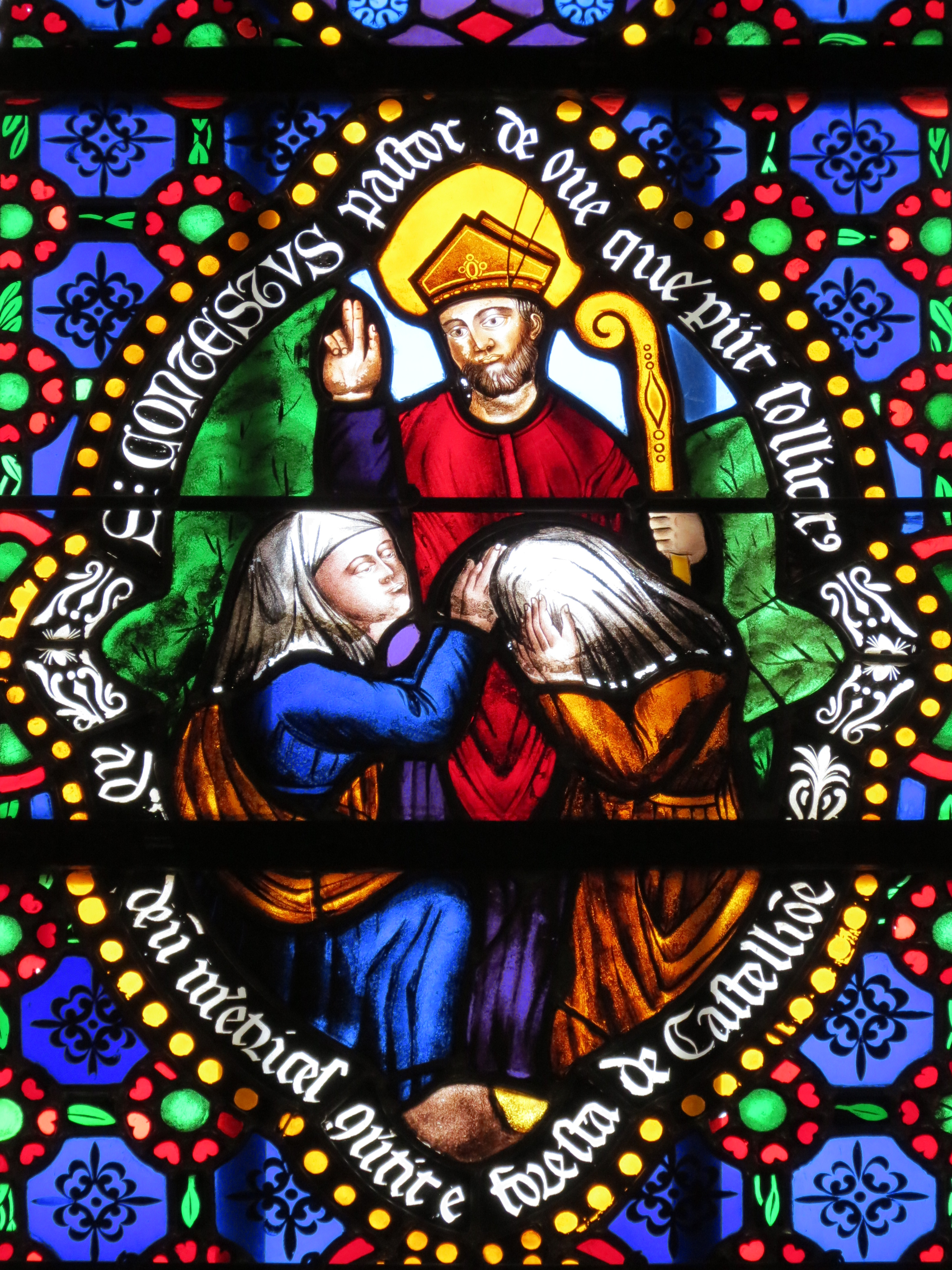
Saint Contest, bishop of Bayeux, successor of Manvieu. Stained glass window from 1839 by Duval and Panchet Bellerose in the Saint-Hilaire, Saint-Contest and Sainte-Honorine chapels.

Contentius (died 510) was bishop of Bayeux from 480 until his death. He is a Catholic and Orthodox saint. His feast day is 19 January.

== Biography ==
According to Father Elie, he was Bayeusain, and his hermitage was located at Blay, near Bayeux.

His great reputation for holiness brought him many visits from pilgrims who came to him for spiritual comfort.

However, the inhabitants managed to have him named bishop of Bayeux to succeed Saint Manvieu. In this function he fought against the idolatry that still existed in this country, as well as against the nobles who traded it.

He has been attributed several miracles, one of which, on the way to Sees, he made water from the ground to Athis-de-l'Orne to quench his companions.

He died in 513. First buried in the church of Saint-Exupére, he was transferred in 1162 to the Benedictine abbey of Fécamp. His relics were then transported to Argentan where they escaped the Huguenots in 1562. The translation of his right femur in the church of Saint-Contest was done in 1896 during a great ceremony.

A municipality of the Caen conurbation is called Saint-Contest and the town of Mayenne is called Contest.
