= Guillaume Bonnet =

Archdeacon of Passais

Guillaume Bonnet (died 3 or 12 April 1312) was the archdeacon of Passais in the fourteenth century.

== Biography ==
Guillaume Bonnet, the son of Bertrand Bonnet, lord of Beuville and La Chapelle, was raised in the diocese of Angers and became archdeacon of Passais and Bishop of Bayeux.

Pope Clement V who, by a papal bull of 1305, reserved the faculty to provide to the church of Bayeux in case of vacancy, in 1306 named Guillaume Bonnet, previously treasurer of the church of Angers to govern that church. Philip the Fair sent Guillaume Bonnet to Hainault with Robert VI, Count of Auvergne and Count of Boulogne, in 1307, in order to compel William, Count of Flanders, to pay him homage for his fief of Ostrevant which belonged to the crown of France.

Clement V appointed him one of the bishops charged with examining the cause of the Knights Templar.

In 1308, he gave a house that he owned in rue de la Harpe in Paris, and some pieces of land in the village of Gentilly, for the foundation of a college which took the name of College of Bayeux, intended for young people of his diocese and the dioceses of Mans and Angers.
