= Regnobert of Bayeux =

French Roman Catholic saint

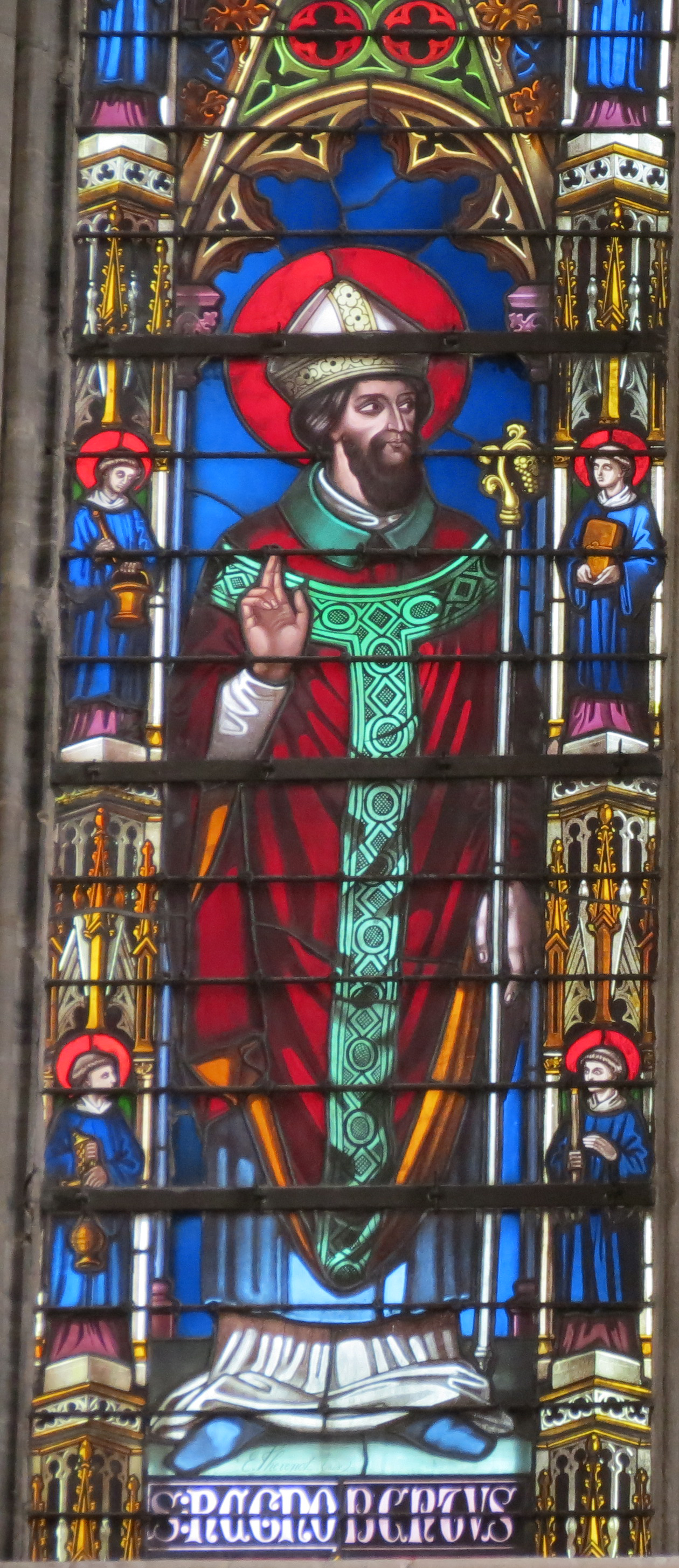
St Regnobert portrayed in a stained glass window in Notre-Dame Cathedral, Bayeux

Regnobert of Bayeux (died in 627 or towards 666), Regnobertus in Latin, also transcribed in Renobert, Rénobert, Rennobert or Raimbert, was the twelfth bishop of Bayeux and a Saint of the Roman Catholic Church in the 7th century.

== Life ==
Saint Regnobert was born in Noron-la-Poterie, a village southwest of Bayeux, the former Gallo-Roman capital of Bajocasses (Augustodurum) and seat of a bishopric.

Completing the work begun by Saint Exupere of Bayeux, Saint Regnobert converted the Saxons in the 620s, which earned him the title of the second Apostle of Bessin.

According to tradition, he was the founder of four churches in Caen: St. Saviour, Notre Dame, Saint Pierre and Saint Jean. Only Saint-Pierre and Saint-Jean seem to have really existed in the seventh century.

He is also credited with founding the chapel at the origin of the pilgrimage to the Délivrande Ragnobertus as the bishop of Bayeux around 627 was present at the Council of Clichy in 627.

He died around 666. His feast day is celebrated on 24 October.
