= Raoul d'Avranches =

French Catholic bishop

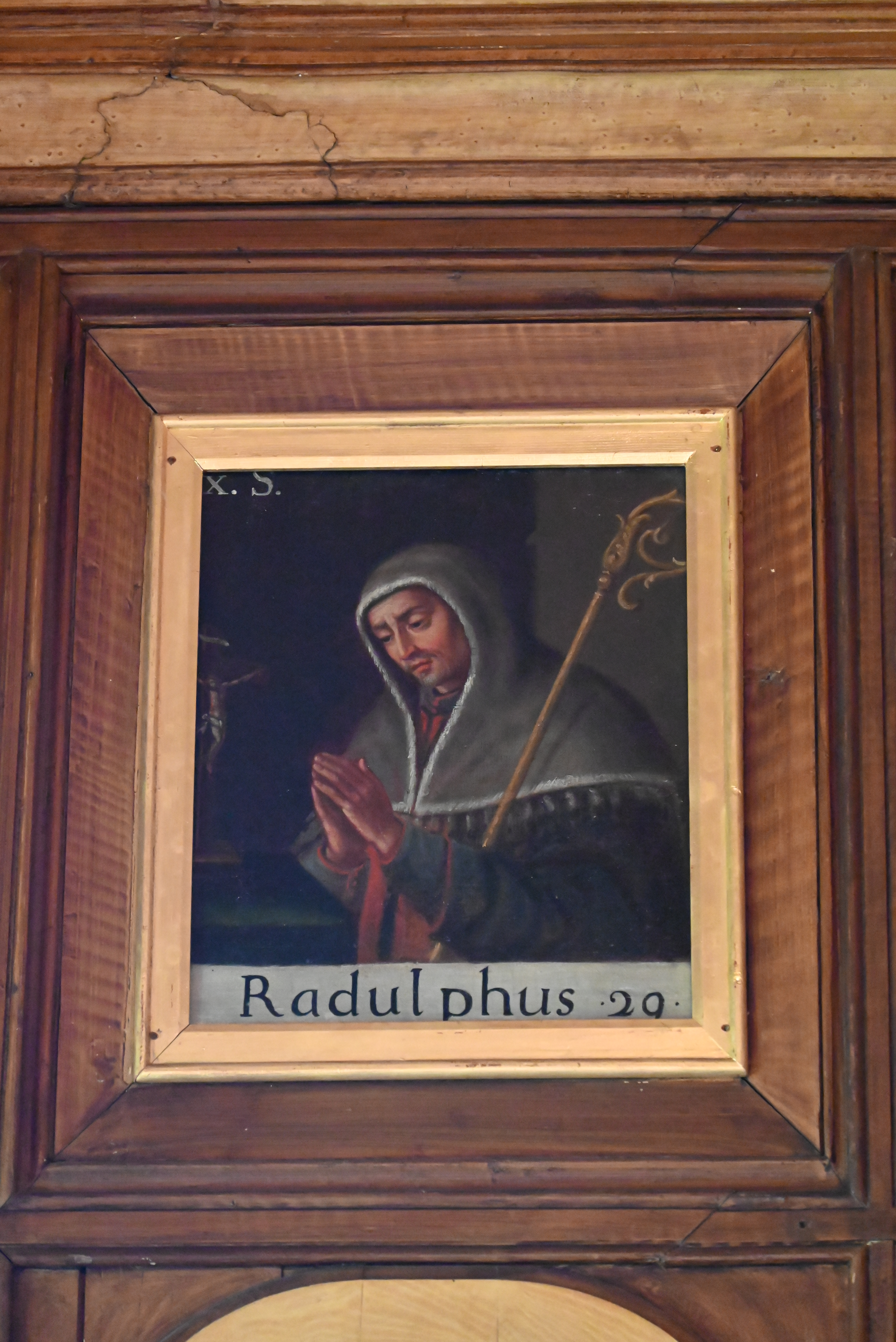

Raoul d'Avranches (Radulfus) was a bishop of Bayeux at the end of the 10th century and the beginning of the 11th century.

== Biography ==
Originally from Dol-de-Bretagne, Raoul was from a noble family.

He succeeded bishop Richard and became bishop of Bayeux in 986.

According to the Gallia Christiana, he occupied the seat around 966, but this date seems unlikely.

He signed for foundations in favor of the abbey of Fécamp by the Duke of Normandy in 989 and attended a council held in Rouen in 990.

He was present at the dedication of the church of S. Trinité at Fécamp in 990.

In 1006 a fire destroyed the cathedral of Bayeux.

Radulfus died shortly after the fire.
