= Henri de Pardieu =

Bishop of Bayeux

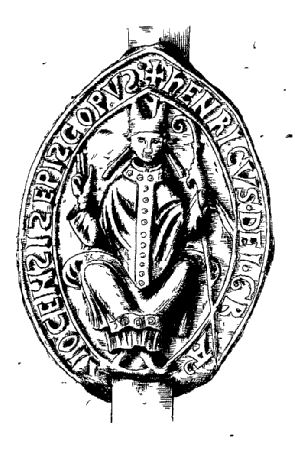
:Sceau d'Henri de Pardieu.

Henri de Pardieu was a bishop of Bayeux at the end of the 12th century (1165-1205).

== Biography ==
Of English origin, he was chaplain to Henry II of England and Dean of Salisbury

He was appointed bishop of Bayeux in 1165

In 1181, Archbishop Rotrou of Warwick being ill, Henry consecrated the church of Valasse Abbey in his place.

He was present at the provincial council of Rouen held by Archbishop Gautier de Coutances around 1183 to restore ecclesiastical discipline.

He was appointed commissioner with Étienne I of Nemours, bishop of Tournay, and Rohan, dean of Bayeux, to examine the dispute between the archbishop of Tours and the bishop of Dol.

He died in 1205 in Bayeux and was buried in the choir of the cathedral.
