= Mathurin de Savonnières =

Bishop of Bayeux

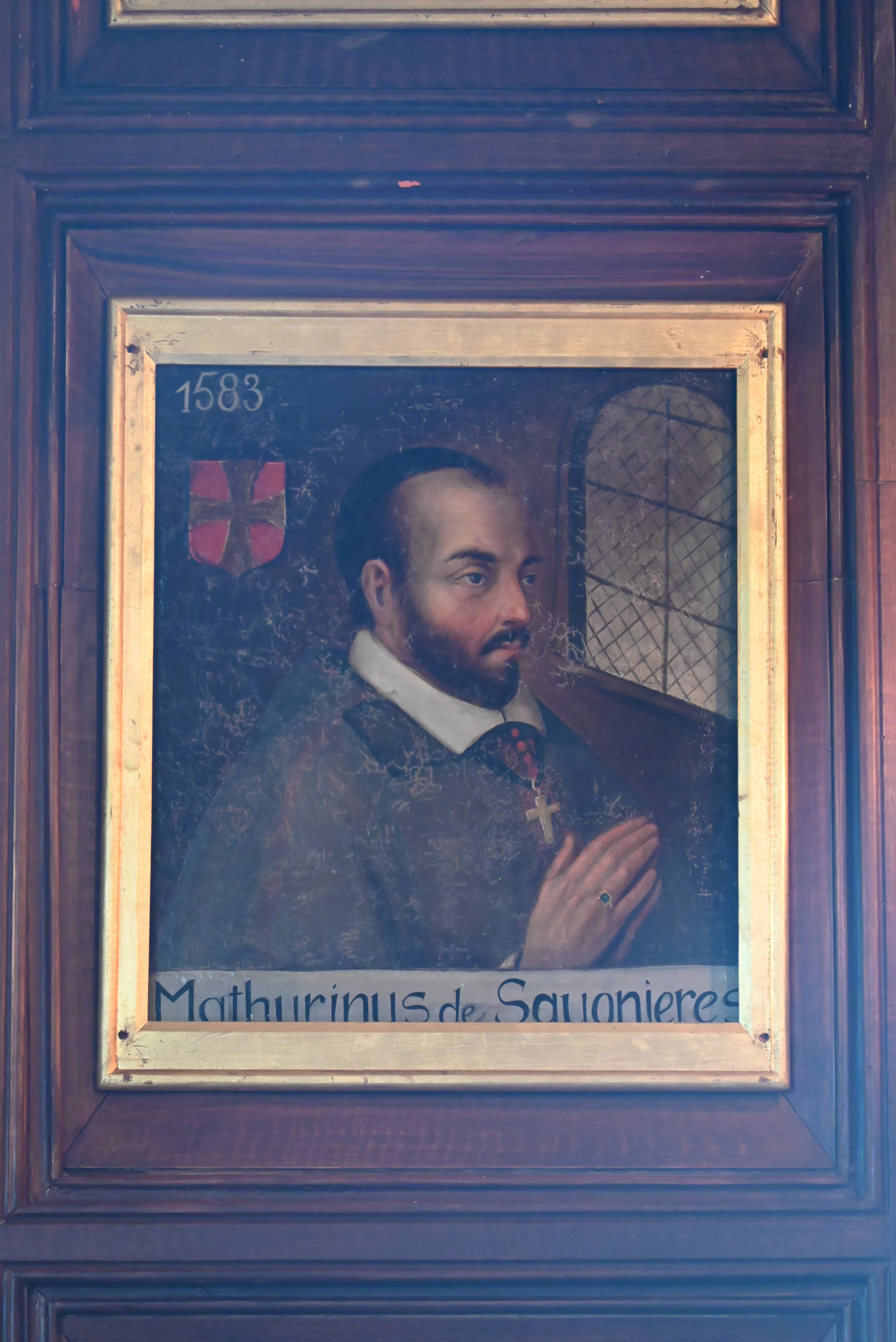
Mathurin de Savonnières, 1583

Mathurin de Savonnières, born in Angers and died in 1586 in Paris, was a French bishop of the sixteenth century. Mathurin was the son of Jean, Lord of Brétèche, and Olive de Mathefelon. His brother Jacques was Abbot of Cadouin and Melleray and his sister Jeanne Abbess of Cordillon.

== Biography ==
He was commendatory abbot of Eaunes, in the diocese of Toulouse, and is, in this capacity, syndic of the States of the province of Comminges, Astarac and Bigorre. Henri III appointed him to the bishopric of Bayeux in 1583, by the favor of François de Bourbon-Conti, who received the income from the bishopric of which he cannot have the title. This prelate most often resides in Paris.
