= André Jacquemin =

André Jacques Marie Jacquemin
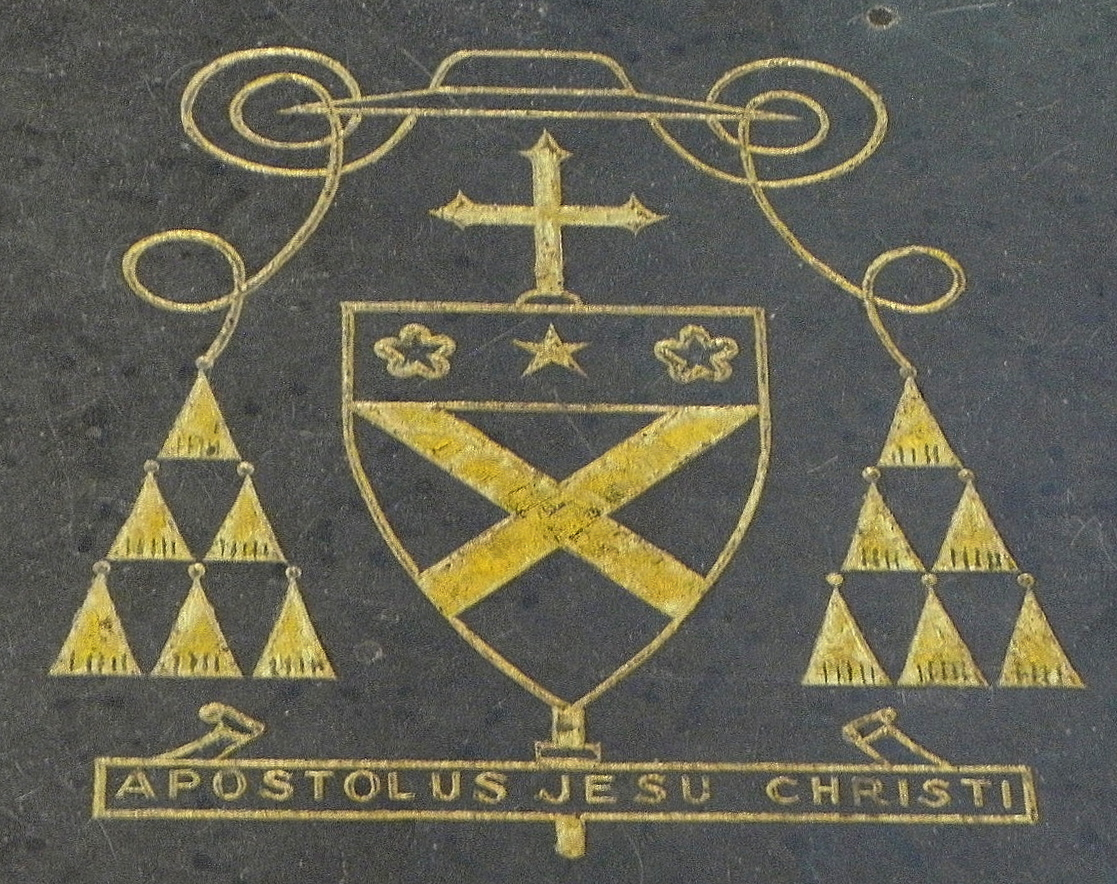
- Ledger stone in the Cathedral of Notre-Dame de Bayeux.
- Church: Catholic Church
- Predecessor: Francois-Marie Picaud
- Successor: Jean Badre
- Previous posts: Deacon (November 1, 1925–1926) and Priest (April 3, 1926–51) of Roman Catholic Diocese of Soissons; Titular Bishop (December 20, 1951-) of Cartennae; Titular Bishop of Elvas; Coadjutor Bishop, Bishop, and Bishop Emeritus (October 29, 1954 – December 10, 1969) of Bayeux and Lisieux

Personal details
- Born: André Jacques Marie Jacquemin; January 24, 1902 Verdun
- Died: December 20, 1975 (aged 73) Hermival-les-Vaux, unspecified cause of death
- Buried: Roman Catholic Diocese of Bayeux and Lisieux

André Jacquemin (André Jacques Marie Jacquemin; born January 24, 1902, died December 20, 1975) was a Bishop Emeritus of the Roman Catholic Diocese of Bayeux and Lisieux.
