= Jacques Habert =

French prelate

Mgr. Jacques Habert
- Bishop of Bayeux and Lisieux
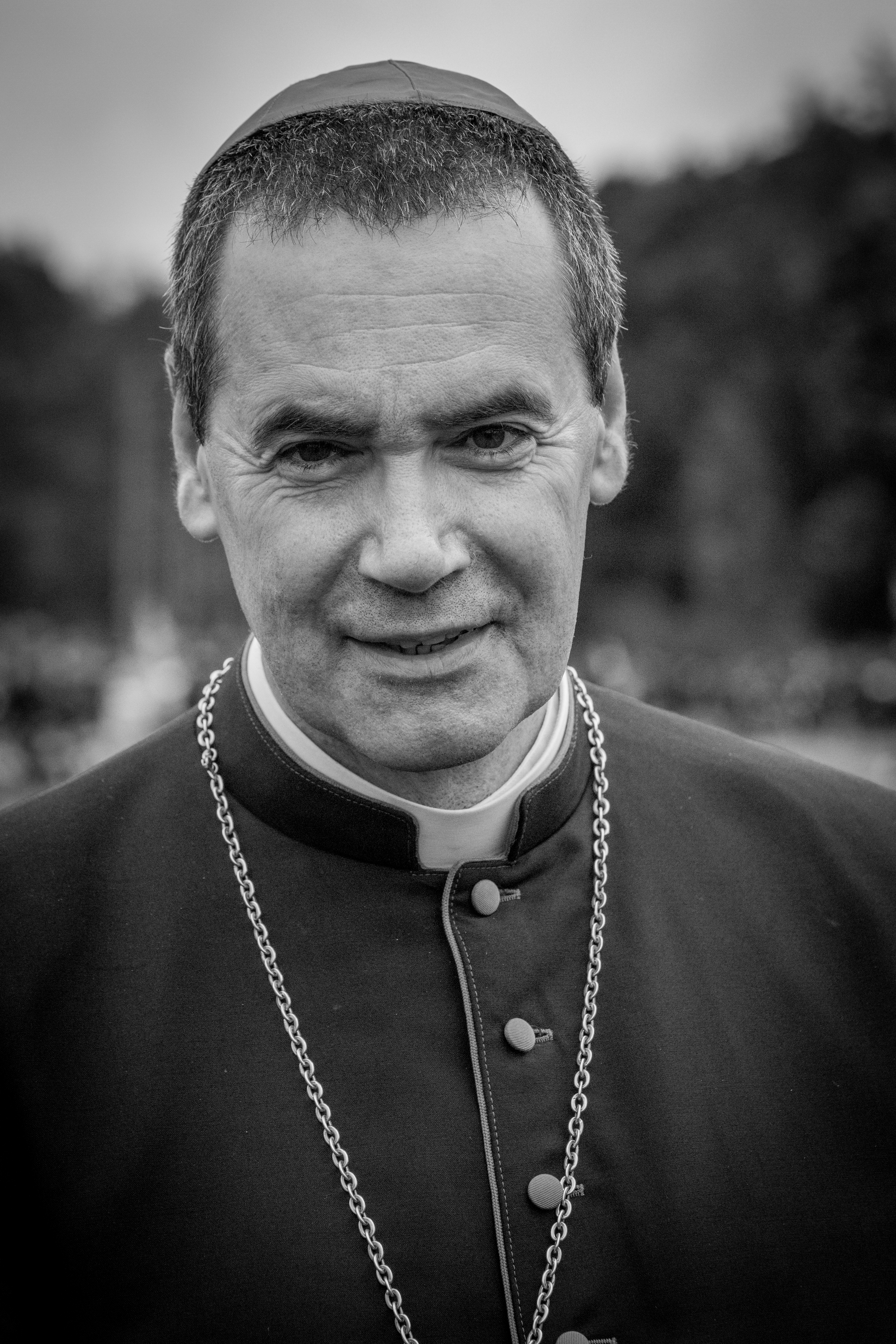
- Habert in 2014.
- Church: Catholic Church
- See: Diocese of Bayeux and Lisieux
- Installed: 10 November 2020
- Predecessor: Jean-Claude Boulanger

Orders
- Ordination: 30 September 1989
- Consecration: 9 January 2011 by Jean-Claude Boulanger, Jean-Charles Descubes and Michel Santier
- Rank: Prelate

Personal details
- Born: 2 May 1960 (age 65); Saint-Malo, France
- Motto: Latin: Manete in dilectione mea.; French: Demeurez dans mon amour.
- Coat of arms

Jacques Habert (born Jacques Léon Jean Marie Habert; in 2 May 1960) is a French prelate of the Catholic Church who has served as Bishop of Bayeux and Lisieux since 2020.
