= Ménil-Hubert-sur-Orne =

- Commune
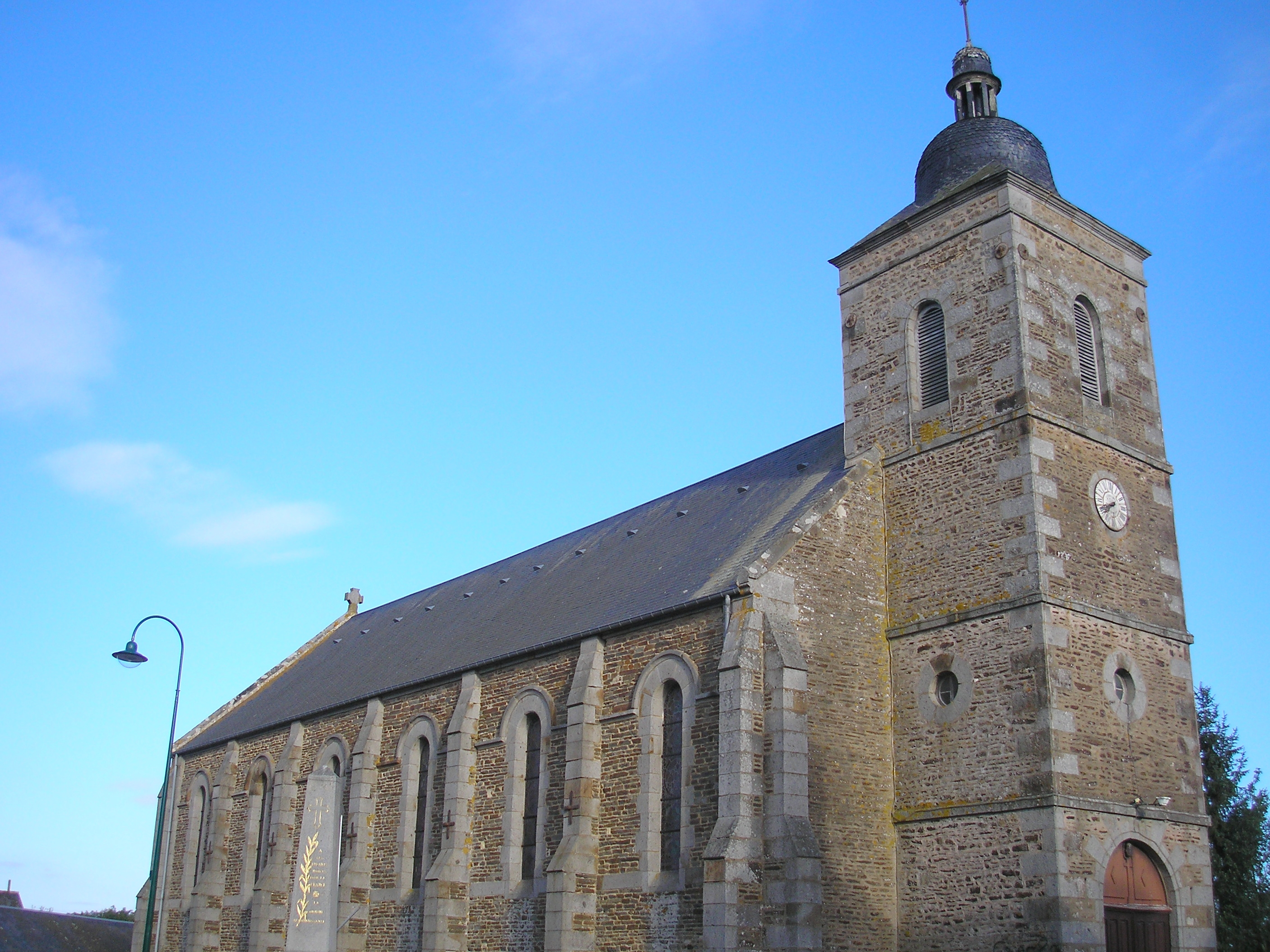
- The church in Ménil-Hubert-sur-Orne
- Location of Ménil-Hubert-sur-Orne
- Location within France Location within Normandy
- Coordinates: 48°51′11″N 0°24′43″W
- Country: France
- Region: Normandy
- Department: Orne
- Arrondissement: Argentan
- Canton: Athis-Val de Rouvre
- Intercommunality: CA Flers Agglo

Government
  - Mayor (2020–2026): Jacky Alleau
- Area^{1}: 10.68 km^{2} (4.12 sq mi)
- Elevation: 110 m (360 ft)
- Highest elevation: 236 m (774 ft)
- Lowest elevation: 46 m (151 ft)
- Population (2023): 472
  - Density: 44.2/km^{2} (114/sq mi)
- Time zone: UTC+01:00 (CET)
  - Summer (DST): UTC+02:00 (CEST)
- INSEE/Postal code: 61269 /61430
- ^{1} French Land Register data, which excludes lakes, ponds, glaciers > 1 km^{2} (0.386 sq mi or 247 acres) and river estuaries.

Ménil-Hubert-sur-Orne (French pronunciation: [menil ybɛʁ syʁ ɔʁn], literally Ménil-Hubert on Orne) is a commune in the Orne department in north-western France.

== Geography ==
The commune is part of the area known as Suisse Normande.

The commune is made up of the following collection of villages and hamlets, Losier,Grignon, Le Hamel, La Branle, Rouvrou, La Batonnière, La Davillerie, Les Monts and Ménil-Hubert-sur-Orne.

The Commune with another 20 communes shares part of a 2,115 hectare, Natura 2000 conservation area, called the Vallée de l'Orne et ses affluents.

The commune has 4 watercourses running through it, with 3 rivers the Orne plus two of its tributaries the Noireau and the Rouvre. The other watercourse is a stream called Ruisseau de la Mare des Bois.

== People linked with the commune ==
- Pierre Cally (1630-1709), a French Catholic Cartesian philosopher and theologian was born here.

== See also ==
- Communes of the Orne department
