= Loup de Bayeux =

Loup de Bayeux, saint Loup or sometimes saint Leu was a bishop of Bayeux between 440 and 470.

Loup de Bayeux was born in Bayeux and was raised in paganism, then converted by Rufinien, third bishop of Bayeux, who would have given him the title of deacon. Sylvester, archbishop of Rouen, would have given him the episcopal anointing after a child who had not yet spoken would have designated him Wolf. He was more likely to be elected per saltum (that is, before being ordained priest) by the assembly of the clergy and the faithful and sacred by Sylvester. According to legend, he fought a monstrous wolf that terrorized the city and lived in a wood. Wolf de Bayeux would have killed him by throwing him into the Drome in the commune that now bears his name, Saint-Loup-Hors, at the gates of Bayeux. According to Jean Hermant, he took care of the duties of his ministry, assisted by a priest named Aufiac. He would have rendered sight to two blind men.

Fisquet, p. 8, expresses the belief (Nous craignons bien) that Loup de Bayeux legend, in the Life of Saint Regnobert, is not Apocryphal. Duchesne, pp. 219–220, no. 3. A reign of thirty-two years is attributed to him.

Loup de Bayeux would have died between 464 and 474 according to Jules Lair; Hermant quotes the date of 25 October 461 or the year 4655. He was buried in Saint-Exupère church in Bayeux. In 863, his body and that of Saint Exupère would have been sheltered from Norman incursions at the castle of Palluau en Gatinois. His relics were then kept at the abbey of Cormery in Touraine, then in the cathedral Saint-Spire of Corbeil from the year 1000, alongside those of Saint Exupère, first bishop of Bayeux7. They will be thrown to the Seine by the revolutionaries in 1793.

Saint Loup de Bayeux is celebrated on 28 May and 25 October.
