= Turold de Brémoy =

Bishop of Bayeux

Turold de Brémoy was Bishop of Bayeux in the 12th century.

Turold was appointed bishop by King William Rufus, nephew of Bishop Odo of Bayeux.

Though appointed in 1097, Turoldus did not take possession until 1099. In 1105 Henry I of England made war on Robert Curthose, and burned the cathedral and town of Bayeux. After the Battle of Tinchebray on 27 September 1106, Turoldus resigned his diocese and retired to the Abbey of Bec, where he died in 1146.

== Family ==
Turold was the son of Hugues de Brémoy. Turoldus' brother Hugues had founded the Priory of Saint-Laurent de Brémoy.
