= Bernardin de Saint-François =

French bishop

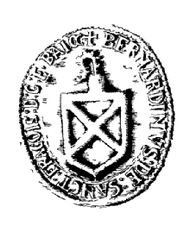
Seal of Bernardin of Saint Francis

Bernardin de Saint-François, born in 1529 at the Château de Ronceray in Marigné and died on July 14, 1582, at the priory of Bersay in Saint-Mars-d'Outillé, was a French bishop of the 16th century. This prelate, a great scholar, wrote as well in Greek as in Latin and in French. We have several small poems by him which have remained in manuscript.

== Biography ==
Bernardin de Saint-François was born at the Château de Ronceray, in Marigné, in 1529.

He became dean of the cathedral of Le Mans, prior of Bersay, and of the order of Grandmont and commendatory abbot of the abbey of Fontaine-Daniel. He is provided with the office of adviser to the parliament of Paris and master of requests. Pope Gregory XIII did not want to grant bulls of translation to Renaud de Beaune, bishop of Mende, whom Charles IX had appointed to the bishopric of Bayeux, this prince gives this episcopal seat to Bernardin de Saint-François.

He resigned his position as abbot of Fontaine-Daniel, around 1570, choosing himself as successor Jean de Morderet, squire, on the indication, it seems, of Louis Garnier, monk of Saint-Maur, his friend and his attorney.

By a decree of the parliament of Rouen in 1576, he was granted the right of deportation, by virtue of which he was allowed to collect the fruits of the first year in the church of Saint-Ouen de Périers, and, the same year he instituted as the penitentiary of his church Marc Guérin de la Bigne, doctor at the Sorbonne. In 1580 Bernardin buys to establish a college there, a house in the rue aux Coqs.
