= Journy =

- Commune
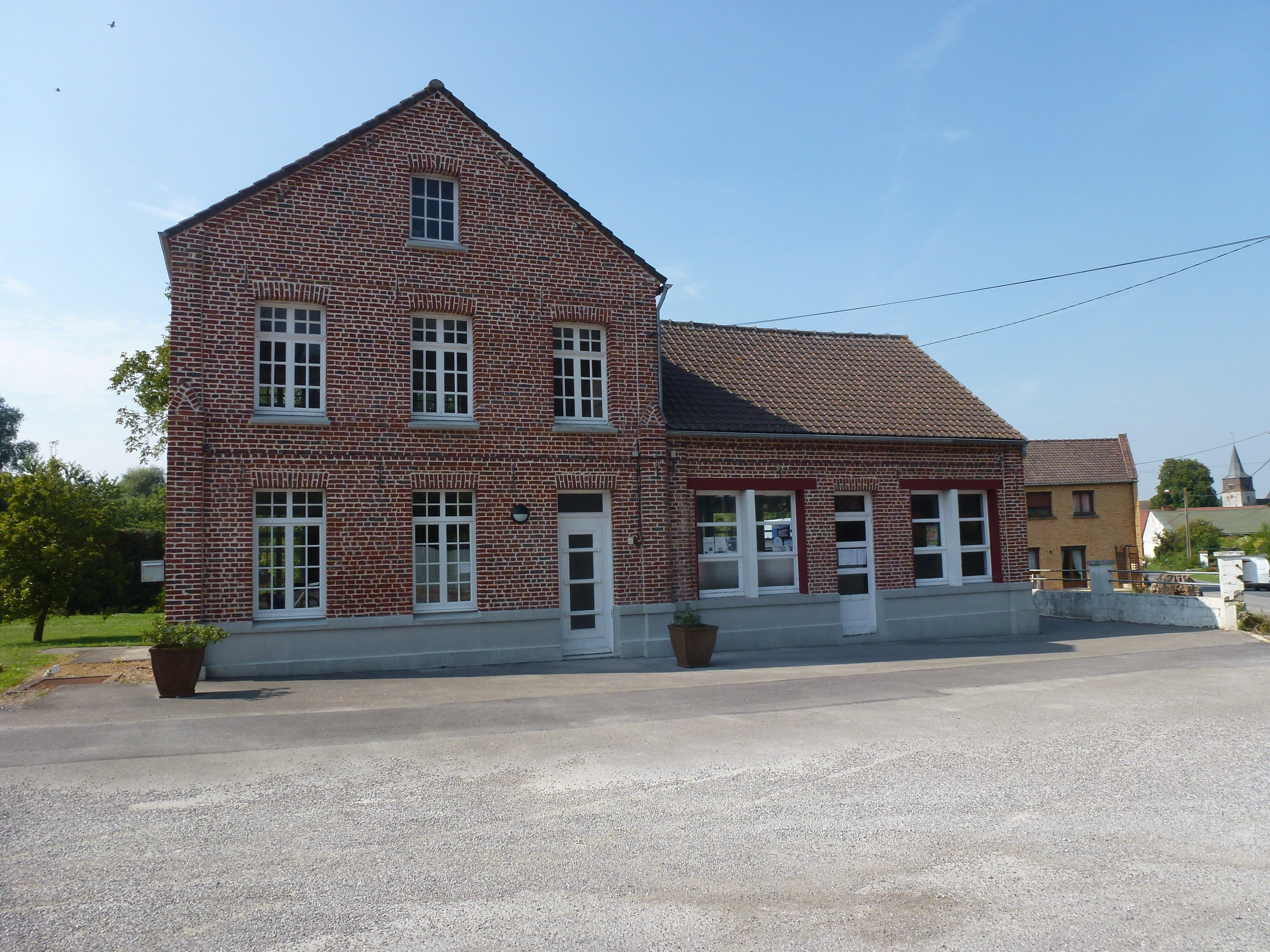
- The town hall of Journy

- Coat of arms
- Location of Journy
- Location within France Location within Hauts-de-France
- Coordinates: 50°45′12″N 1°59′45″E
- Country: France
- Region: Hauts-de-France
- Department: Pas-de-Calais
- Arrondissement: Saint-Omer
- Canton: Lumbres
- Intercommunality: Pays de Lumbres

Government
  - Mayor (2021–2026): Micheline Cocquerel
- Area^{1}: 3.35 km^{2} (1.29 sq mi)
- Elevation: 144 m (472 ft)
- Highest elevation: 184 m (604 ft)
- Lowest elevation: 69 m (226 ft)
- Population (2023): 310
  - Density: 93/km^{2} (240/sq mi)
- Time zone: UTC+01:00 (CET)
  - Summer (DST): UTC+02:00 (CEST)
- INSEE/Postal code: 62478 /62850
- Website: mairie-journy.fr
- ^{1} French Land Register data, which excludes lakes, ponds, glaciers > 1 km^{2} (0.386 sq mi or 247 acres) and river estuaries.

Journy (French pronunciation: [ʒuʁni]) is a commune in the Pas-de-Calais département in the Hauts-de-France region of France 10 miles (16 km) west of Saint-Omer.

== Population ==
Historical population
Year	Pop.	±% p.a.
1968	241	—
1975	239	−0.12%
1982	221	−1.11%
1990	246	+1.35%
1999	230	−0.74%
2007	272	+2.12%
2012	273	+0.07%
2017	287	+1.01%
2023	310	+1.29%
Source: INSEE

== Transport ==
The Chemin de fer d'Anvin à Calais opened a railway station at Journy in 1881. The railway was closed in 1955.

The local newspaper l'Independent reported that in April 1908, 70 acres (280,000 m^{2}) of the Dornes and 35 acres (140,000 m^{2}) of woodland of Journy were burning, with a fire still burning 3 hours after the passing of the train, which justified a police investigation.

== See also ==
- Communes of the Pas-de-Calais department
