= Exuperius of Bayeux =

Saint Exuperius of Bayeux
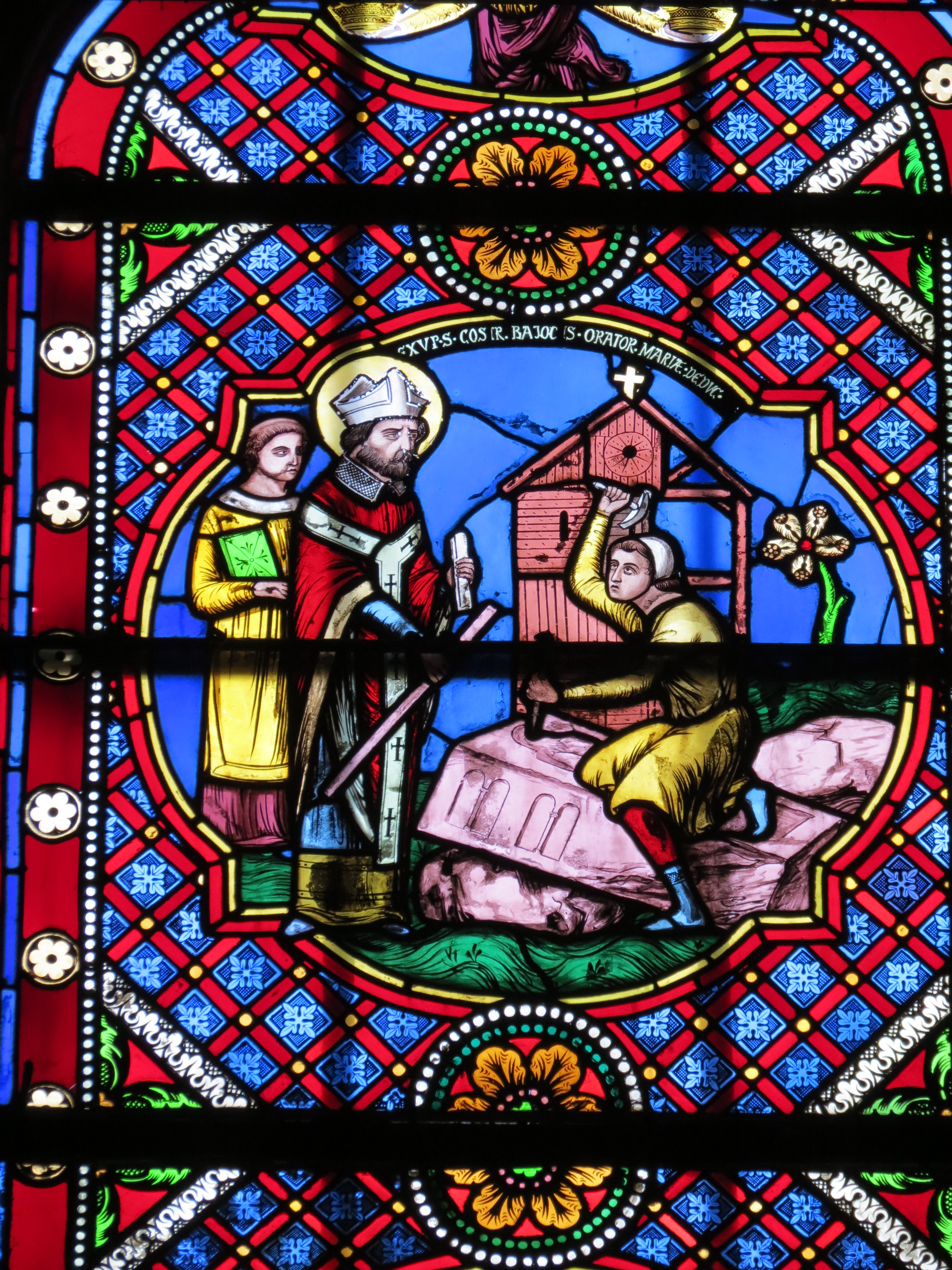

Bishop
- Died: 405 AD
- Venerated in: Roman Catholic Church Eastern Orthodox Church
- Feast: August 1

Saint Exuperius of Bayeux (Exupère), also known as Spirius (Spire, Soupir, Soupierre), is venerated as the first bishop of Bayeux. The date of his episcopate is given as 390 to 405, but local legends made him an immediate disciple of St. Clement, who lived during the 1st century, and that St. Regnobertus was Exuperius' disciple. This legend was found in breviaries of the 15th century. According to the Catholic Encyclopedia, “the Bollandists and M. Jules Lair found little ground for this legend; it was only towards the middle of the fourth century that St. Exuperius founded the See of Bayeux; after him the priest St. Reverendus worked to spread Christianity in these parts.” As Henry Wace writes, “this is only an instance of the tendency of the Gallic churches to claim an apostolic or subapostolic origin.”.

== Veneration ==
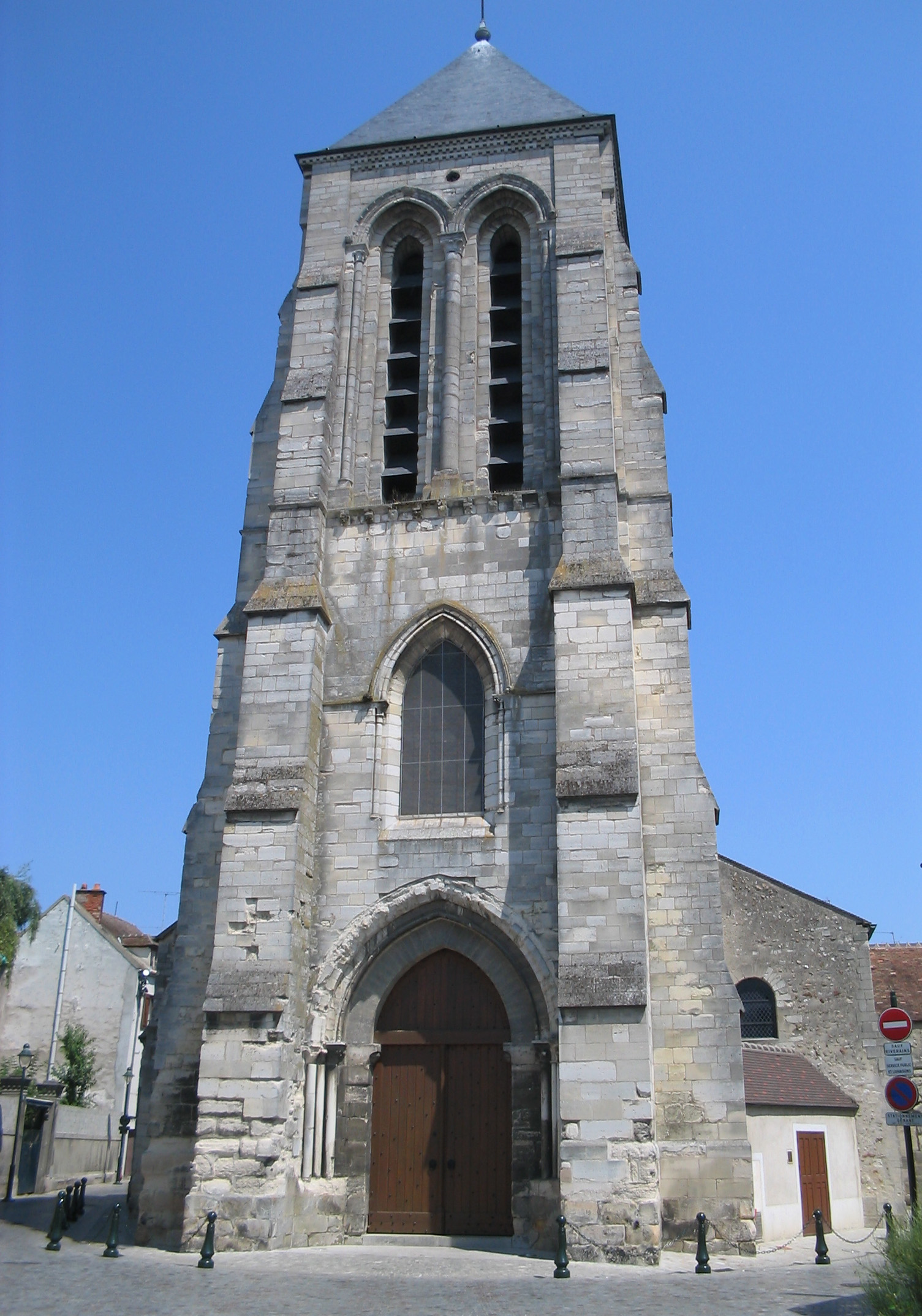
Saint-Spire Cathedral, Corbeil-Essonnes.

In the times of the invasion of the Vikings Exuperius’ relics were translated from Bayeux, and eventually were deposited at Corbeil; the Saint-Spire cathedral in Corbeil-Essonnes is dedicated to him. Those kept in Corbeil were thrown into the Seine by the revolutionaries in 1793.

He is sometimes called a bishop of Corbolium (Corbeil) as a result of this translation.
