= Richard of Gloucester (bishop of Bayeux) =

Bishop of Bayeux (died 1142)

Richard of Gloucester or Richard FitzRobert was appointed bishop of Bayeux in France in 1138 and died in 1142. He was the eldest son of Robert, 1st Earl of Gloucester, but he was illegitimate. His mother was Isabel of Dover, daughter of Samson of Worcester, Bishop of Worcester.

He was the nephew of Richard de Douvres, his predecessor in the see of Bayeux.

== Biography ==
His father obtained the see of Bayeux by the support he gave to King Henry I.

Richard donated the church and the dîme d'Isigny to the cathedral chapter in 1138. The same year, he consecrated the Abbey of Ardenne, dedicated in honour of the Blessed Virgin.

== Sources ==
- D. Crouch, "Robert of Gloucester's Mother and Sexual Politics in Norman Oxfordshire", Historical Research, 72 (1999) pp 323–332.
- D. Crouch, Robert, first earl of Gloucester (b. before 1100, d. 1147), Oxford Dictionary of National Biography, Oxford University Press (2006).
- Everett U. Crosby, The King's Bishops: The Politics of Patronage in England and Normandy, 1066–1216 (Palgrave Macmillan, 2013), p. 172.
