= Manveus of Bayeux =

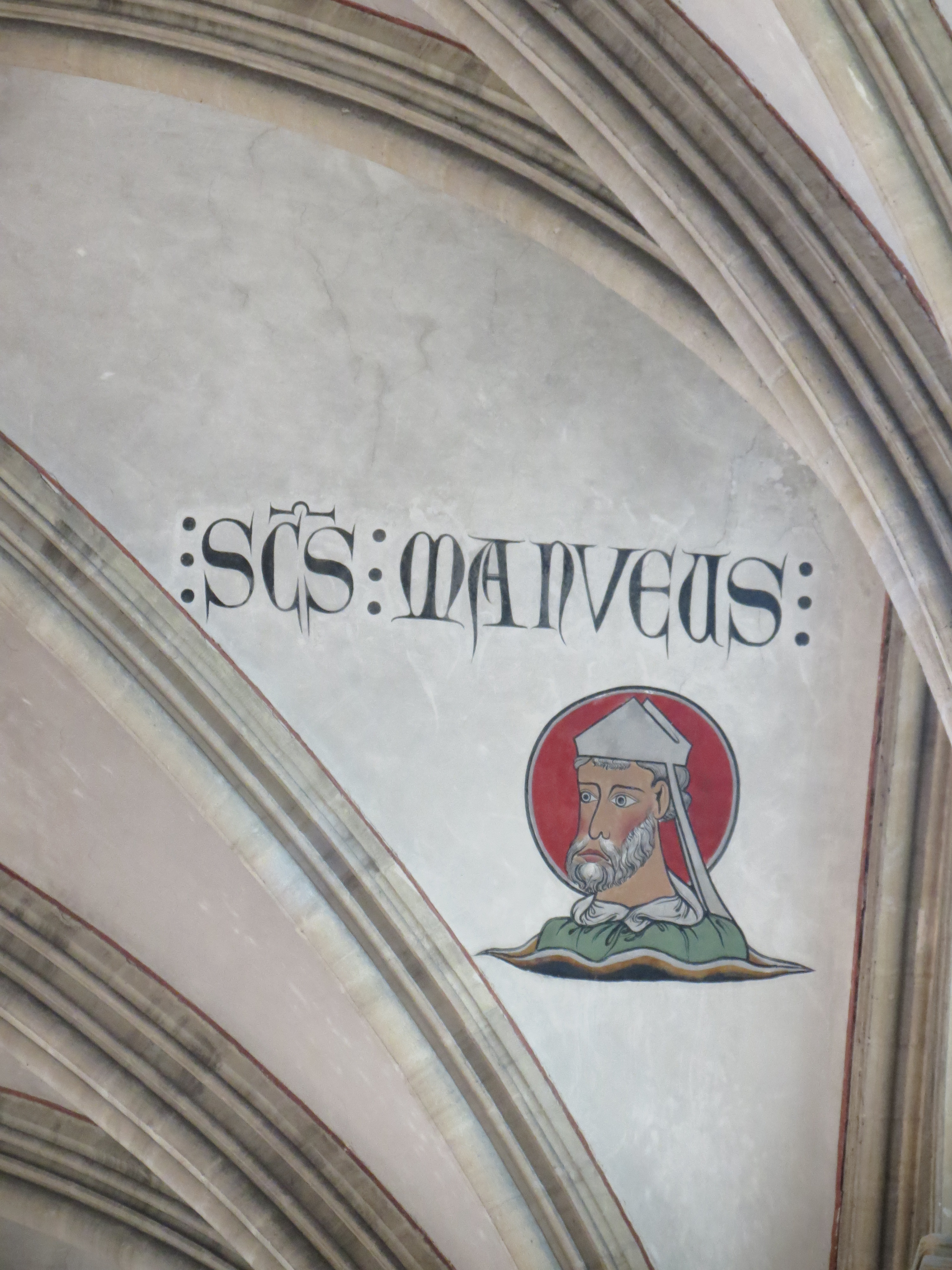
Miniature of Saint-Manvieu

Manvieu or Manveus' or sometimes Manve, Mange, Manvien, Mar-Wig, (died 480) was the sixth bishop of Bayeux.

Manvieu was born in Bayeux, at number 13 rue Franche, in a wealthy Christian family. His parents would have sent him to the Kingdom of Kent in what is now England to learn human sciences. On his return to the Bessin, he would have tried to convert the inhabitants to Christianity but, faced with the lack of success of his business, would have retired with three companions to live in solitude and the practice of mortification and penance. Responding to a divine call, he would have left his exile to return to Bayeux. While a funeral convoy was passing in front of his father's house, he would have revived the deceased, thus gaining the esteem of the population. He would have then proceeded to miraculous cures of patients. Became a bishop around 470, he would have humbly performed his duties, doing penance and fasting for forty days in a row, which would have made this bishop say that he had been good at first, better in the middle and very good at the end. He died on 28 May 480 and was buried in the Saint-Exupère church in Bayeux, at the foot of the southern wall, between the altar and the tower (the current Saint-Exupère church is posterior to these observations).

Saint Manvieu Bayeux is celebrated on 28 May. Two communes of Calvados, Saint-Manvieu-Norrey and Saint-Manvieu-Bocage, bear his name.
