= Thomas de Fréauville =

Bishop of Bayeux, France (d. 1239)

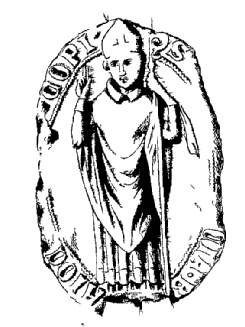
Seal of Thomas de Fréauville

Thomas de Fréauville (Latin: Thomas de Freauvilla) (died 1239) was a bishop of Bayeux of the 13th century.

He was the son of Rogo and Berta, from a noble family established in Rouen. Michael, a canon of the cathedral, could have been a relative.

De Freauville became archdeacon of Bayeux in 1221, and dean of the chapter of the cathedral of Rouen in 1225, a title that he retained until 1231.

The chapter of Rouen Cathedral proceeded in 1229 to the election of a new archbishop, following the death of Thibaut of Amiens. Part of the chapter elected Thomas, while the other part chose Maurice, bishop of Le Mans. After an appeal to the Holy See and the appointment on May 4, 1230, of two investigators, Adam de Chambly (bishop of Senlis) and Jean de Montmirail, the election was overturned. Thomas renounced his rights and Pope Gregory IX transferred Maurice from Le Mans to Rouen in 1231.

Also in 1231 Thomas became archdeacon of Amiens, and acceded to the bishopric of Bayeux in 1233, following the death of Robert des Ablèges in 1231. He remained bishop until 1238 and died in 1239.
