= Diocese of Bayeux and Lisieux =

Diocese of the Roman Catholic Church in France

Coordinates: 49.2777°N 0.706472°W

Diocese of Bayeux and Lisieux Dioecesis Baiocensis et Lexoviensis Diocèse de Bayeux et Lisieux

Catholic
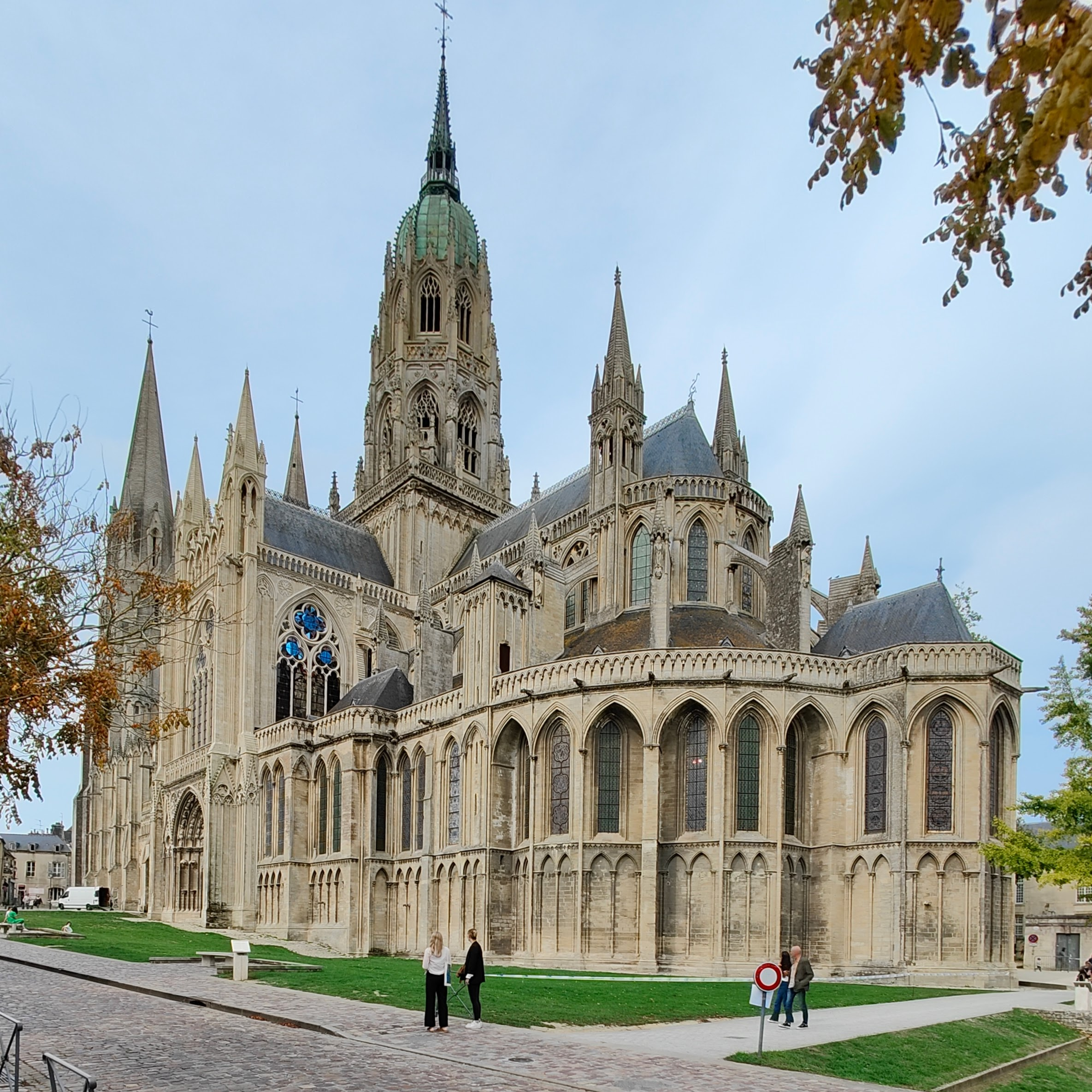
- Bayeux Cathedral

Location
- Country: France
- Ecclesiastical province: Rouen
- Metropolitan: Archdiocese of Rouen

Statistics
- Area: 5,548 km^{2} (2,142 sq mi)
- Population: Total; Catholics: (as of 2022); 694,056; 406,160 (est.) (58.5%)
- Parishes: 51

Information
- Denomination: Catholic
- Sui iuris church: Latin Church
- Rite: Roman Rite
- Established: 5th Century
- Cathedral: Cathedral of Notre Dame in Bayeux
- Co-cathedral: Co-Cathedral of St. Peter in Lisieux
- Secular priests: 104 (Diocesan); 48 (Religious Orders); 31 Permanent Deacons

Current leadership
- Pope: Leo XIV
- Bishop: Jacques Habert
- Metropolitan Archbishop: Dominique Lebrun
- Bishops emeritus: Jean-Claude Boulanger

Map

Website
- bayeuxlisieux.catholique.fr

The Diocese of Bayeux and Lisieux (Latin: Dioecesis Baiocensis et Lexoviensis; French: Diocèse de Bayeux et Lisieux) is a Latin Church diocese of the Catholic Church in France. It is coextensive with the Department of Calvados and is a suffragan to the Archdiocese of Rouen, also in Normandy.

With the Concordat of 1802, the former Diocese of Lisieux was merged with that of Bayeux. A pontifical brief in 1854 authorized the Bishop of Bayeux to call himself Bishop of Bayeux and Lisieux.

In 2022, in the Diocese of Bayeux and Lisieux there was one priest for every 2,672 Catholics.

== History ==
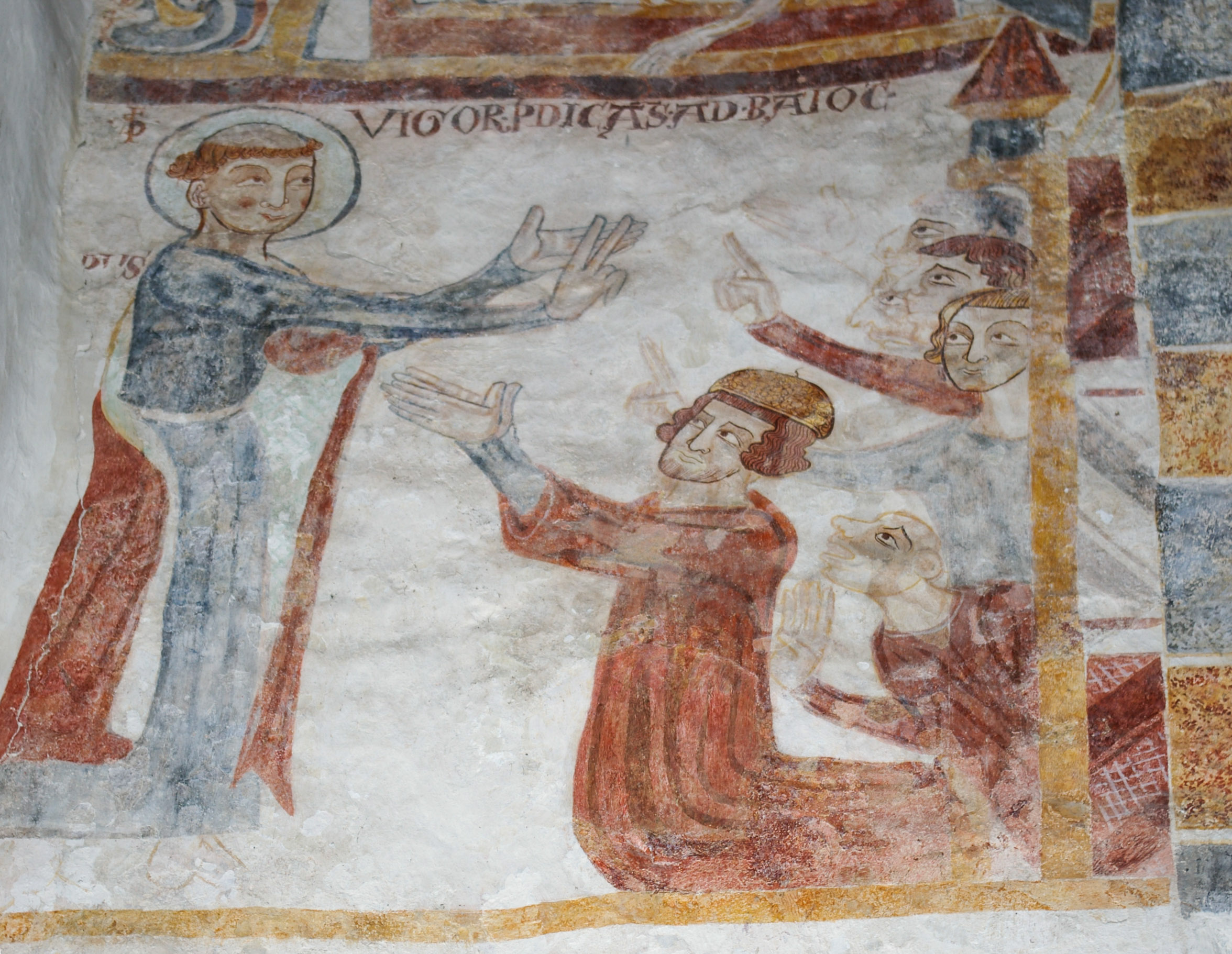
Saint Vigor was bishop of Bayeux during the 6th century.

A local legend found in 15th-century breviaries calls St. Exuperius an immediate disciple of Pope Clement I (88 to 99 CE), and the first Bishop of Bayeux. His see would according to this therefore have been founded in the 1st century. Regnobert of Bayeux, the same legend tells us, succeeded St. Exuperius. But neither the Bollandists, Jules Lair, nor Louis Duchesne found no basis for this legend; it was only towards the end of the 4th century or beginning of the 5th century that Exuperius might have founded the See of Bayeux.

Some successors of St. Exuperius were honored as saints:

- Referendus, Rufinianus, and Lupus (about 465)
- Saint Vigor (early 6th century) destroyed a pagan temple, then still in use
- Regnobert of Bayeux (about 629) founded many churches and the legend anachronistically calls him the first successor of Exuperius
- Hugues (d. 730) was simultaneously bishop of two other sees, Paris and Rouen.

Odo of Bayeux (1050–97), brother of William the Conqueror, built the cathedral and was present at the Battle of Hastings. He was imprisoned in 1082 for attempting to lead an expedition to Italy to overthrow Pope Gregory VII, and died as a crusader in Sicily. Cardinal Agostino Trivulzio (1531–48), papal legate in the Roman Campagna, was trapped in the Castel Sant'Angelo during the siege and pillage of Rome by the Imperial forces led by the Constable de Bourbon. Arnaud Cardinal d'Ossat (1602–04) was a prominent diplomat identified with the second conversion of Henry IV of France from Protestantism to Catholicism. Claude Fauchet, former court religieux to Louis XVI, became one of the "conquerors" of the Bastille. He was chosen Constitutional Bishop of Bayeux in 1791, and beheaded 31 October 1793. Léon-Adolphe Amette, Archbishop of Paris was, until 1905, Bishop of Bayeux.

A council at Caen in 1042, summoned by Duke William ('the Conqueror') and the bishops of Normandy, proclaimed the Truce of God, not for the first time. In 1061 a council was again summoned by Duke William, who commanded the attendance of both clergy and laity (bishops, abbots, political and military leaders). The statutes of a synod held at Bayeux about 1300 furnish a very fair idea of the discipline of the time.

In the Diocese of Bayeux are the Abbey of St. Stephen (Abbaye-aux-Hommes) and the Abbey of the Holy Trinity (Abbaye-aux-Dames), both founded at Caen by William the Conqueror (1029–87) and his wife Matilda of Flanders in expiation of their unlawful marriage. The Abbey of Saint-Étienne was first governed by Lanfranc (1066–1070), who afterwards became Archbishop of Canterbury. Other abbeys were those of Troarn of which Durand of Troarn, the successful opponent of Berengarius, was abbot in the 11th century; and the Abbaye du Val, of which Armand-Jean de Rancé (1626–1700) was abbot, in 1661, prior to his reform of La Trappe Abbey. The Abbey of St. Evroul (Ebrulphus) in the Diocese of Lisieux, founded about 560 by Bayeux native St. Evroul, was the home of chronicler Ordericus Vitalis (1075–1141).

Bishop Guillaume Bonnet founded the Collège de Bayeux in Paris in 1308 to house students from the dioceses of Bayeux, Le Mans, and Angers studying medicine or civil law.

In 1641 Saint Jean Eudes founded the Congregation of Notre Dame de Charité du Refuge, devoted to the protection of reformed prostitutes. The mission of the nuns later expanded to include other services to girls and women, including education. In 1900 the Order included 33 establishments in France and elsewhere, each an independent entity. At Tilly in the Diocese of Bayeux, Michel Vingtras established, in 1839, the politico-religious society known as La Miséricorde in connexion with the survivors of La Petite Eglise, condemned in 1843 by Gregory XVI. Daniel Huet, the famous savant (1630–1721) and Bishop of Avranches, was a native of Caen.

Bishop François II de Nesmond authorized the establishment of the Congregation of the Mission of Saint-Lazare in the diocese of Bayeux in 1682.

During World War I, the diocese of Bayeux sent 260 priests and 75 seminarians into military service. Seventeen priests and sixteen seminarians died. In c. 1920 there were 716 parishes in the diocese.

== Bishops ==
=== To 1000 ===
- Exuperius 390? – 405?

Regnobertus (Regnobert, or Renobert, Rennobert, Raimbert): dubious

- Rufinianus ...–434
- Lupus c. 434 – c. 464

Patricius 464?–469?
Manveus 470?–480?
Contestus 480–513

- Vigor (Vigorus) 513–537
- Leucadius c. 538 – after 549

Lascivus

- Leodoaldus or Leudovald c. 581 – c. 614
- Gérétran of Bayeux (Geretrandus) or Gertran c. 615
- Ragnobertus 625–668
- Gerbold (Gereboldus) or Gerebauld) 689–691

Framboldus 691?–722?

- Hugo of Champagne 723–730
- Leodeningus, c. 765

Thior (Thiorus)

- Careviltus (Carveniltus) c. 833
- Harimbert or Ermbart 835–837

Saint Sulpice (Sulpicius) 838–844

- Baltfridus c. 843–858

[Tortoldus 859]

- Erchambert 859–c. 876
- Henricus (I.) c. 927–after 933
- Richard (I.)
- Hugo (II.) c. 965
- Raoul d'Avranches (also, Radulfus, Radulphus; 986–1006)

=== 1000 to 1300 ===
- Hugh de Bayeux 1011/1015–1049
- Odo of Bayeux 1049–1097
- Turold de Brémoy (Turoldus) or d'Envermeu 1097–1106
- Richard (II.) of Dover 1107–1133
- Richard (III.) of Gloucester 1135–1142
- Philippe d'Harcourt 1142–1163
- Henri (II.) 1163–1205
- Robert des Ablèges 1206–1231
- Thomas de Freauville 1232–1238

Sede vacante (1238–1241)

- Guy 1241–1260
- Eudes de Lory (Odo de Lorris) 1263–1274
- Gregory of Naples 1274–1276
- Pierre de Beneis 1276–1306

=== 1300–1500 ===
- Guillaume (I.) Bonnet 1306–1312
- Guillaume (II.) de Trie 1312–1324
- Pierre (II.) de Lévis. 1324–1330
- Guillaume (III.) de Beaujeu 1330–1337
- Guillaume (IV.) Bertrand 1338–1347
- Pierre (III.) de Villaine 1347–1360
- Louis (I.) Thézart 1360–1373
- Milon de Dormans 1374–1375
- Nicolas du Bos 1375–1408
- Jean de Boissey or Jehan de Boissey 1408–1412
- Jean Langret 1412–1419
- Nicolaus II. Habart 1421–1431
- Zanon de Castiglione 1434–1459
- Ludwig II. d'Harcourt or Louis de Harcourt 1460–1479
- Charles de Neufchâtel 1480–1498
- René de Prie 1498–1516

=== 1500–1800 ===
- Louis de Canossa, O.Cist. 1516–1531
- Pierre (IV.) de Martigny 1531
- Agostino Trivulzio 1531–1548 (Administrator)
- Charles II. d'Humières 1549–1571
- Bernardin de Saint-François 1573–1582
- Mathurin de Savonnières, O.S.A. 1583–1586
- Charles de Bourbon 1586–1590 (Administrator)

Sede vacante (1590–1598)

- René de Daillon du Lude 1590–1600 (Administrator of temporalities?, 1590–1598)
- Arnault d'Ossat 1600–1604
- Jacques d'Angennes 1606–1647
- Édouard Molé 1647–1652
- François I. Servien 1654–1659
- François II de Nesmond 1661–1715
- Joseph-Emmanuel de La Trémoille 1716–1718
- François Armand of Lothringen-Armagnac 1719–1728
- Paul d'Albert de Luynes 1729–1753
- Pierre-Jules César de Rochechouart-Montigny 1753–1776
- Joseph-Dominique de Cheylus 1776–1797

- Claude Fauchet 1791–1793 (Constitutional Bishop)
- Julien-Jean-Baptiste Duchemin 1796–1798 (Constitutional Bishop)
- Louis-Charles Bisson 1799–1801 (Constitutional Bishop)

=== From 1800 ===
- Charles Brault (9 Apr 1802 Appointed – 8 Aug 1817
- Jean de Pradelles (1817–1818)
- Charles-François Duperrier-Dumourier (13 Jan 1823 Appointed – 17 Apr 1827 Died)
- Jean-Charles-Richard Dancel (2 Jun 1827 Appointed – 20 Apr 1836 Died)
- Louis-François Robin (25 May 1836 Appointed – 30 Dec 1855 Died)
- Charles-Nicolas-Pierre Didiot (7 Apr 1856 Appointed – 15 Jun 1866 Died)
- Flavien-Abel-Antoinin Hugonin (13 Jul 1866 Appointed – 2 May 1898 Died)
- Léon-Adolphe Amette (8 Jul 1898 Appointed – 21 Feb 1906
- Thomas-Paul-Henri Lemonnier (13 Jul 1906 Appointed – 29 Dec 1927 Died)
- Emmanuel Célestin Suhard (6 Jul 1928 Appointed – 23 Dec 1930
- François-Marie Picaud (12 Sep 1931 Appointed – 5 Aug 1954 Retired)
- André Jacquemin (29 Oct 1954 Succeeded – 10 Dec 1969 Resigned)
- Jean-Marie-Clément Badré (10 Dec 1969 Appointed – 19 Nov 1988 Retired)
- Pierre Auguste Gratien Pican, S.D.B. (19 Nov 1988 Succeeded – 12 Mar 2010 Retired)
- Jean-Claude Boulanger (12 Mar 2010 Appointed – 27 Jun 2020 Retired)
- Jacques Léon Jean Marie Habert (10 Nov 2020 Appointed – present)

== See also ==
- Catholic Church in France

== Bibliography ==
=== Reference works ===
- Gams, Pius Bonifatius (1873). Series episcoporum Ecclesiae catholicae: quotquot innotuerunt a beato Petro apostolo. Ratisbon: Typis et Sumptibus Georgii Josephi Manz. (Use with caution; obsolete)
- Eubel, Conradus, ed. (1913). Hierarchia catholica, Tomus 1 (second ed.). Münster: Libreria Regensbergiana. (in Latin)
- Eubel, Conradus, ed. (1914). Hierarchia catholica, Tomus 2 (second ed.). Münster: Libreria Regensbergiana. (in Latin)
- Gulik, Guilelmus (1923). Eubel, Conradus (ed.). Hierarchia catholica, Tomus 3 (second ed.). Münster: Libreria Regensbergiana.
- Gauchat, Patritius (Patrice) (1935). Hierarchia catholica IV (1592-1667). Münster: Libraria Regensbergiana.
- Ritzler, Remigius; Sefrin, Pirminus (1952). Hierarchia catholica medii et recentis aevi V (1667-1730). Patavii: Messagero di S. Antonio.
- Ritzler, Remigius; Sefrin, Pirminus (1958). Hierarchia catholica medii et recentis aevi VI (1730-1799). Patavii: Messagero di S. Antonio.
- Ritzler, Remigius; Sefrin, Pirminus (1968). Hierarchia Catholica medii et recentioris aevi sive summorum pontificum, S. R. E. cardinalium, ecclesiarum antistitum series... A pontificatu Pii PP. VII (1800) usque ad pontificatum Gregorii PP. XVI (1846) (in Latin). Vol. VII. Monasterii: Libr. Regensburgiana.
- Ritzler, Remigius; Pirminus Sefrin (1978). Hierarchia catholica Medii et recentioris aevi... A Pontificatu PII PP. IX (1846) usque ad Pontificatum Leonis PP. XIII (1903) (in Latin). Vol. VIII. Il Messaggero di S. Antonio.
- Pięta, Zenon (2002). Hierarchia catholica medii et recentioris aevi... A pontificatu Pii PP. X (1903) usque ad pontificatum Benedictii PP. XV (1922) (in Latin). Vol. IX. Padua: Messagero di San Antonio. ISBN 978-88-250-1000-8.
- Longnon, Auguste, ed. (1903). Recueil des historiens de la France: Pouillés (in French and Latin). Vol. Tome II: Pouillés de la province de Rouen. Paris: Imprimerie nationale. pp. 93–140. [lists of benefices]

=== Studies ===
- Duchesne, Louis (1910). Fastes épiscopaux de l'ancienne Gaule: II. L'Aquitaine et les Lyonnaises. Paris: Fontemoing. pp. 476–479.
- Du Tems, Hugues (1774). Le clergé de France, ou tableau historique et chronologique des archevêques, évêques, abbés, abbesses et chefs des chapitres principaux du royaume, depuis la fondation des églises jusqu'à nos jours (in French). Vol. Tome premier. Paris: Delalain.
- Farcy, Paul de (1887). Les abbayes de l'évêché de Bayeux. Tome I: Cerisy—Cordillon—Fontenay—Longues (Laval: L. Moreau 1887) (in French)
- Fisquet, Honoré Jean P. (1864). La France pontificale: Metropole de Rouen: Bayeux et Lisieux. Paris: E. Repos.
- Hermant, Jean (1705). Histoire du Diocèse de Bayeux (in French). Vol. Première partie. Caen: Pierre Doublet.
- Jean, Armand (1891). Les évêques et les archevêques de France depuis 1682 jusqu'à 1801 (in French). Paris: A. Picard.
- Laffetay, J. (Canon) (1855). Histoire du diocèse de Bayeux, XVIIe et XVIIIe siècles (in French). Bayeux: Delarue.
- Laffetay, J. (1877). Histoire de diocèse de Bayeux: XVIIIe et XIXe siècle. Vol. deuxième volume. Bayeux: H. Grobon et O. Payan.
- Lair, Jules (1862). Études sur les origines de l'évêché de Bayeux, I (in French). Paris: Durand.
- Lair, Jules (1867). "Études sur les origines de l'évêché de Bayeux, III" Bibliotheque de l'Ecole des chartes. 6th series (Vingt-neuvieme annee) (in French). Vol. Tome quatrieme (4). Paris: A. Frank. 1868. pp. 33–55.
- Masselin, M.-J. (1898). Le diocèse de Bayeux du Ier au XIe siècle: étude historique (in French). Caen: Veuve A. Domin. [a defense of tradition and legend by the Vicar of Vaucelles]
- Sainte-Marthe, Denis de; Benedictines of Saint-Maur (1759). Gallia christiana, in provincias ecclesiasticas distributa (in Latin). Vol. Tomus Undecimus: de provincia Rotomagensi. Paris: Johannes- Baptista Coignard.
- Société bibliographique (France) (1907). L'épiscopat français depuis le Concordat jusqu'à la Séparation (1802-1905). Paris: Librairie des Saints-Pères. pp. 346–350.

=== Acknowledgment ===
- Goyau, Georges. "Bayeux." The Catholic Encyclopedia. Vol. 2. New York: Robert Appleton Company, 1907, pp. 358–359. Retrieved: 26 Jun. 2017.
