= Rufinianus =

Third bishop of Bayeux in the 5th century

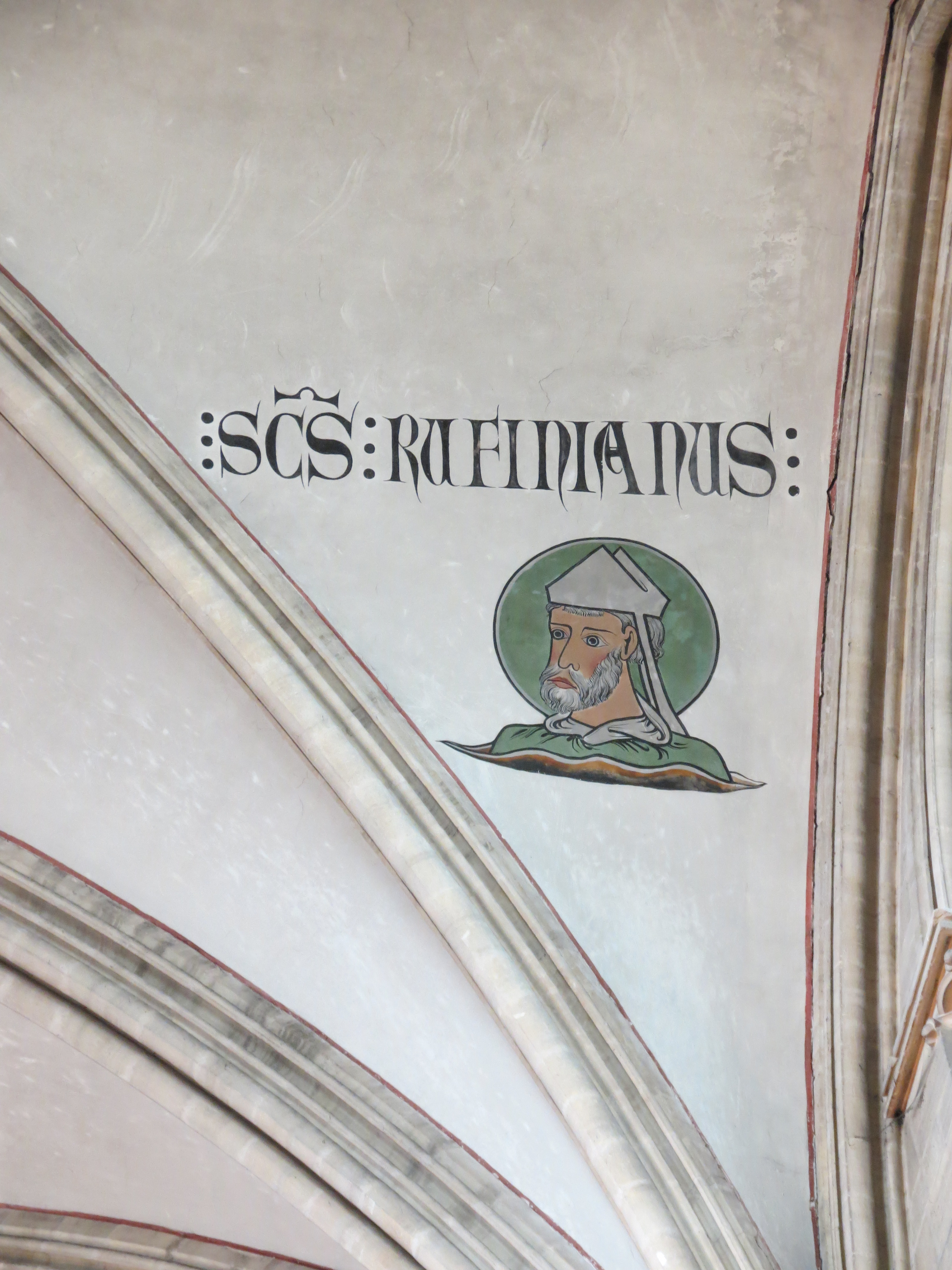
Saint-Rufinien.

Saint Rufinien was the third bishop of Bayeux in the 5th century.

Rufinien was born in Rome in the powerful family of Ruffini, although this origin is very uncertain. We do not know the date of his arrival in Normandy. During his episcopate, he would have greatly contributed to the evangelization of the diocese of Bayeux and would have ordained deacon Loup de Bayeux. On the occasion of this ordination, one of his companions named Etienne would have predicted that Wolf would be his successor. It is not known how long the episcopate of Rufinien lasted.

He was buried in the Saint-Exupère church in Bayeux.

Rufinien is celebrated on October 25 and honored on September 5.
