= Pierre de Lévis-Mirepoix =

French bishop

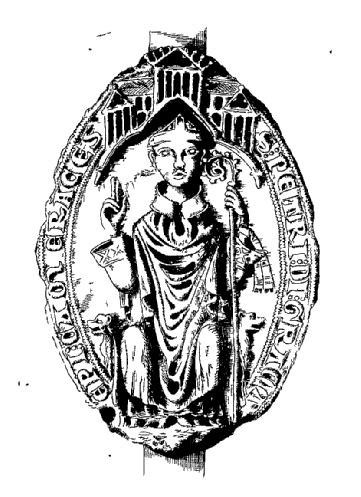
Sceau de Pierre de Lévis-Mirepoix.

Pierre de Lévis-Mirepoix who died in Bayeux on July 21, 1330, was a French prelate of the fourteenth century.

== Biography ==
He is the son of Guy III de Lévis, Lord of Mirepoix, and Isabelle de Marly.>

=== bishopric of Maguelone ===
Pope Clement V, by a bull of January 22, 1306, appoints him to the bishopric of Maguelone. In the first year of his episcopate, arrested and imprison all the Jews in his diocese. Their property is confiscated for the benefit of the French monarch.

On February 22, 1309, Pope Clement V visited him in Montpellier and the following April, transferred him to the bishopric of Cambrai.

=== bishop of Cambrai ===
Pierre went to the emperor in 1309 to receive his investiture. During his time in cambrai Pierre de Lévis

- recognizes the monastery of Vicogne.
- He held several diocesan synods, the first of which took place in Valenciennes in 1310, and where he approved that which the chapter held the previous year, in the small town of Lécluse, near Arleux. The most important of these synods is that of October 1301, in the church of Saint-Martin du Cateau.
- In 1313, Pierre de Lévis transferred the relics of Saint Waurtru.
- In 1319, King Philippe le Long sent him to Auvergne to ask for the money he needed to support the war against the Flemings. Pierre in 1323 blesses the churchin Douai, of the new convent of the Trinitarians.

=== bishopric of Bayeux ===
The riots and the popular seditions in Cambrai cause Pierre de Lévis to ask for another diocese. A bull from Pope John XXII transferred him to the bishopric of Bayeux, which he took possession of in 1324.
