= Bayeux Cathedral =

Medieval church in Normandy, France

Cathedral of Our Lady of Bayeux Cathédrale Notre-Dame de Bayeux
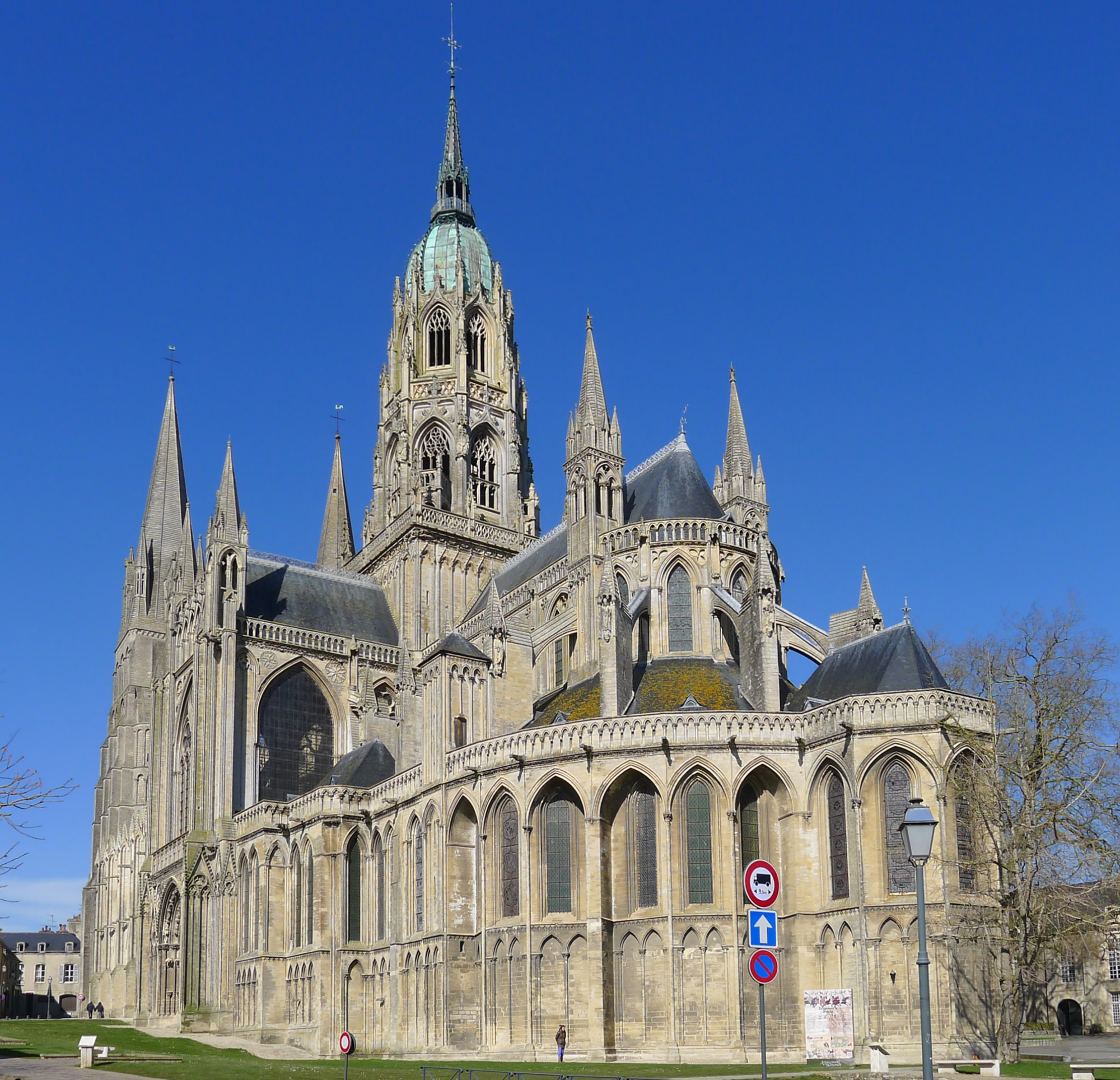
- Bayeux Cathedral in 2014
- Cathedral of Our Lady of Bayeux; Cathédrale Notre-Dame de Bayeux
- 49°16′32″N 0°42′12″W
- Location: Bayeux, France
- Denomination: Roman Catholic Church
- Churchmanship: Roman

History
- Status: Cathedral
- Consecrated: 1077

Architecture
- Architectural type: Church
- Style: Norman-Romanesque, Gothic
- Groundbreaking: 1180; 846 years ago
- Completed: 2019; 7 years ago

Specifications
- Height: 76.6

Administration
- District: Diocese of Bayeux and Lisieux

Monument historique
- Official name: Cathédrale Notre-Dame de Bayeux
- Type: Classé
- Designated: 1862
- Reference no.: PA00111042

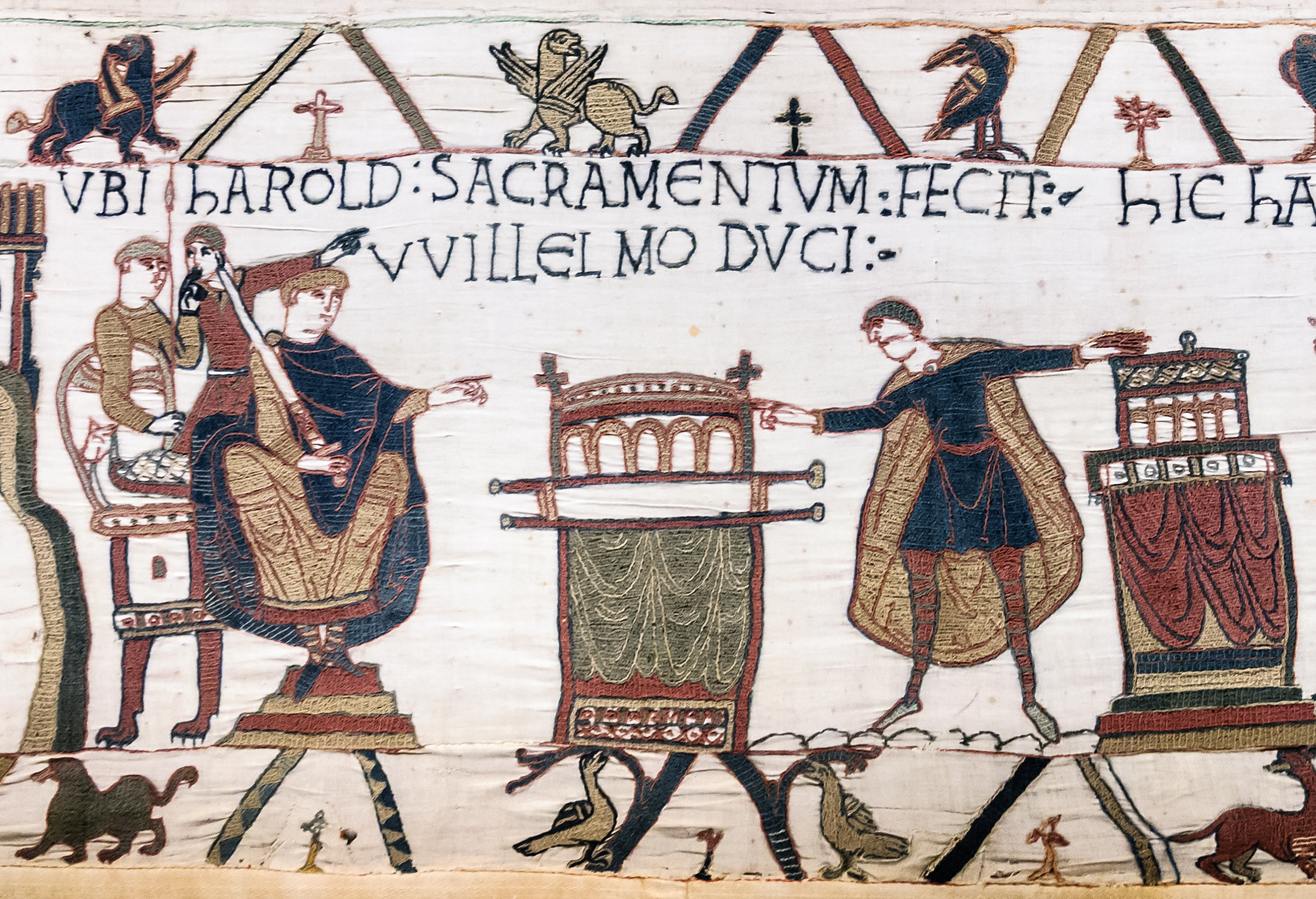
VBI HAROLD SACRAMENTVM FECIT VVILLELMO DVCI ('Where Harold made an oath to Duke William'). This scene, which is stated in the previous scene on the Tapestry to have taken place at Bagia (Bayeux, very likely in Bayeux Cathedral), shows Harold touching two altars with the enthroned Duke looking on, and is central to understanding the Norman Conquest of England. (from the Bayeux Tapestry)

Bayeux Cathedral, also known as Cathedral of Our Lady of Bayeux (French: Cathédrale Notre-Dame de Bayeux), is a Roman Catholic cathedral located in Bayeux in Normandy, France. It is the seat of the Bishop of Bayeux and Lisieux and was the original home of the Bayeux Tapestry, still preserved nearby. Constructed on the site of Roman ruins, the present cathedral was consecrated on 14 July 1077 in the presence of William, Duke of Normandy by his half-brother, Bishop Odo of Bayeux. The cathedral is considered to be one of the greatest examples of Norman-Romanesque and Gothic architectural tradition in Europe and has been listed as a Monument historique since 1862.

== History ==
Little is known about the exact appearance of the pre-Romanesque episcopal buildings in Bayeux. According to tradition, the first bishop of Bayeux, Exuperius, founded an ecclesiastical quarter in the Roman Forum, in which three churches were erected: one became the present-day cathedral; the second, dedicated to Saint Stephen, remained at the east end of the cathedral until the 17th century; the third, Saint-Sauveur, gave its name to the parish. In the late 9th century, two of the three Carolingian churches were destroyed by Vikings and a new building hastily erected by Rollo, Count of Rouen on the site of the largest church, burned down again in 1046. Hugh II of Bayeux decided to rebuild the cathedral the same year, and the building was completed in 1080 by his successor, Odo of Bayeux, half-brother of William the Conqueror. It was on this site that William may have forced Harold Godwinson to take an oath of support to him, the breaking of which led to the Norman Conquest of England. To coincide with the consecration of the almost-complete cathedral in 1077, the Bayeux Tapestry, created in Canterbury, was likely first installed and displayed inside the cathedral following the ceremony.

After a fire severely damaged the building in 1105 during a siege by Henry I of England, Richard of Dover ordered a complete rebuilding of the cathedral. Construction began around 1120 and was completed relatively quickly with the reconstruction of the lower sections of the nave, and addition of geometric motifs on the walls, typical of Norman Romanesque architecture. However, this cathedral would burn down again in 1160 shortly after completion. Reconstruction of the fourth cathedral began in 1180 and continued under Thomas de Fréauville. Modifications included the retirement of the old Romanesque style in favor for the new Gothic architecture style spreading around Europe at the time, and removal of the clerestory for a large triforium. The old barrel vault was also replaced by a new expanded rib vault with pointed roofing on the north and south transepts. Between 1245-1255, the upper parts of the nave were rebuilt in Rayonnant Gothic style, following the elimination of the triforium in favor of large bays and stained glass windows. Despite the invasion of Bayeux by Edward III in 1335, the cathedral survived the attack, albeit with light structural damage.

During the outbreak of the first French War of Religion during the late 16th century, the cathedral was sacked by local Calvinists led by François de Briqueville, leader of the Protestant party in Normandy. The statues, choir stalls and organs were destroyed, as well as the relics in the treasury. During the early 18th century, restoration would commence under Jacques Mossard, and modifications included a new rood screen installed in 1700 and the installation of a classical-style dome on the central tower in 1713-1714. However, further looting occurred during the French Revolution, and the cathedral was closed and turned into a Temple of Reason. The Bayeux Tapestry was also subsequently confiscated by the state in 1792 and moved out of the city for safekeeping. In 1851, after falling into disrepair due to decades of severe neglect, architect Eugène Viollet-le-Duc expressed concerns about the structural integrity of certain parts of the cathedral, believing that the building was structurally unstable and was at imminent risk of collapse. His proposals included extensive modifications to both the interior and exterior of the building, such as Neo-Gothic decorative additions and the demolishing of the rood screen and central tower. Despite widespread unpopularity of the plan both from the town and local engineers, the classical dome was ultimately dismantled, but the rest of the building were preserved after protest from civil engineer Eugène Flachat.

Unlike other churches in the area such as Reims and Noyon, Bayeux was largely spared from destruction during World War I, preserving the Medieval town and cathedral. During World War II, Bayeux Cathedral served as a navigation point for Allied troops during Operation Overlord, and thus was not as heavily bombed as other cities in Normandy. Following the end of the war, restorations continued steadily, and in order to accommodate changes in worship and after a recommendation from Second Vatican Council, a temporary wooden structure was built at the crossing of the transept. After three failed projects since the 1990s, the permanent structure was finally completed in 2019 under Cyril Boucaud, a Parisian heritage architect.

== Architecture ==
Following serious damage to the cathedral in the 12th century, the cathedral was rebuilt in Gothic style which is most notable in the crossing tower, transepts and east end. However, despite the crossing tower having been started in the 15th century, it was not completed until the 19th century.

== Gallery ==
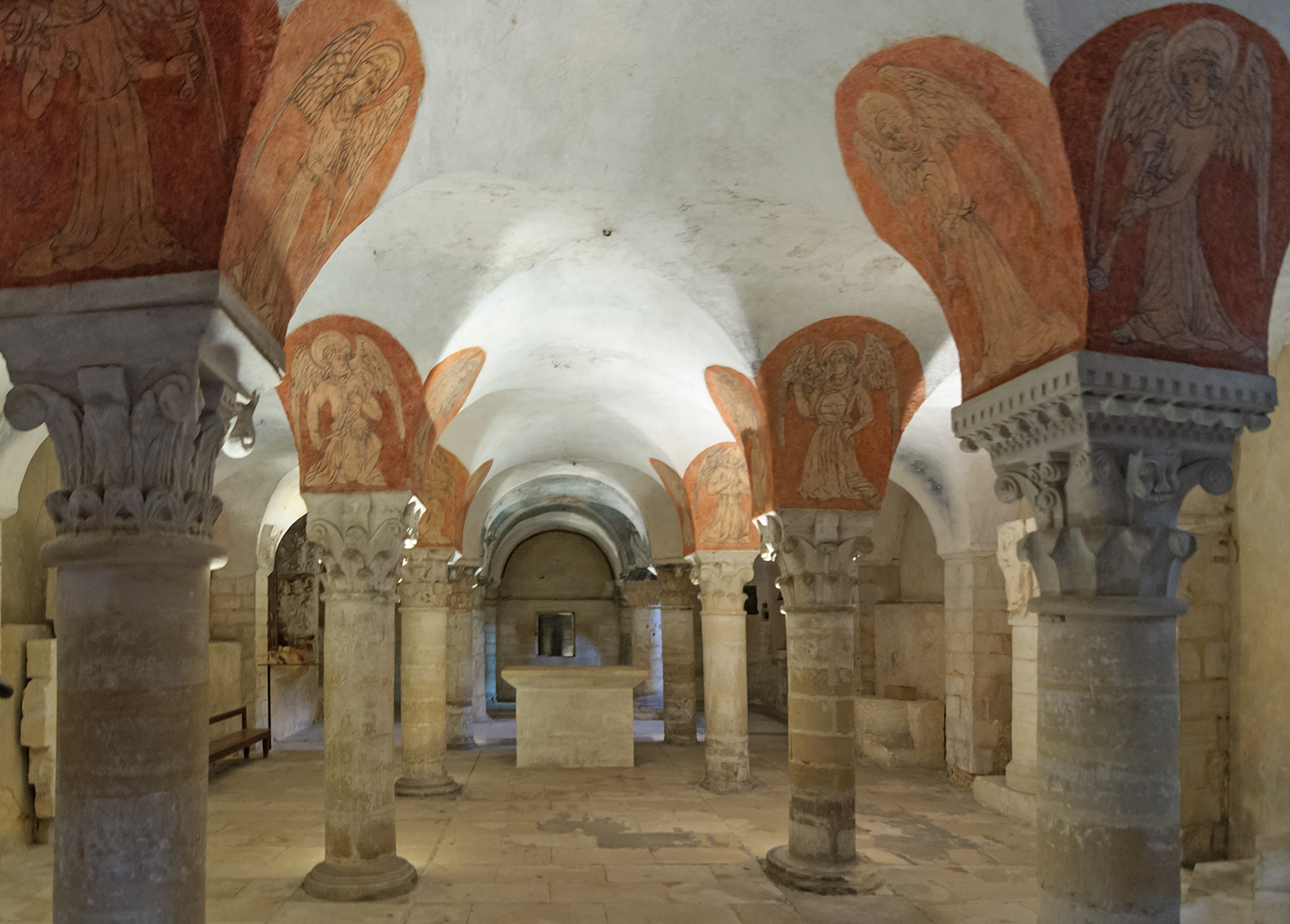
Notre Dame de Bayeux crypt

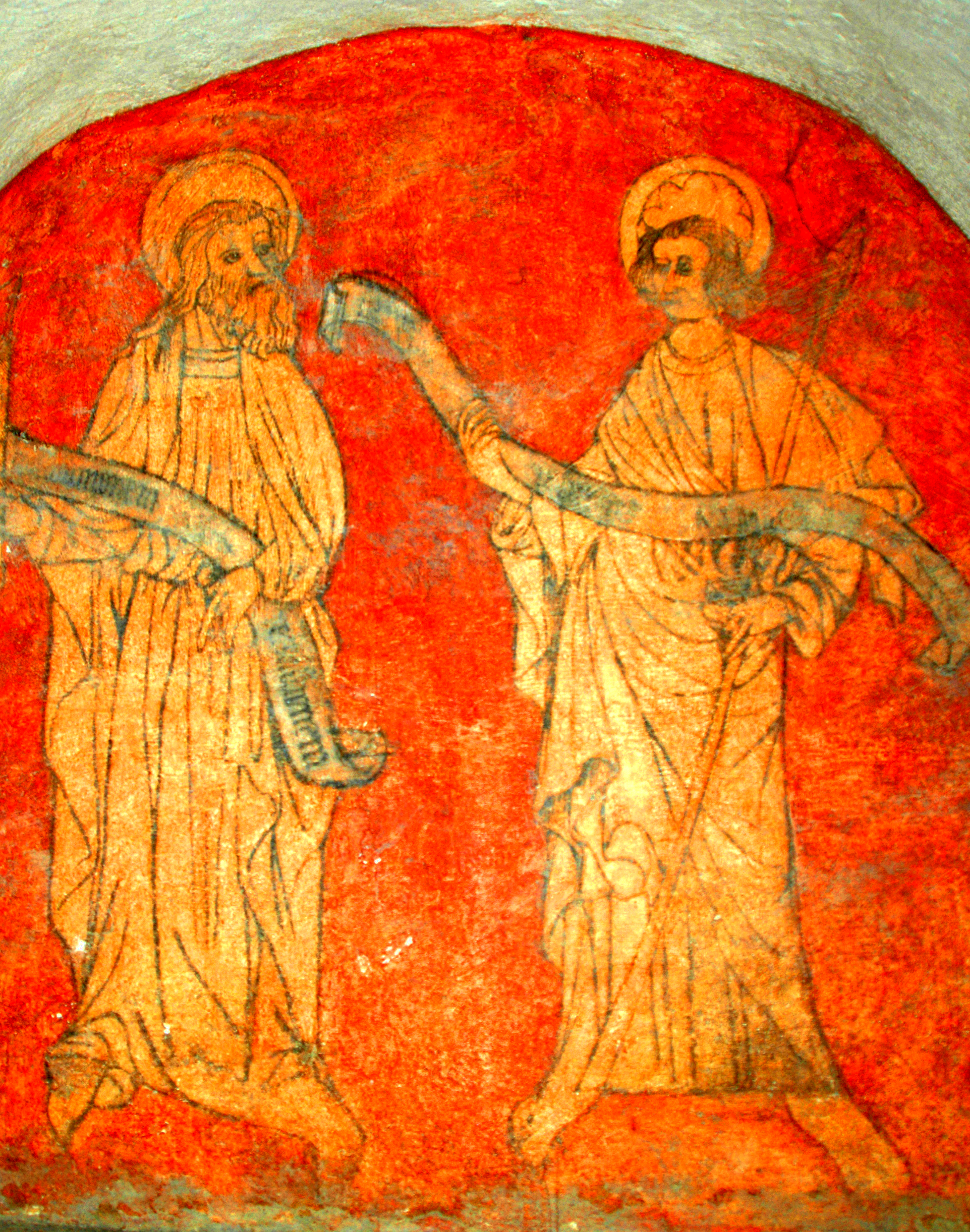
A mural in the crypt

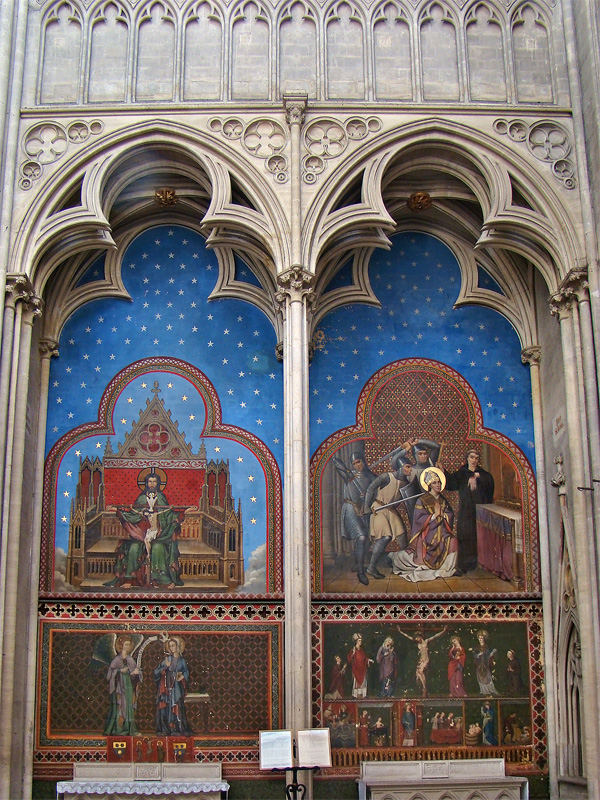
Chapels, south arm of transept

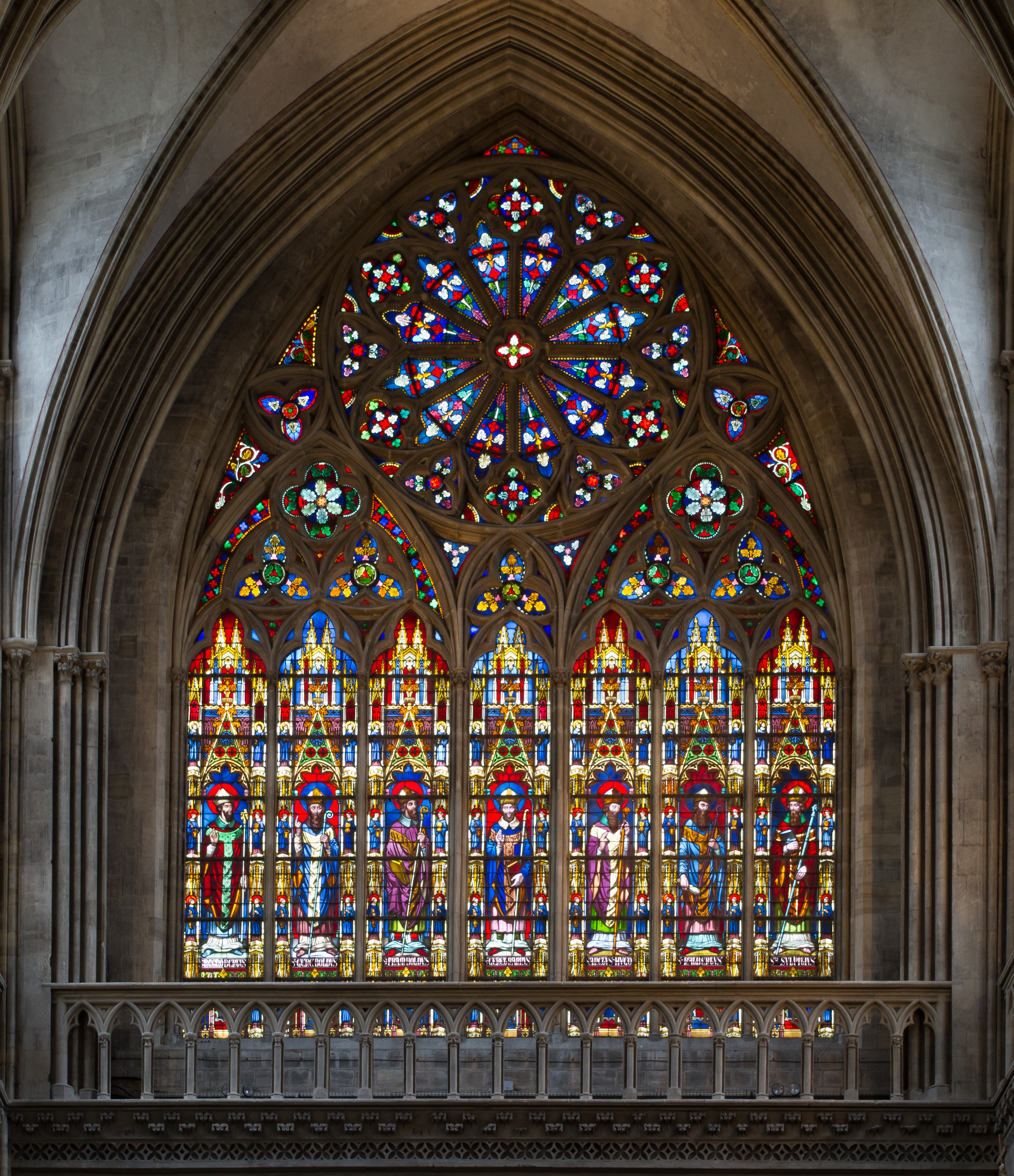
Stained-glass window, north arm of transept

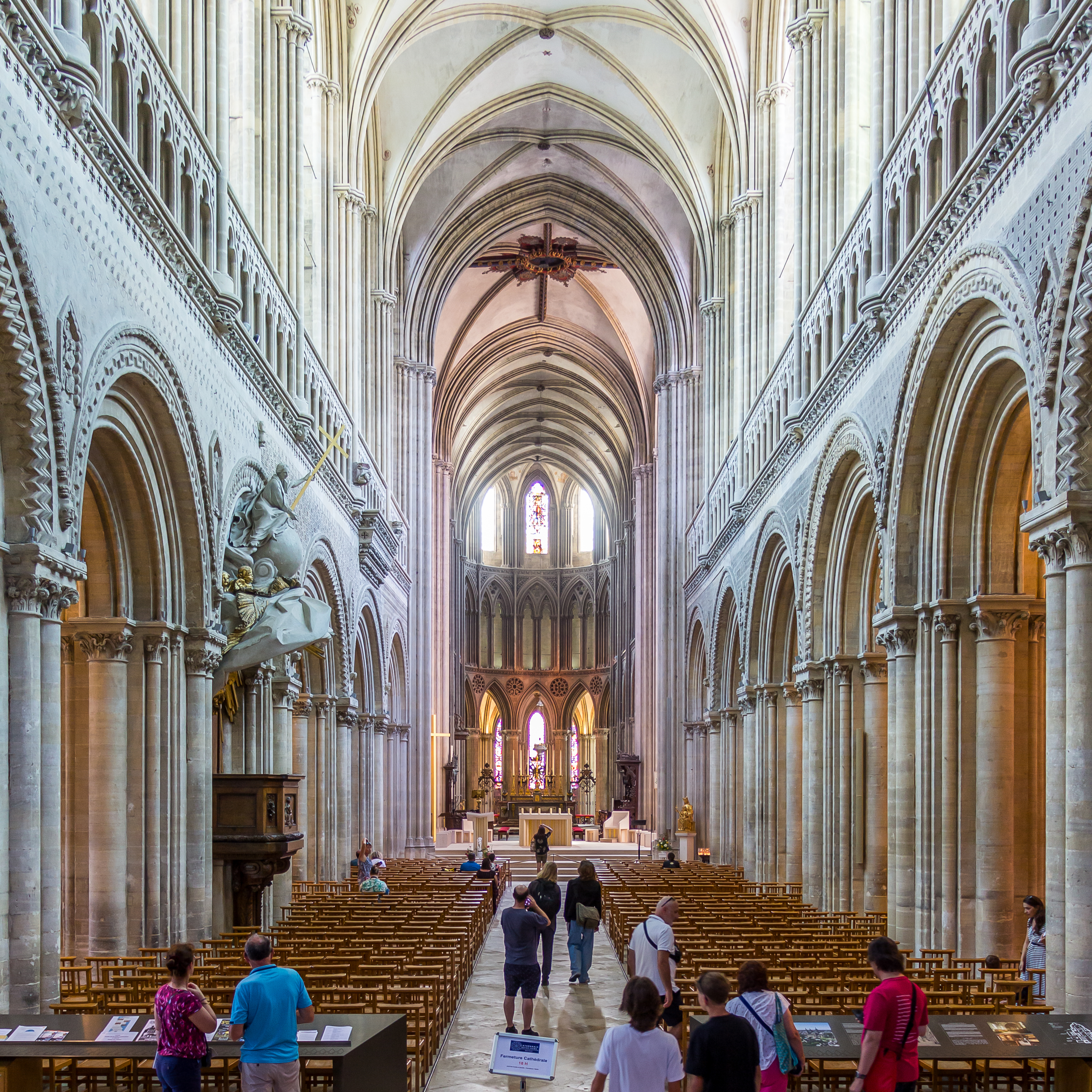
Nave from rear

== See also ==
- Roman Catholic Marian churches
