= Dungeons 4 =

- Developer: Realmforge Studios
- Publisher: Kalypso Media
- Series: Dungeons
- Engine: Unity
- Platforms: Windows, Nintendo Switch, PlayStation 5, Xbox Series X/S
- Release: WW: November 9, 2023
- Genres: Strategy, simulation, dungeon management
- Modes: Single-player, multiplayer

Dungeons 4 is a strategy simulation video game developed by Realmforge Studios and published by Kalypso Media. It was released on November 9, 2023, for Windows, PlayStation 5 and Xbox Series X/S, with a Nintendo Switch version released, on the 17th of October 2024.

It is the fourth game in the Dungeons series, the sequel to Dungeons 3 and second overall to be released on all modern platforms.

== Gameplay ==
Dungeons 4 follows a similar formula to previous games, where the player will alternate between attempting to trap heroes in their dungeon, and warring against the overworld above.

== Reception ==
Reception

Aggregate scores
Aggregator	Score
Metacritic	(PC) 76/100
OpenCritic	80% recommend

Review scores
Publication	Score
4Players	72%
GameStar	74/100
PCGamesN	7/10

Dungeons 4 received "generally favorable" reviews according to review aggregator website Metacritic, for the PC platform. Fellow review aggregator OpenCritic assessed that the game received strong approval, being recommended by 80% of critics.
