= Car Park Capital =

2026 video game

- Developer: Hilkojj Interactive
- Publisher: MicroProse
- Designer: Hilko Janssen
- Programmer: Hilko Janssen
- Artist: Hilko Janssen
- Composer: Kent Kercher
- Platform: Windows
- Release: Early access; October 9, 2026
- Genre: Construction and management simulation
- Mode: Single-player

Car Park Capital is an upcoming construction and management simulation video game developed, designed and programmed by Hilko Janssen. It is being published by MicroProse.

In the game, players are tasked with bringing car dependency to various locations. This is done by building parking lots, car carousels, and propaganda billboards, among other things.
