= Dungeon Keeper 3 =

Dungeon Keeper 3: War for the Overworld
- Developer: Bullfrog Productions
- Publisher: Electronic Arts
- Designers: Ernest W. Adams; Nick Ricks; Zy Nicholson; Nick Goldsworthy
- Series: Dungeon Keeper
- Platform: Microsoft Windows
- Release: Cancelled
- Genres: Real-time strategy, god game
- Modes: Single-player, multiplayer

Dungeon Keeper 3: War for the Overworld is a cancelled PC strategy game by Bullfrog Productions for Microsoft Windows. Dungeon Keeper 3 was set to be the next installment in the Dungeon Keeper franchise. Players were charged with managing evil creatures in an underground dungeon and protecting it against the stereotypical righteous and goodly adventurers that conventionally appear in role-playing video games. The series won praise from reviewers for its innovative design and devilish humor. The sequel to Dungeon Keeper, and Dungeon Keeper 2, it was set to lead the player to do battle in the surface realm of the goodly heroes. A short trailer for the game is included in Dungeon Keeper 2.

War for the Overworld, a game inspired by Dungeon Keeper 3, was released in 2015. This originated as a fan endeavour to develop the third game in the franchise, with the developers moving away from the Dungeon Keeper IP in 2011.

== History ==
High-level conceptualisation and design documentation formally began after the release of Dungeon Keeper 2 in June 1998, with a small design team drawn from the same development staff. Game designer and scriptwriter Zy Nicholson resigned from the studio in late 1999 and was replaced on the project by Ernest W. Adams. Though never officially announced by publisher EA, development was acknowledged by a website update from the DK3 team in early February 2000. Development was cancelled in March 2000, though it was not until August of the same year that Bullfrog Productions revealed that the game had been cancelled. At the time, Bullfrog's website explained that it had cancelled production to work on other projects:

A third episode of the Dungeon Keeper saga was underway, but opportunities to develop new intellectual properties on new platforms such as PlayStation 2 have meant that DK3 has been put on hold. There are currently no plans for another Dungeon Keeper game, however it remains an important franchise and there may be opportunities for us to pursue that direction in the future.

The projects that provoked Dungeon Keeper 3's cancellation were EA's Harry Potter and Lord of the Rings games.

== See also ==
- Dungeon Keeper (2014)
- War for the Overworld
