= DK3 (disambiguation) =

DK3 is the third and final studio album by American R&B/pop group Danity Kane.

DK3 may also refer to:

== Media ==
- The Dark Knight III: The Master Race, a nine-issue DC Comics limited series
- The Denison/Kimball Trio, jazz/post-rock side project by members of The Jesus Lizard

== Video games ==
- Donkey Kong 3, the third video game in the original 'Donkey Kong' series by Nintendo
- Dungeon Keeper 3, a cancelled PC strategy game by Bullfrog Productions

== Transportation ==
- Droga krajowa nr 3, a national road in Poland
