= Dungeons 2 =

2015 video game

- Developer: Realmforge Studios
- Publisher: Kalypso Media
- Series: Dungeons
- Engine: Unity
- Platforms: Microsoft Windows, OS X, Linux, PlayStation 4
- Release: Steam: WW: April 24, 2015; Retail: NA: April 28, 2015; PlayStation 4: NA: May 24, 2016; EU: May 27, 2016
- Genres: Strategy, simulation, dungeon management
- Modes: Single-player, multiplayer

Dungeons 2 is a strategy simulation video game developed by Realmforge Studios and published by Kalypso Media. It has been released through retail and on Steam on April 24, 2015. It is the sequel to Dungeons.

== Gameplay ==
Dungeons 2 is a more direct homage to Dungeon Keeper than its predecessor. The player still takes on the role of the Ultimate Evil, but now as a disembodied spirit after his defeat by heroes of the Overworld. The player must rely on controlling minions with the Hand of Terror. Named minions are hired, and can be leveled up and trained to be more powerful. The player must meet the needs of the minions in order to keep them happy, or they may disobey commands.

The player has to build the dungeon by selecting blocks for the minions to excavate. Rooms can be built onto empty spaces, but blocks can be filled back in as well to wall off an area. Some of the resources like gold and mana are hidden inside stone blocks while some walls cannot be excavated.

A major change from Dungeons is that the Overworld can now be entered through the same cave exits used by heroes who raid the dungeon. Once on the Overworld, the game switches to a real-time strategy mode, allowing the player to command minions as they attack player holdings. The ultimate goal is usually the destruction of a castle, but there are other separate dungeons holding quests too.

A sarcastic omnipresent narrator narrates the Ultimate Evil's acts of vengeance or inaction, in which case it pushes the player to the right path. Humorous references to games like Dungeon Keeper, Warcraft, and fantasy series like Lord of the Rings and Game of Thrones are commonplace.

== Plot ==
The story line evolves around the Absolute Evil, fed up with the heroes of the Overworld constantly abusing his minions for experience points and stealing his gold, heads to the surface. Easily conquering the castle, the Evil is ambushed by the assembled heroes of the land and divided into three parts (the Ultimate Evil, the Chaotic Evil, the Corrupting Evil). Decades later, one of the Absolute Evil's parts, the Ultimate Evil awakens as a ghostly incorporeal version of himself, and with the aid of loyal minions, starts to rebuild his empire. On the way to punish the individual heroes and gain the alliance of other races, the Ultimate Evil learns of another faction fighting both the heroes and his own empire, the Demons led by the Chaotic Evil. Also appearing and sometimes hindering or helping the Evil are the undead and their enigmatic leader, the Corrupting Evil. The Corrupting Evil is also awakened by absorbing the life of Barthas Snow, and leads an undead army. The evil prophet leads three Evils to the Stones of Destiny and says that three Evils must be reunited as the Absolute Evil. The Corrupting Evil uses Barthas Snow as sacrifice for the ritual of reunifying three Evils and the Absolute Evil is revived. The army of three evils is allied under the control of the Absolute Evil and they totally erase remnants of the Alliance.

== Chaotic Evil ==
The Chaotic Evil is the Ultimate Evil's archenemy and one of the Absolute Evil's parts. The player must rely on controlling minions with the Hand of Chaos. Named minions can be hired, levelled up and trained to be more powerful. The player must meet the needs of the minions in order to keep them happy, or they may disobey commands. Unlike the Ultimate Evil, Demons rely on magic (the horde relies on strength). In campaign there are a few levels where the player can control the Demons, though in multiplayer there is always the option of using Demons (The Hand of Chaos controls the demons, as the Hand of Terror controls the Horde).

== Development ==
=== Downloadable content ===
Three paid DLCs and a free Halloween-themed DLC were released by Realmforge Studios for Dungeons II soon after the base game's launch. All four DLC titles are puns on the Game of Thrones TV show's name, and the titles of its source books.

- Dungeons II: A Chance of Dragons. PC release: August 6, 2015. This paid DLC has three scenario maps, and involves the threat of dragons.
- Dungeons II: A Song of Sand and Fire. PC release: September 10, 2015. This paid DLC has three scenario maps with a desert setting in blazing temperatures.

It includes new fire-based enemy variants with unique abilities. The plot involves a priestess who burns any wandering dungeon creatures.

- Dungeons II: A Game of Winter. PC release: October 15, 2015.

Unlike the other three DLCs for the base game which had only three maps each, the "A Game of Winter" DLC is more of a major add-on. It contains a fully voice acted campaign with a hefty eight scenario maps, and new soundtrack. It also adds a playable 'The Undead' faction with multiplayer support; 13 new units; 8 new room designs to build; and 2 new sandbox maps.
The storyline has inspirations from the Game of Thrones show.

- Dungeons II: A Clash of Pumpkins. PC release: October 29, 2015. This free DLC adds three Halloween themed maps to the game.

These three maps include combative pumpkins, haunted forests and dangerous penguins.

=== Port ===
The PlayStation 4 edition of Dungeons II was initially announced in February 2016 for release in Europe on April 22, 2016, and North America on April 26, 2016. It included the base game; three of the four PC DLCs called "A Chance of Dragons", "A Song of Sand and Fire", & "A Clash of Pumpkins"; and two maps called "Morningwood" & "Pixie Village" (both PC version pre-orders). But it was missing the major PC add on "A Game of Winter".

After a month's delay, it was officially ported to the PlayStation 4 as a console-exclusive on May 24, 2016, in North America, and May 27, 2016, in Europe.

== Reception ==
Reception

Aggregate score
Aggregator	Score
Metacritic	PC: 70/100; PS4: 61/100

Dungeons 2 received "mixed or average" reviews according to review aggregator website Metacritic.

For the "A Chance of Dragons" DLC, Don van Deventer from MGR Gaming thinks it is a neat, little add on, and full of lore and references from other fantasy creations. Don thought the three new maps were thrilling and exciting; and the new dragon enemies were beautifully made. However, Don wished for the scenarios to have some narration. The review rated it 7 out of 10 points.

For the "A Song of Sand and Fire" DLC, Don van Deventer from MGR Gaming criticised it & similar DLC's for lacking narration to the added missions. However, the DLC still packed a decent punch with large maps and new flame-based enemies. The review rated it 6 out of 10 points.

For the "A Game of Winter" add on, Don van Deventer from MGR Gaming enjoyed the humorous narration and the story in the campaign, and many other new things in it like the new playable army. The review rated it 8 out of 10 points.

== Sequel ==
Dungeons 3 is the sequel to Dungeons 2. It was released on October 13, 2017.
