= Ghost Master =

2003 video game by Sick Puppies

- Macintosh cover art
- Developers: Sick Puppies; Spiral House (PS2, Xbox)
- Publishers: Empire Interactive; Feral Interactive (Mac); Strategy First (Steam)
- Director: Gregg Barnett
- Producer: Andy Severn
- Designers: Chris Bateman; Gregg Barnett; Neil Bundy; Nick Martinelli
- Programmers: David Hunt; Neal Tringham
- Artists: James Ellis; Mike Philbin; Nick Martinelli
- Writers: Chris Bateman; Richard Boon
- Composer: Paul Weir
- Platforms: Windows; Mac OS; Mac OS X; PlayStation 2; Xbox
- Release: Windows; EU: May 23, 2003; NA: August 26, 2003; Mac OS & OS X; WW: 2003; PlayStation 2 & Xbox; EU: August 27, 2004; Steam; NA: December 21, 2006
- Genres: Puzzle, strategy
- Mode: Single-player

Ghost Master (released as Ghost Master: The Gravenville Chronicles on the Xbox and PlayStation 2) is a puzzle strategy game developed by British studio Sick Puppies for Windows. The game was later published on Mac OS X by Feral Interactive. The player assumes the role of a Ghost Master, a bureaucratic spirit tasked to perform certain duties. While the bulk of a Ghost Master's duties consist of hauntings, a Ghost Master may also be "called in" to increase belief in the supernatural, avenge deaths, and conscript renegade ghosts. Because a Ghost Master cannot directly interfere in the world of mortals, the Ghost Master is given a team of subordinate ghosts to do so. When not haunting, the Ghost Master is responsible for the training of the ghosts under their command. A remastered version called Ghost Master: Resurrection was released for Windows, PS5, Xbox Series X|S and Nintendo Switch on March 20, 2026.

== Gameplay ==
The game consists of 15 levels. In most levels, the primary goal is to scare all the mortals (humans) and cause them to flee the area in fear or succumb to madness.

Ghost Master plays similarly to a real-time strategy game. The player first chooses the ghosts to field in the level. The player cannot field every ghost in every place. Each ghost has one or two types of objects (or "fetters") it can be bound to. For example, a ghost who was murdered might only be bound to "murder" fetters (such as a corpse, or a murder weapon), whereas a water spirit can be bound to a bath, a sink, a puddle of water, etc. Some objects have multiple fetter types (e.g., "violence" and "murder" for the corpse of a murder victim) and some fetters are more common than others, with more powerful haunters limited to rarer fetters. Less powerful haunters can take advantage of very flexible fetters, such as "thoroughfares" (usually hallways), "indoors" or "outdoors"; several of these haunters possess abilities which permit them to change their fetter to pursue mortals (usually from one "indoor" fetter to another).

Another limiting factor is "Plasm". This numerical resource dictates which abilities a ghost can use. When a human becomes frightened, Plasm is generated. With more Plasm, stronger abilities (and more ghosts) can be fielded at any one time.

Once the objective(s) for a level has been completed, the game rates the player's performance. Many factors are considered, including time, amount of impact on the mortals, and how many mortals fled. If the player is able to complete the mission fairly quickly, there is a multiplier added to the final score. This score determines the amount of "Gold Plasm" given to the player, which is used to add more abilities to ghosts' arsenals.

The game ends with a cliffhanger, with the Ghostbreakers bringing in a bomb that would completely erase supernatural presence in the city where the game takes place. Because of the lack of a sequel, a bonus level was released for fans, which provides some closure. However, the bonus level is only available for the UK version of the game and was not released for the retail US version.

=== Bonus content ===
The bonus level is included in the Steam and GOG.com release of the game. The bonus level "Class of Spook'em High" is the only downloadable content released for the game. In the level, the Ghostbreakers attack the HQ of the Ghost Master, an old, abandoned mansion where the player has to defeat the Ghostbreakers in order to win the game. The bonus content was released in place of a sequel.

=== Restless spirits ===
Each level also has "Restless Spirits", haunters bound to a certain location; usually, there is a backstory as to why they are there. The spirits' powers can be used like any other haunter's, but they cannot be benched or bound to another fetter until freed. The player can use the haunters on their team as well as the bound spirit itself to free them using a certain move or combination of moves. For example, in the first level, the restless spirit Weatherwitch is bound to a vacuum cleaner that the player must destroy in order to free her. A freed spirit permanently joins the player's roster of haunters.

=== Mortal defenses and abilities ===
All mortals have a belief level, which partially determines the effectiveness of a ghost's powers upon them. The belief bar is raised slightly with every scare, and particular powers are able to raise belief better than others. Every mortal also has conscious and subconscious fears which are linked to certain ghost's powers. Scaring a mortal with a power that targets their individual fear – especially their subconscious fear – is particularly effective. These are usually unknown at the beginning of each level, but some ghosts have the ability to expose these fears.

Mortals also have a terror level and a madness level, with certain limits to each. When a human's terror bar is raised to a certain level, they flee; this is the objective of most of the in-game levels. The madness bar is filled only by the use of certain powers. When a mortal's madness bar reaches a certain point, they go insane, which is visible in that they now just roam the area of the scenario in a frenzy and are unable to be scared or maddened any more. The fear bar reduces as time progresses in the game, but the belief and madness bars do not. Making a mortal go insane awards more points than frightening them away.

Somewhere between average humans and ghosts are priests, witches, and mediums. These humans have the ability to banish ghosts that are fielded. Banished ghosts are no longer usable during that level, but are returned after the mission is complete. Also, a large score penalty is levied on players who allow ghosts to be banished. If all ghosts are banished, or the amount of Plasm used by fielded ghosts exceeds the Plasm limit for too long, the level must be replayed.

Ghostbreakers are the most dangerous mortals, from a supernatural perspective. They are able to detect and banish ghosts at a much faster speed than the other "special" mortals mentioned previously. They are also able to field special wards, which prevent the player from fielding, or benching, ghosts trapped underneath them. Only if the electrical generators are destroyed do the wards fail.

== Reception ==
The PC and PlayStation 2 versions received "generally favorable reviews", while the Xbox version received "mixed" reviews, according to the review aggregation website Metacritic.

GameSpot named Ghost Master the best computer game of August 2003. The staff of X-Play nominated Ghost Master for their 2003 "Best Strategy Game" award, which ultimately went to Rise of Nations.

Reception

Aggregate score
Aggregator	Score		
Aggregator	PC	PS2	Xbox
Metacritic	81/100	75/100	59/100

Review scores
Publication	Score		
Publication	PC	PS2	Xbox
Computer Gaming World	3.5/5	N/A	N/A
Edge	6/10	N/A	N/A
Eurogamer	7/10	N/A	7/10
Game Informer	7.25/10	N/A	N/A
GamePro	4/5	N/A	N/A
GameSpot	8.8/10	N/A	N/A
GameSpy	4/5	N/A	N/A
GameZone	9/10	N/A	N/A
IGN	7/10	N/A	N/A
PlayStation Official Magazine – UK	N/A	5/10	N/A
Official Xbox Magazine (UK)	N/A	N/A	7.5/10
PC Gamer (US)	90%	N/A	N/A

== See also ==
- Dungeon Keeper and Dungeon Keeper 2, video games in which the player controls hellish creatures.
- Evil Genius, a video game where the player controls an evil genius who is bent on world domination.
- Haunting Starring Polterguy, a similar 1993 comedy-horror video game.
