= Dungeon Keeper (2014 video game) =

- Developer: Mythic Entertainment
- Publisher: Electronic Arts
- Series: Dungeon Keeper
- Platforms: iOS; Android
- Release: 30 January 2014
- Genre: Strategy
- Modes: Single-player; Multiplayer

Dungeon Keeper was a freemium mobile massively multiplayer online strategy video game developed by Mythic Entertainment and released by Electronic Arts in 2014 for iOS and Android. A reboot to the Dungeon Keeper series, players construct and manage a dungeon, recruiting minions to run it, although the gameplay had a tower defence style, featuring frequent raids of others' dungeons and the defense of the player's. Players could participate in tournaments and leagues online.

The game was announced in August 2013, and the development team wanted to carry over elements from the original Dungeon Keeper games by Bullfrog Productions, especially the humor. Richard Ridings provided the voiceovers, as he did with the previous installments. The game was noted for its monetization of gameplay by relying on in-app purchases, for which it received widespread criticism. The reliance on in-app purchases also caused an outcry in the gaming public. In the UK, Electronic Arts' advertising of the game was ruled to have misled customers, which forced them to amend their adverts. Electronic Arts also faced criticism over their filtration of user reviews.

On August 9, 2022, Electronic Arts ended its support and the game became unavailable to play.

== Gameplay ==
A typical dungeon.

Unlike previous installments, the game is a tower defence game, similar to Clash of Clans. As with previous instalments, the game centres around dungeon construction and management, with players hiring and controlling minions. The dungeon heart is the life force, and its destruction ends the game. Imps are the dungeon's workforce, performing tasks such as digging tiles. Rooms have set sizes instead of being constructed by tiles, and minions are summoned manually instead of appearing at regular intervals. Which minions can be summoned depends on the dungeon's composition. Rooms include the workshop (which produces traps used to defend the dungeon) and the Dark Library. Rooms can be moved without reconstruction, and some have built-in defences against intruders. Minions include trolls and warlocks. In campaign mode, major events are triggered manually. At the start, players are given a tutorial by Horny, the Horned Reaper from the previous games. Raiding other dungeons (with the goal of the opponent's destruction) using the acquired minions is a regular occurrence, and players also frequently need to defend their dungeon from invasion. During raids, rooms can be claimed and used to deploy units.

There are three main types of resources: Gold, Stone, and Gems. Resources are used to construct rooms and traps and summon minions. Stone and Gold (stored in a treasury) are produced by Stone Quarries and Gold Mines respectively. Resources are also found in dirt tiles (dug by the Imps), of which there are three types: Soft Rock, Gem Veins, and Hard Gem Veins, taking increasing amounts of time to dig respectively. The idea of this is to keep Imps busy while the player is away, and to reward players on returning. Imps can be slapped to speed up digging, and Gems can be spent to dig tiles instantly. Gems can also be spent to produce Imps, upgrade rooms, and instantly perform other actions that take time, such as room construction, and minion summoning, and can be purchased using real money within the game. Other resources include mana (produced by the Dark Library and used to cast spells (such as Dragon Breath, which conjures a dragon)), and combat points, obtained by raiding and defending dungeons.

In multiplayer, players can be a member of a guild, a group that shares minions and cooperate towards achieving goals. Guild Tournaments, in which guilds compete for the rank of Horny's Chosen, are held. Victory stars are awarded based on players' performance in raids. If enough stars are earned, the guild qualifies for the tournament. The first five qualifying guilds enter the Horny's Chosen bracket. The other qualifying guilds enter a standard tournament. Guilds are ranked according to victory stars earned. The Horny's Chosen brackets yield greater Gem rewards than the standard tournament. Rewards are distributed to guild members according to participation. Guilds that do not win enter a lottery for a Gem payout. Another feature is the League of Evil, a ladder system in which players are ranked according to trophies earned. The higher the rank, the greater the resource bonus for performing successful raids. As players promote through the ranks, achievements with Gem rewards are unlocked, and players are given all achievements and Gem rewards up to that rank if they already qualify for a higher rank. Another event is Event Raids, in which players build defenses to withstand waves of invaders.

== Development ==
Dungeon Keeper was announced in August 2013, although development began the previous year. It was scheduled for a winter release, and designed for touchscreens. According to senior producer Jeff Skalski, Mythic Entertainment had to make significant changes to Dungeon Keeper for mobile platforms, although there were aspects of the original games from Bullfrog Productions they wanted to keep, such as the humour. The intention was to give players an experience of the original Dungeon Keeper. Despite this, he stated that they were not trying to recreate the original games, or the cancelled Dungeon Keeper 3, but rather a mobile game for mobile systems. The color palette was expanded to make the creatures easier to see on mobile phones. The role of traps was increased, and gameplay was made to focus as much on offense as defense. According to Skalski, the god-view facilitated the porting to touch-screen devices. The development team took into account feedback from fans on the internet, and their goal was to make the game free so many people could play it. Skalski emphasized that the game is built for typical mobile game patterns, which meant that it is supposed to be played for brief periods multiple times per day. He disagreed with assertions that it lacks the humour of the original, due to Richard Ridings (who, according to him, is a fan-favourite) providing the voice-overs like he did with the original Dungeon Keeper and Dungeon Keeper 2, which included over 500 lines of dialogue.

According to Nick LaMartina, director of Audio and Media, the team wanted Ridings to emote (he considered Ridings's voices in the original games flat by comparison), so the personality of Horny emerged. Ridings described working on Dungeon Keeper as "a licence to be bad", and was impressed with the scripts. According to LaMartina, the scripts contributed to how good the game sounded. Many people, including himself, the creative director, the producer, and the community manager, contributed to the scripts. LaMartina stated that the collaborative effort is what made Horny the character he is.

Electronic Arts soft launched the game for Android in Canada and Australia in October 2013. The game was released worldwide free of charge on the ITunes Store for iOS and Google Play for Android on 30 January 2014, and Electronic Arts described the game as "a 'twisted' take" on Bullfrog's game. The game was highly anticipated by fans of the originals.

== Reception ==
Reception

Aggregate score
Aggregator	Score
Metacritic	42/100

Review scores
Publication	Score
4Players	1%
Destructoid	4/10
Eurogamer	1/10
GameZone	3/10
IGN	3/10
Jeuxvideo.com	6/20
MacLife	4/5
Pocket Gamer	3.5/5
TouchArcade	1/5
USgamer	1/5
Digital Spy	2/5
The Escapist	0.5/5

Dungeon Keeper received "generally unfavourable reviews" according to the review aggregation website Metacritic. In particular, critics condemned the time the Gem Veins take to dig, forcing players to either wait or purchase Gems with real money. Leif Johnson of IGN heavily criticized the heavy reliance on in-app purchases and waiting times that were not present in the original game. Dan Whitehead of Eurogamer criticized the game for being a Clash of Clans clone as well its reliance on microtransactions, and commented that Dungeon Keeper had gone free-to-play in a "soulless" way. James Stephanie Sterling of The Escapist echoed these sentiments, describing the game as "One of the worst examples of a cancer that is eroding the market", and also criticizing the "babyish" characters and the lack of dark humour and appeal of the original game. Lespol of Jeuxvideo.com described the game as "Outrageous", and criticized the difficulty of playing without paying, as well as the behavior of the units when confronting the enemy, although they commented that some of the humor of the original game is present. Scott Nichols of Digital Spy criticized the waiting times and commented that they render the invasions inadequate for game worth. Julian "Jaz" Rignall of USgamer initially complimented the graphics and gameplay, but described the game as "a sad, knock-off of a wannabe, faux-Dungeon Keeper" due to the free-to-play business model. Miguel Concepcion of TabTimes heavily criticized the waiting times and how quickly the game asks for payment. Shaun Musgrave of TouchArcade stated that fans of the original games would be unhappy with the simplification and monetization. David Jenkins of Metro gave it a zero, stating, "Dungeon Keeper is not a video game, not any more. Instead it's just a virtual beggar, constantly demanding your spare change and offering nothing in return." Peter Molyneux, creator of the original Dungeon Keeper, described the waiting times and capitalization as "ridiculous", and criticized Electronic Arts for getting the balance wrong.

Reception was not universally negative. Chris Carter of Destructoid gave a mediocre review. Although he criticized the waiting times and microtransactions, he commented that raiding other dungeons can be fun. Harry Slater of Pocket Gamer described the game as a "well polished Clash of Clans clone", although he criticized the waiting times. Nathan Meunier of MacLife lauded the "addictive" construction and "wacky" humour, but criticized the frequency of in-app purchases. David Oxford of Slide to Play described the game as "not too bad" for a freemium game employing in-app purchases. Stephen Yuen of AndroidSPIN stated in an early review that the Android version needs patience, but praised the graphics and sound.

=== Controversies ===
In addition to strong criticism from reviewers, the game caused outcry from the gaming public. British newspaper The Independent stated that the game's use of microtransactions made it "unplayable". At one point, the outrage was dismissed as the players playing incorrectly. In February 2014, Electronic Arts was accused of censoring user ratings lower than five stars by making those players email them instead. Electronic Arts claimed the practice facilitated feedback, but was criticized for making players claim to give the highest rating in order to give one. The practice was criticized for giving an impression of popularity. Electronic Arts claimed that the outcry was mainly due to players' nostalgia for the original games, and pointed out that there were many players who did not have such criticisms.

In July 2014, the British Advertising Standards Authority ruled that Electronic Arts' advertising that the game is free misled customers, ordered the addition of fine print explaining about in-app purchases, and banned the original adverts. Electronic Arts counter-claimed that in-app purchases are not mandatory and that Gems are obtainable in-game. Responding to the public criticisms, Andrew Wilson of Electronic Arts admitted that they "misjudged the economy", and resolved to learn from them. He also stated that they failed to deliver value. Peter Molyneux stated that they forgot about Dungeon Keeper's spirit, and expressed regret at not offering his input on the game, despite being consulted by the developers. Electronic Arts' head of mobile, Frank Gibeau, also stated that they "innovated too much". Shamus Young of The Escapist cited Electronic Arts' lack of understanding of the market and game design, and poor public relations as reasons the game was not successful.

== See also ==
- List of video games notable for negative reception
