= Dyson Sphere Program =

Factory simulation game

- Developer: Youthcat Studio
- Publisher: Gamera Games
- Engine: Unity
- Platform: Windows
- Release: January 21, 2021 (early access)
- Genre: Factory simulation
- Mode: Single-player

Dyson Sphere Program is an upcoming factory simulation game developed by Youthcat Studio and published by Gamera Games. It was released in early access in January 2021 for Windows on Steam and WeGame.

Players are tasked with providing power to a supercomputer by harvesting resources to create an expanding, interstellar network of automated factories, with the ultimate goal of constructing a Dyson sphere. The early access version of the game has been met with generally positive reception, with praise for the gameplay loop and graphics and criticism towards the start of the game and user interface. It has been favorably compared to other games in the genre, including Factorio and Satisfactory.

== Gameplay ==
A mediterranean-class planet with power generator units

Dyson Sphere Program is a sandbox factory simulation game that takes place in a science fiction setting where human consciousness is digitized and uploaded to a supercomputer known as the 'Centrebrain'. The player, controlling a customizable mecha named 'Icarus', is sent to an alien planet by the group 'COSMO', tasked with constructing infrastructure to generate power for the supercomputer. Players must create an interstellar network of factories to collect and use minerals from nearby planetary systems, with the ultimate goal of creating a Dyson sphere, a structure that is capable of capturing all of a star's energy output by completely encapsulating it.

Factories consist of automated harvesting machinery, electrical infrastructure, and assembly lines, all connected through a series of conveyor belts. Players begin by manually harvesting materials, such as stone, iron ore, and copper, and create structures to automate resource collection and refinement as well as the manufacture of components, additional structures, and items. Factory layouts are incentivized to be efficient in order to minimize manual labor and to achieve optimal throughput and flow of resources; to this end, all buildings can be deconstructed and placed again to redesign factories. Structures must be powered through electric generators, such as wind turbines, thermal power stations, solar panels, and artificial stars. The mecha itself requires fuel, such as plant materials and hydrogen.

Items called 'matrices' can be manufactured and consumed by research laboratories, which furthers progression through a technology tree to upgrade and unlock various structures and abilities needed to expand and automate the factory. Upgrading the mecha unlocks the ability to travel to other varieties of planets and stars in order to collect new resources unavailable on the starting planet. Interstellar and planetary logistics systems allow drones to transfer resources to player factories across the star system, expanding industrial operations through magnitudes of planetary scale. Factory expansion and research continues until components for the Dyson sphere are finally constructed and launched into their target orbit.

With the "Rise of the Dark Fog" update, players must additionally defend their factories against periodic attacks from a hostile non-player character (NPC) faction named the 'Dark Fog'. Various structures, including turrets and energy shields, can be constructed to defeat Dark Fog assaults.

== Development ==
Dyson Sphere Program was developed by the five-member team of Youthcat Studio, located in Chongqing, China. The studio was started by Mao Mao, a graduate from Chongqing University, and Zhou Xun, who was already working in the games industry. The two had met previously and had a shared interest in science fiction. They drew inspiration from the space-based 4X game Stellaris, which included the construction of Dyson spheres as part of its gameplay, and had conceptualized a game about building a Dyson sphere piece by piece. Inspired by the 2019 Chinese science-fiction film The Wandering Earth, Mao Mao and Xun began work on their science-fiction game concept in April of that year. They spent several months prototyping the concept before committing towards full-time game development. Xun quit his job to form Youthcat Studio with Mao Mao, and they hired three additional developers to help. The project was funded with Xun's own savings, giving them a maximum two-year window to prepare the game for a release state. Near mid-2020, as they were approaching the end of this two-year period, they met with Gamera Games, a Chinese publisher that supports indie game development. Gamera helped Youthcat with planning for an international release of the title and enlisting voice actors who had been in The Wandering Earth to perform for the game.

The National Press and Publication Administration of China approved Dyson Sphere Program on September 21, 2020, and the game was launched in early access on Steam and WeGame on January 21, 2021. Youthcat Studio said their intention was to have about a year of development in the early access period before considering the game complete. In January 2022, the game received an update which let players customize the appearance of their mecha. In December 2023, the "Rise of the Dark Fog" update introduced a non-player character (NPC) hostile enemy faction, which periodically attacks the player's factories, and added various player-constructed structures to defend against assaults. Other updates to the game included reassignable keybinds and improvements to construction.

== Reception ==
Within four days of entering early access, Youthcat reported that they had sold over 200,000 copies and had sold over 350,000 by the first week. It was the top-selling game on Steam the week of its debut. By September 2021, sales had reached over 1.7 million units.

The early access version of Dyson Sphere Program has been met with generally positive reception and compared favorably to other factory simulation games, including Factorio and Satisfactory. PC Gamer praised it as "extremely polished" for an early access game. Rock Paper Shotgun drew criticism towards the user interface, but praised the graphics and the real-time lighting, listing Dyson Sphere Program as part of their favorite games of 2021 and calling it "a must-play for factory game fans." Polygon praised the gameplay loop of constructing and redesigning efficient factory layouts, but criticized the initial setup of the factory as slow, with lots of "grunt work". GameSpot included the game on their list of best sandbox games in 2025.
