= Dungeons (video game) =

2011 video game

- Cover art
- Developer: Realmforge Studios
- Publisher: Kalypso Media
- Director: Benjamin Rauscher
- Designer: Christian Wolfertstetter
- Programmer: Korbinian Abenthum
- Artists: Alexander Schonka, Joachim Segler
- Engine: OGRE
- Platform: Microsoft Windows
- Release: DE: January 27, 2011; NA: February 10, 2011
- Genres: Strategy, simulation, dungeon management
- Mode: Single-player

Dungeons is a strategy/simulation video game developed by Realmforge Studios and published by Kalypso Media. It was announced August 12, 2010, and was released on January 27, 2011, in Germany and February 10, 2011, in North America.

== Gameplay ==
Although similar to the Dungeon Keeper series, Dungeons differs in that the purpose is to care for heroes and not monsters. In order to gain the Soul Energy needed to purchase high-end equipment for the dungeon, heroes need to be killed only after they are fully satisfied. Heroes are pleased if they, for example, find treasure or fight challenging, but not overpowering opponents. Unlike Dungeon Keeper, the player also has an on screen avatar, the Dungeon Lord, who can teleport bodies to the prison room to have their Soul Energy harvested or roam the dungeon defeating heroes. He will re-spawn at the dungeon heart if he is slain, at the cost of the dungeon heart's health points.

== Reception ==
Reception

Aggregate score
Aggregator	Score
Metacritic	65/100

Review score
Publication	Score
PC PowerPlay	5/10

Dungeons received "mixed or average" reviews according to review aggregator Metacritic. Critics noted that the game was more about taking care of the heroes rather than your own creatures, in contrast to the Dungeon Keeper series. However, GameSpot panned the game as having "mind-numbing, repetitive gameplay."

== Addon ==
A standalone addon and sequel called Dungeons - The Dark Lord was announced in early June 2011, and released in September 23, 2011.

The sequel's singleplayer campaign has a mirror perspective to the first game and casts the player as the female character, Calypso, who has to fight against her former boyfriend, Dark Lord. Several other playable characters are also included and equipped with their own spells and abilities.

The release added multiplayer modes for up to four players, and mod support. Some of the multiplayer modes are survival, deathmatch and "king of the middle" (a king of the hill style control in middle of the dungeon). The singleplayer side includes sandbox, tycoon-style amusement park and survival modes.

=== Reception ===
In Gamona's review, Roland Peters rated The Dark Lord expansion 72%, and said while the campaign was weak and too difficult compared to the original, the addition of skirmish and multiplayer modes was very well liked. The new features like in-game gimmicks are well thought out, and that the increase in environmental variety was praised.

== Sequels ==
A sequel, Dungeons 2, was announced as an easter egg in Dark in July 2013. It was released on April 24, 2015, for Microsoft Windows, OS X and SteamOS.

Dungeons 3 is the sequel to Dungeons 2, released on October 13, 2017.

Dungeons 4 released on November 9, 2023.

== See also ==
- Dungeon Keeper
