= IBM CityOne =

2010 video game

- Developer(s): IBM
- Publisher(s): IBM
- Platform(s): Browser
- Release: October 4, 2010
- Genre(s): Construction and management simulation games

IBM CityOne or IBM INNOV8: CityOne is a city-building simulation game, introduced on May 4, 2010 by IBM at its in-house software conference Impact 2010. It was released on October 4, 2010.
