= The TV That Made Me =

- Presented by: Brian Conley
- Country of origin: United Kingdom
- Original language: English
- No. of seasons: 2
- No. of episodes: 40

Production
- Running time: 45 minutes

Original release
- Network: BBC One
- Release: 3 August 2015 – 1 April 2016

The TV That Made Me is a daytime television show, presented by Brian Conley. It was first broadcast on BBC One from 3 August 2015 to 1 April 2016.

== Format ==
Brian Conley journeys through the world of television with various celebrities as they choose the TV moments that have shaped their lives. Each episode contains set categories such as; 'earliest TV memory', 'guilty pleasure' and 'watch with mother'.

The show aired daily at 3.45pm on BBC One, as part of the weekday afternoon schedule. As of the second series, the programme then featured a live studio audience. Between 22 June - 15 August 2017, all 40 editions of both series were aired at 6.00am on BBC Two in a revised format on weekday mornings. This time all the shows remained from their usual 45-minute versions to a heavily edited 30 minute timeslot.

== Episodes ==
Series 1

1. Eamonn Holmes (3 August 2015)
2. Sandi Toksvig (4 August 2015)
3. Natalie Cassidy (5 August 2015)
4. Jo Wood (6 August 2015)
5. Linford Christie (7 August 2015)
6. Rory McGrath (10 August 2015)
7. Carol Kirkwood (11 August 2015)
8. Lesley Joseph (12 August 2015)
9. Helen Skelton (13 August 2015)
10. Gok Wan (14 August 2015)
11. Pam Ayres (17 August 2015)
12. Stephen K. Amos (18 August 2015)
13. Adil Ray (19 August 2015)
14. Ann Widdecombe (20 August 2015)
15. Martin Roberts (21 August 2015)
16. Gyles Brandreth (24 August 2015)
17. Penny Smith (25 August 2015)
18. Vanessa Feltz (26 August 2015)
19. Duncan Bannatyne (27 August 2015)
20. Rebecca Adlington (28 August 2015)

Series 2

1. John Thomson (7 March 2016)
2. Esther Rantzen (8 March 2016)
3. John Prescott (9 March 2016)
4. Nina Wadia (10 March 2016)
5. Mariella Frostrup (11 March 2016)
6. John Hannah (13 March 2016)
7. Alison Hammond (15 March 2016)
8. Johnny Ball (16 March 2016)
9. Alex Jones (17 March 2016)
10. Joe Swash (18 March 2016)
11. Myleene Klass (21 March 2016)
12. Richard Ridings (22 March 2016)
13. Paul Martin (23 March 2016)
14. Kirsty Wark (24 March 2016)
15. Amanda Abbington (25 March 2016)
16. Anita Dobson (28 March 2016)
17. Richard Arnold (29 March 2016)
18. Rachel Khoo (30 March 2016)
19. Kate Garraway (31 March 2016)
20. Hazel Irvine (1 April 2016)
