= Haunting (video game) =

1993 video game

Haunting Starring Polterguy
- Developer: Electronic Arts
- Publisher: Electronic Arts
- Producer: Don Traeger
- Designers: Dave Ralston; John Salwitz
- Composers: Tony Berkeley; Michael Bartlow; Don Veca
- Platforms: Genesis, PlayStation Portable
- Release: Genesis: NA: October 1993; EU: November 1993; PlayStation Portable: WW: 2006
- Genre: Action
- Mode: Single-player

Haunting Starring Polterguy is a comedy-horror video game released for the Mega Drive/Genesis by Electronic Arts in 1993. Taking control of a ghost named 'Polterguy', the player must bring various household items to life in order to frighten a family away from their home. A port for the PlayStation Portable was released in 2006 on EA Replay.

== Plot ==
The protagonist, Polterguy, is a rebellious punk teenager who was killed in an accident involving defective skateboards manufactured by business mogul Vito Sardini. As a ghost, Polterguy seeks revenge by haunting Vito's home and tormenting him and his family.

During the game, Polterguy frightens the Sardini family out of four different homes, following which the family chihuahua transforms into a grotesque blob monster known as 'Ecto Beast', which Polterguy must confront in battle.

== Gameplay ==
In the single-player game, the player controls a rebellious dead teenager, Polterguy, in a house occupied by a yuppie Italian family, the Sardinis, through an isometric, 3/4 perspective. The player's task is to scare each family member out of the house by possessing various household objects through the use of colored indicators called "Fright 'ems". These are shiny indicators on objects that allows the player to know what objects in the houses are available to haunt. To activate these, Polterguy must jump into the object that has a Fright 'em glowing on it to "load" the object for a jump scare to one of the family members. There are three different types of Fright 'ems to interact with, though they can be tied to virtually any object in the game. The Fright 'ems found in the game are as follows:

- Blue Fright 'ems

These Fright 'ems work automatically, meaning they will activate as soon as a family member gets close enough to one after Polterguy has decided to activate, or "load" it.

- Orange Fright 'ems

These are manually triggered scares. The player must keep Polterguy inside of the object until a family member is close enough to scare; it may then be triggered by a button press.

- Green Fright 'ems

These allow Polterguy to take control of certain objects. With the use of green Fright 'ems, the player can use the D-pad to float around ghostly heads, possessed toy airplanes, or severed hands, to name a few. These objects can be moved around to frighten the Sardini family, and usually, an added effect can be triggered, such as flying toy aircraft shooting projectiles for an added fear effect to the family members.

Polterguy uses these Fright 'ems to interact and possess objects in different rooms of the house until every family member's fear level reaches "Very Scared", at which point they'll possibly run out of the house if in a room that leads to an exit door. Once every family member runs out of the house, a level is completed.

During gameplay, Polterguy's "ecto" energy bar gradually depletes over time, which can be partially recovered after successfully frightening a family member out of a room, or using certain spells at Polterguy's disposal. When Polterguy's ecto tank is depleted, he is sent to the underworld stages of the game to recover the ecto he lost during the house stages.

=== Houses ===
There are four houses which Polterguy must drive the Sardini family from. Over the four houses, Polterguy will encounter approximately 400 objects which he can possess and interact with. Polterguy cannot ordinarily be harmed in these stages, but his ecto slowly decreases over time. His ecto "tank" can be further decreased by the barks of the family's dog, as well as by taking damage from the ecto beasts who may appear after a family member flees a room.

=== Underworld ===
In these stages, Polterguy must collect all ecto drops to escape. Only one ecto drop appears at a time. If the ecto or exit is off-screen, an arrow will point to it. Once the exit is found, Polterguy is returned to the house at the exact point where he left off. The dungeon is also the place where Polterguy may find special spells; these drop from the roof like ecto but disappear much faster.

There are various hazards that can harm Polterguy in the Underworld, such as bats, bouncing skulls and arms from the walls and floor. Polterguy's health is represented by a portrait in the lower left corner. The portrait will shrink when Polterguy takes damage until only the eyes remain. When all health is depleted, the game is over. Health does not replenish between Underworld stages but very rarely a star-shaped ecto drop will appear and fully heal Polterguy when picked up.

There are twelve dungeon paths; once these have all been played they repeat.

=== Two-player mode ===
In this mode (which is accessed by pressing the second player's start button at the title screen), each player takes turns at scaring the family. Player one starts by default and continues until their ecto-tank is depleted, whereupon player two takes over.

When both players' turns are finished, they play head-to-head simultaneously in the Underworld stage and try to grab as much ecto as they can before the other player. The player that hits the "finish" spot at the end gets the first turn back in the house.

If one player dies in the Underworld, the game reverts to single-player for the remaining player.

=== Hazards ===
In the Underworld levels, there are several hazards that may reduce Polterguy's life portrait: these include steam vents, disembodied hands, bats, and bouncing skulls.

The Ecto Beasts are attracted to the Ecto that appears after Polterguy chases a family member out of a room. These green, ghostly creatures will pick up the Ecto dropped from the frightened family member, stopping Polterguy from replenishing his own Ecto-Tank, after which they will attack Polterguy and reduce his Ecto meter further. At later levels in the game, these enemies appear more frequently. Polterguy is armed with two different kick attacks to defeat these enemies. One being a fast kick that does little damage, and another being a charge kick that will defeat the Ecto Beasts with one hit.

The family dog, an unnamed Chihuahua, is the only living creature in the game that can detect Polterguy in the house. When the dog barks at Polterguy, the ecto meter substantially drops, and the fear levels of any family members in the room go down, since the dog is said to "comfort" the Sardinis, effectively calming them down from the fear Polterguy induces.

Once all the members of the family have left the final house, the dog moves to a square vacant room which has no objects that Polterguy may possess. At this point, the dog transforms into a giant Ecto Beast, which Polterguy must defeat to complete the game.

== Reception ==
Haunting met with positive reception upon release. GamePro stated that it was "One of the most unique vidgames [sic] of the year!" Game Players stated "This game's so fun, it's scary!", with both quotes being printed as blurbs directly on the North American release's box art.

== See also ==
- Ghost Master, a similar game released in 2003.
- Haunt the House: Terrortown, another game with similar mechanics released in 2013.
