= The Ink Thief =

- Genre: Fantasy; Comedy; Musical; Family
- Created by: Steve Hanson
- Written by: Paul Springer
- Directed by: Tony White
- Starring: Richard O'Brien; Joyce Springer; Richard Ridings; Toyah Willcox; Gary Martin; Felicity Todd; Stefan Weclawek; Paul Springer; Allen Williams
- Theme music composer: Adrian Lee
- Composer: Adrian Lee
- No. of seasons: 1
- No. of episodes: 7

Production
- Executive producer: Ruth Beni
- Producer: Paul Springer
- Cinematography: Derek V. Browne
- Running time: 30
- Production company: Tyne Tees Television

Original release
- Network: ITV (CITV)
- Release: July 20 – August 31, 1994

The Ink Thief is a 1994 British children's television show, shown on the ITV channel during their CITV strand. It starred Richard O'Brien and Toyah Willcox. The series was produced by Animus Entertainment for Tyne Tees Television.

== Plot summary ==
The titular antagonist known only as the Ink Thief (O'Brien) steals the power of imagination by sucking the "ink" out of books and drawings. At the start of the show, brother and sister Jim and Sam stumble upon his gothic world filled with Oobs, Bumps, and other imaginary creatures. During the course of the show, the children's friendship is tested as Jim is manipulated by the Ink Thief, whereas Sam fights to stop him. Each episode is peppered with plot-specific songs, giving the show a musical feel.

== Production ==
Illustrator Steve Hanson developed the first concept art for the show. Production Designer Murti Schofield says on his website: "It should be remembered that it was Steve’s brilliant concepts that got everybody fired up in the first place." The show was written by Paul Springer, who also authored a book based on the series.

Director Tony White described it as "very much a low-budget, no-time effort but it was successful on British Television, making No. 5 in the ratings" Some of the production crew, including White and Schofield, also acted in the show in small parts. The writer Paul Springer appeared in a larger role, as the character "Toddy", the Ink Thief's bumbling cat henchman. The series' various songs were composed by Adrian Lee. The show only lasted for one season, consisting of seven half-hour-long episodes.

== Cast ==
Main cast:

- Felicity Todd as Sam - An artistic girl who stumbles into the world of Bumps and fights to win back her brother from The Ink Thief's clutches.
- Stefan Weclawek as Jim - A bright boy whose knowledge of science makes him vulnerable to being used by The Ink Thief.
- Richard O'Brien as The Ink Thief - A muse-like creature who's supposed to inspire writers and artists, but he's gone rogue and consumes imagination to boost his own power.
- Joyce Springer as Miz Tiggle - A librarian who often speaks in confounding riddles, the good-natured Miz Tiggle is sister to the Ink Thief.
- Gary Martin as Lorni Snoop - A floppy-eared bump who loves to Snoop but is frightened of his own shadow.
- Toyah Willcox as Dog - A loyal friend to Miz Tiggle who strives to protect the library.
- Richard Ridings as Aloysius - The Ink Thief's righthand man, a muscular rat.
- Paul Springer as Toddy - A dimwitted cat who works for the Ink Thief.
- Owain Thomas - Creaker
- Kristen Wilkin - Thumper
- Tamir Randall - Roll
- Mary-Louise Clark - Shake Rattle/Storm

Appearing in five episodes or less:

- Andy Andrews - Hot Air
- James Barton - Sir Bumpalot/Mr Waverley
- Tessa Crockett - Moonshooter 1/Messa Sloppit
- Trevor Michael Georges - Rock
- Catherine Jansen - Cheesey/Mrs. Waverley
- Zoe Loyell Othen - Goosebump
- Sally Owen - Loose Page/Big Balloonie
- Dave Price - Previous Ink Thief
- Talia Benni Randall - Moonshooter 2
- Julia Righton - The Bumpess
- Murti Schofield - Air Academy Bump/Shark
- Tony White - Leonardo da Vinci

== Episodes ==
No.	Title	Directed by	Written by	Original release date
1	"Hello Kiddies"	Tony White	Paul Springer	July 20, 1994
After moving to a new home, Samantha and Jim Stumble onto the lair of the Ink Thief, meet the mysterious librarian Miz Tiggle, and encounter other strange creatures who go bump in the night. Song: Sneaking - Lornie Snoop
2	"Strange Books"	Tony White	Paul Springer	July 27, 1994
When Jim falls under the charm of The Ink Thief, Sam turns to Miz Tiggle for help. Song: Your Brother's Back & He's Horrible - The Bumps
3	"Nasty and the OOB"	Tony White	Paul Springer	August 3, 1994
Sam learns how The Ink Thief became so nasty; Miz Tiggle summons a meeting of the Official Organization of Bumps; Jim discovers a way to inflate the Ink Thief's powers.
4	"Earth, Water, Cheese and Air"	Tony White	Paul Springer	August 10, 1994
Sam and Miz Tiggle set off on a quest to reunite the Four Bumps of the Apoplypse; the Ink Thief begins draining the life force from other bumps. Song: I'm Only Human - The Ink Thief
5	"Earth + Water = Muddle"	Tony White	Paul Springer	August 18, 1994
Sam, Miz Tiggle and Snoop meet up with Rock; Dog protects the library; The Ink Thief becomes drunk on power. Song: When You're a Rock, You Gotta Roll - Rock, Miz Tiggle, Snoop, Sam
6	"Cheese and Balloony"	Tony White	Paul Springer	August 24, 1994
Mizz Tiggle finds the other Bumps of the Apopylpse. Snoop stands up to The Ink Thief. Songs: Better Keep Your Fingers Off My Bumps - Miz Tiggle & The Watchdog Blues - Dog
7	"Can This Really Be the End?"	Tony White	Paul Springer	August 31, 1994
Things go south for The Ink Thief when the Four Bumps of the Apoplypse infiltrate his domain.
