= Dungeons 3 =

2017 Construction and management simulation video game

- Developer: Realmforge Studios
- Publisher: Kalypso Media
- Director: Christian Wolfertstetter
- Producer: Benjamin Rauscher
- Designer: Sebastian Nussbaumer
- Composer: Michael Rother
- Platforms: Linux; macOS; Microsoft Windows; PlayStation 4; Xbox One; Nintendo Switch
- Release: Linux, macOS, Windows, PlayStation 4, Xbox One; October 13, 2017; Nintendo Switch; September 15, 2022
- Genres: Strategy, simulation
- Modes: Single-player, multiplayer

Dungeons 3 is a video game developed by Realmforge Studios and published by Kalypso Media. It was released on October 13, 2017, for Linux, macOS, Microsoft Windows, PlayStation 4 and Xbox One, and for Nintendo Switch on September 15, 2022. It is the sequel to the 2015 video game Dungeons 2 and the third installment of the Dungeons series.

Dungeons 3 combines dungeon building with real-time strategy elements. Players are tasked with creating an underground dungeon for creatures to live in as well as defending their dungeon against invading heroes from the world above. They can also send creatures to the world above where they can take direct control of their units. The game's single-player campaign follows the story of Thalya, a dark elf sorcerer, on her quest to conquer the continent she lives on at the behest of the Dungeon Lord from the previous games. In multiplayer, players can either cooperate to play the campaign or compete against each other.

== Gameplay ==
Dungeons 3 is a dungeon building video game with real-time strategy elements. The primary task is to build a dungeon, an underground lair which serves as a home to the player's units and their base of operations. In dungeon building mode, the player controls the world with a hand, performing actions such as moving creatures around the map, casting spells, and interacting with specific items. The hand is also used to designate parts of the underground for excavation and to create rooms. Commands are carried out by little imp-like creatures called snots, which are constantly regenerated by the dungeon heart which is the center of the dungeon and represents the player's health. It is the primary target for attacking heroes and its destruction leads to a game over. Additionally, the dungeon heart room stores gold and features a trap door that can be used to get rid of unwanted units.

To build and maintain their dungeon, five different resources are available: Gold is gained by excavating gold veins in the underground and is used to pay for rooms, units and new technologies. Gobblers are little chicken-like creatures continuously created by a farm and serve as food for creatures. Toolboxes are used to make traps as well as to create certain contraptions in some rooms. Mana is generated by Demon units and is used to unleash powerful magic spells as well as revive Demon units and turn toolboxes into magic toolboxes for more powerful traps. Beer is brewed by Horde units in special rooms and serves to keep those units happy. "Evilness" is a resource generated by capturing certain places in the over-world and is needed to research stronger technologies and upgrades.

With the exception of Thalya, the player's hero unit, all other units have to be unlocked by research and hired through an in-game menu. Almost all units demand a number of comforts, including a regular wage, rooms to sleep in, food and relaxation, and will go on strike if their needs are not met. The game features both neutral units and rooms, such as a treasury and farms, as well as three factions that provide their own specific advantages and disadvantages: The Horde allows the player to hire goblins, orcs and naga and provides access to training rooms and traps; Demons consist of imps, arachnids and succubi and allows the player to research upgrades as well as generate mana for spells and advanced traps; and The Undead faction offers banshees, vampires and lich creatures and rooms like a prison to incarcerate attacking heroes. Additionally, each faction has a singular powerful titan unit that can only be hired once. Even with upgrades, players can only recruit 20 units from all three factions combined as well as up to five converted heroes; additionally, undead skeletons and zombies can be created from fallen heroes that do not count towards this limit. While each faction offers their own technology tree, many aspects can be combined for better results: For example, heroes captured in the Undead prison can be tortured in the Demon torture chamber to switch sides and fight for the player and Undead crypts can serve to resurrect dead Horde creatures. Dead Demon units will be resurrected in a lair using mana and defeated Undead units will slowly regenerate in their graveyard.

Thalya stands in front of a dungeon entrance. In the bottom left and right corners, the two mini-maps can be seen.

While in dungeon building mode, units cannot be controlled directly but picked up using the hand and dropped where they should be, for example to attack heroes that have entered the dungeon through one of the entrances. Each dungeon features one or more such entrances that also allow units to be sent to the world above by grabbing the units with the hand and placing them on the exit. Units that leave the dungeon reappear in the over-world map. Unlike in the dungeon, players can select units like in other real-time strategy games and issue commands directly as well as use their skills. Most maps require certain goals to be achieved on this map. Additionally, some missions feature no dungeon and have to be played with a fixed number of units provided. Events on both maps happen at the same time, forcing players to divide their attention.

The game features twenty single-player missions as well as a co-op mode that allows two players to complete the campaign together. Additionally, the game contains a skirmish mode which allows battles against the computer on randomly generated maps as well as a multiplayer mode where players can compete against each other but not attack each other's dungeons (unlike in Dungeons 2). The game uses an isometric perspective that can be rotated by 90° to display the environment and uses two different mini-maps for dungeon and over-world view. Cut-scenes that tell the story use comic book style drawings instead of being rendered in the game's engine.

== Synopsis ==
=== Setting and characters ===
The game's story takes place a short time after the events of Dungeons 2 on a new continent ruled by the good paladin Tanos with the help of his friends, racist dwarf king Grimli, the vain paladin Elric the Pretty, and the greedy Yaina Overproud. Tanos has also adopted a young dark elf sorcerer named Thalya in an attempt to cure her inner darkness and prevent her from doing evil. The player's goal is to conquer the empire for the Dungeon Lord using Thalya as their lieutenant.

=== Plot ===
After conquering the lands above, the Dungeon Lord becomes bored and attempts to invade a new continent which fails due to the minions' incompetence in boatbuilding. The Dungeon Lord casts a spell that allows him to control Thalya, awakening her evil side. After she slaughters the people in her home village, she decides to let her dark side take over and begins serving the Dungeon Lord as its chief lieutenant in her quest to punish Tanos for attempting to convert her.

On this quest, Thalya gradually conquers more and more parts of the continent and dispatches of Tanos' friends one by one. Facing Tanos himself, she fails to defeat him and uses a spell to temporarily transport the Dungeon Lord to the continent where he battles with Tanos who then flees and becomes more fanatic in his attempts to destroy Thalya and her forces, sacrificing his own cities and people and calling upon dead heroes from Valhalla to fight for him instead. In the end, Thalya manages to defeat Tanos and subjugate the empire under the Dungeon Lord's will.

=== Humor ===
More so than its predecessors, Dungeons 3 contains a lot of allusions to other works of science-fiction and fantasy as well as meta-humor, which includes frequently breaking the fourth wall by both the narrator and Thalya in dialogue. The narrator (Kevan Brighting) also frequently argues with Thalya during missions and alters the missions based on these dialogues, such as having Thalya be attacked by bears he conjured out of thin air because she made a snippy comment at his expense. Allusions to other games of the same genre, especially Warcraft III, as well as other games, films, such as The Lord of the Rings, and fantasy franchises are numerous.

== Development ==
Kalypso Media announced the development of Dungeons 3 on February 21, 2017, with a press release and an announcement teaser. The game was shown to reporters at Game Developers Conference 2017. According to the developer, the introduction of the over-world as an area to be captured in Dungeons 2 has proven a successful addition to the formula which is why Realmforge Studios concentrated on expanding upon this concept while keeping the changes that players liked from the last game.

Dungeons 3 was released worldwide and for all supported platforms on October 13, 2017. It is the first entry in the series that was released on multiple platforms, i.e. Microsoft Windows, macOS, Linux, PlayStation 4 and Xbox One, at the same time. A port for Nintendo Switch was released on September 15, 2022.

=== Downloadable content ===
Realmforge Studios released multiple downloadable content (DLC) to Dungeons 3 that expand upon the story:

- Once Upon a Time was released on February 2, 2018, and pits Thalya against a variety of fairy tale characters in three newly designed missions.
- Evil of the Caribbean features a spoof of franchises like Pirates of the Caribbean and adds pirate-themed monsters and locations. It was released on March 6, 2018.
- Lord of the Kings, released April 20, 2018, features a new story reminiscent of The Lord of the Rings and the Arthur Legend.
- Clash of Gods was released on September 28, 2018. Unlike the three preceding DLCs which were all limited to three new missions, this expansion offers eight new missions as well as two new antagonists. The DLC also adds new gameplay mechanisms by allowing enemies to create outposts within the player's dungeon area as well as the ability to build defenses outside the dungeon and three new traps and three new spells. Additionally, a new multiplayer mode allows two players to plunder and raze an enemy city.
- An Unexpected DLC was announced and released on February 15, 2019. It features three new campaign maps, new enemies and a new boss, the Queen of the Forest.
- On May 17, 2019, Realmforge announced and released Famous Last Words, the last planned DLC for the game. Breaking the fourth wall completely, the DLC sees Thalya battling the Narrator who acts as the final boss. It features three new campaign maps and new enemy types.
- Despite previously announcing that Famous Last Words were to be the last DLC, Realmforge released a map pack entitled A Multitude of Maps on 21 February 2020.

== Reception ==
Reception

Aggregate scores
Aggregator	Score
Metacritic	PC: 75/100; XONE: 72/100
OpenCritic	63% recommend

Review scores
Publication	Score
Eurogamer	8/10
IGN	7.5/10

The Windows version of Dungeons 3 received "generally favorable" reviews according to review aggregator website Metacritic; the Xbox One version received "mixed or average reviews". Fellow review aggregator OpenCritic assessed that the game received strong approval, being recommended by 63% of critics. Multiple reviewers opined that Dungeons 3 was the closest the developer has come to creating a successor to Bullfrog Productions' iconic Dungeon Keeper series.

Most reviewers noted the graphics and audio positively. Eurogamer.it emphasized that the game's cartoonish look and feel are consistent with the humor of the game and highlighted how the world is peaceful and idyllic when the good heroes rule it but instantly turns dark, gloomy and oppressive when the player's units capture parts of it. Other reviewers also lauded the colorful world and especially noted the level of details when units are in combat and magic effects are used. However, some critics also argued that improvements compared to Dungeons 2 were almost non-existent, making Dungeons 3 merely a polished version of its predecessor. Console versions were rated worse than the PC version, with 4Players especially criticizing the Xbox One version's graphical errors.

Reviewers also lauded the improved user interface (UI) and ease of input, which includes easy input on consoles, something seldom achieved by strategy and simulation games that tend to be tailored to PC keyboard and mouse input. The UI drew minor criticisms as well though for having menus that block the whole screen when opened, thus making it harder to use them during battle.

German magazine GameStar noted positively that the fact that different resources only exist in the over-world or in the underground forces players to care about both areas. Reviewers also positively noted the variety of missions, such as missions where enemies are far stronger during the day than they are at night or where the player has to prevent food from being delivered to starve an otherwise invincible enemy. The pacing of the campaign, giving players access to more rooms and technologies gradually, was also remarked upon positively. On the other hand, PC Games criticized the dungeon building aspect for always relying on the same pattern since there are no missions in which a scarcity of resources would force players to change their approach. That research was not saved and had to be repeated each mission was also seen as negatively forcing players into monotonous routine.

Although the game's humor was praised by some reviewers, many critics noted that not all players will enjoy the type of humor and that the game relies too much on humor to the point of becoming annoying.

PC Games lauded the new co-op mode but criticized that Dungeons 3, unlike its predecessor, no longer offered a multiplayer mode that allowed to attack another player's dungeon.
