= Richard Ridings =

English actor

- Born: Richard Ridings; Henley-on-Thames, Oxfordshire, England
- Education: Bretton Hall College; Bristol Old Vic Theatre School
- Occupation: Actor
- Years active: 1983–present
- Spouse: Catherine Jansen-Ridings (m. 1983)
- Children: Freya Ridings

Richard Ridings is an English actor. He portrayed Alan Ashburn in the ITV television drama Fat Friends, Mr Lipa in the Academy Award-nominated World War II drama The Pianist (2002), Bernard Green in the BBC One comedy-drama Common as Muck, Mr. Bumble in the BBC series Dickensian, and is the voice of Daddy Pig in Peppa Pig. He trained as an actor at Bretton Hall College, then the Bristol Old Vic Theatre School. He is the father of singer-songwriter Freya Ridings.

== Career ==
He had roles in a series of other television series and feature films, among them Clockwise, The Ink Thief, Red Dwarf, Randall and Hopkirk (Deceased), Who Framed Roger Rabbit, Fierce Creatures and as Silas in Highlander: The Series. Ridings voices Daddy Pig in the animated children's series Peppa Pig, Father Christmas and Boss Dwarf in Ben and Holly's Little Kingdom, and Grooby in Q Pootle 5. In 2005, he took the lead role in the BBC Radio 4 sitcom Clement Doesn't Live Here Anymore, playing a sexually obsessed overweight ghost alongside Steve Furst and Amanda Abbington. The second series was transmitted in May, 2007.

Ridings has also provided voiceovers in video games, including the voice of Sarge in Quake III Arena, the Mentor in Dungeon Keeper and Dungeon Keeper 2, Mendechaus in War for the Overworld, Roach in Heavenly Sword, General Pig in Puppeteer, and ex-lawman Giles the Farmer in Fable II, on the Xbox 360 video game console. In 2010 he also provided the voice of Pigsy, in the video game Enslaved: Odyssey to the West and of Cornell (the Dark Lord of the Lycanthropes) in Castlevania: Lords of Shadow. In 2011 he provided the voice of the leader of the Machina refugees, Miqol, in Xenoblade Chronicles and in 2013 he provided the voice of the Hunter in DmC: Devil May Cry, the Daemon Lord in Castlevania: Lords of Shadow - Mirror of Fate, and the Green Man in Tearaway. In 2016 he voiced Thorgrim Grudgebearer in Total War: Warhammer.

Most recently, Ridings played a courageous ape named "Buck" in the "Planet of the Apes" prequel, Rise of the Planet of the Apes, which was released in August 2011. In 2015, he played Mr Bumble in the BBC miniseries Dickensian.

== Filmography ==
=== Film ===
Year	Film	Role	Director	Notes
1984	Lassiter	German Guard #2	Roger Young	
1986	Clockwise	Policeman at Crash	Christopher Morahan	
1987	The Fourth Protocol	Skinhead	John Mackenzie	
1987	Billy the Kid and the Green Baize Vampire	Egypt	Alan Clarke	
1988	Who Framed Roger Rabbit	Angelo	Robert Zemeckis	
1989	Out of Town	Labourer	Norman Hull	Short film
1989	Erik the Viking	Thorfinn Skullsplitter	Terry Jones	
1990	King of the Wind	Jailer	Peter Duffell	
1996	Different for Girls		Richard Spence	Uncredited
1996	The Wind in the Willows	The Guard	Terry Jones	
1997	Fierce Creatures	Hugh Primates	Fred Schepisi; Robert Young	
1998	Up 'n' Under	Frank	John Godber	
1999	The Messenger: The Story of Joan of Arc	La Hire	Luc Besson	
2002	The Pianist	Mr Lipa	Roman Polanski	
2002	Puckoon	Alex Walker	Terence Ryan	
2002	The Princess and the Pea	King Windham / Button	Mark Swan	Voice
2003	Lara Croft Tomb Raider: The Cradle of Life	Mr Monza	Jan de Bont	
2005	Frozen	Lorry Driver	Juliet McKoen	
2005	The Brothers Grimm	Bunst	Terry Gilliam	
2005	Oliver Twist	Warder	Roman Polanski	
2006	Amazing Grace	Speaker of the House	Michael Apted	
2008	Faintheart	Collin	Vito Rocco	
2009	Creation	Thatcher	Jon Amiel	
2011	Rise of the Planet of the Apes	Buck	Rupert Wyatt	
2011	Isle of Spagg	Bob / Mel	The Brothers McLeod	Voice; Short film
2012	The Scapegoat	Landlord	Charles Sturridge	
2012	The Horsemen	Gary	Samuel Bailey	Short film
2013	National Theatre Live: This House	Joe Harper	Jeremy Herrin	
2013	Jack and the Cuckoo-Clock Heart	Arthur	Stéphane Berla; Mathias Malzieu	Voice (English version)
2013	The Physician	Tough Guy	Philipp Stölzl	
2015	Peppa Pig: The Golden Boots	Daddy Pig (UK)	Mark Baker; Neville Astley	Voice; Short film
2016	The Carer	Pub Landlord	János Edelényi	

=== TV series ===
Year	Title	Role	Notes
1983	Reilly, Ace of Spies	Vanderberg	1.02 "Prelude to War"
1984–1986	Fairly Secret Army	Ron Boat	10 episodes
1986	Dempsey and Makepeace	Tulley's Sidekick	3.08 "The Cortez Connection"
1987	The Ritz	Mad Mick	6 episodes
1987	Matlock	Nicky	2.01 "The Billionaire"
1987	Home to Roost	Millwall	3.05 "Crime Watch"
1987	The Continental	Mad Mick	Television film
1988	The Comic Strip Presents...	Yob 1	4.04 "The Yob"
1988	Casualty	Kevin	3.02 "Desperate Odds"
1988	Watching	Alistair	2.16 "Twitching"
1989	The Bill	Campbell	5.49 "A Quiet Life"
1989	Saracen	Bulmer	1.10 "Three Blind Mice"
1990	The Castle of Adventure	Nico	8 episodes
1991	Red Dwarf	D.N.A. Ship Computer	Voice; 4.02 "DNA"
1992	Sean's Show	Steve	1.06 "Blind Date"
1992	The Young Indiana Jones Chronicles	Andre	2.02 "Somme, Early August 1916"
1992	Liquid Television	Diner Cook #1	5 episodes
1992	Boon	Keith	7.07 "The Sharp End"
1993	Minder	Warren	9.02 "No Way to Treat a Daley"
1993	Comics	Tommy Karr	2 episodes
1993	Casualty	Jack	8.02 "Riders on the Storm"
1993	Red Dwarf	Crazed Astro	6.01 "Psirens"
1993	Screen One	Kevin	5.06 "Money for Nothing"
1994	A Pinch of Snuff	Brian Burkhill	Television film
1994	Pie in the Sky	Gary Bourne	1.09 "Who Only Stand and Wait"
1994	Wild Justice	Carl	Television film
1994	The Ink Thief	Aloysius	7 episodes
1994–1997	Common As Muck	Bernard Green	12 episodes
1994	Heartbeat	Thorpe	4.15 "A Bird in the Hand"
1995	The All New Alexei Sayle Show		2.03 "Episode #2.3"
1995	Sorry About Last Night	Greg	Television film
1995	Cruel Train	Percy Cotton	Television film
1996	On Dangerous Ground	Thomas Borga	Television film
1997	Highlander: The Series	Silas	2 episodes
1997	The History of Tom Jones, a Foundling	Reverend Thwackum	5 episodes
1998	Casualty	Ted Stokes	12.22 "Love Me Tender"
2000	This Is Personal: The Hunt for the Yorkshire Ripper	Det. Supt. Dick Holland	Television miniseries
2000	Nature Boy	Ted	Television miniseries
2000	Randall & Hopkirk (Deceased)	PC Buns	1.06 "A Man of Substance"
2000	Relic Hunter	Johnny the Jackhammer	1.21 "Nothing But the Truth"
2000–2004	Fat Friends	Alan Ashburn	14 episodes
2001	Murder in Mind	DCI Quarry	1.01 "Teacher"
2001	Where the Heart Is	Paul Foster	5.13 "Declaration"
2001	Merseybeat	Ben Ormerod	1.09 "Crying Out Loud"
2002	Born and Bred	Horace Trubshaw	1.03 "The Inspector Calls"
2002	Auf Wiedersehen, Pet	D.I. Andy Hateley	3.06 "An Inspector Calls"
2003	Margery & Gladys	Terry Mason	Television film
2004	Dalziel and Pascoe	Trevor Nesbitt	8.03 "Great Escapes"
2004–present	Peppa Pig	Daddy Pig (UK)	Voice (main character)
2004	Casualty	Robbie Beresford	18.39 "The Good Father"
2005	Timewatch	Elder Sextus	24.02 "Murder in Rome"
2005	The Shape of the Future	Narrator (voice)	Television documentary
2005	New Tricks	Robbie	2.07 "Fluke of Luck"
2005	Coronation Street	Barry	3 episodes
2005	ShakespeaRe-Told	Maurice	1.02 "Macbeth"
2005	The Worst Week of My Life	PC Tait	2 episodes
2006	Mayo	Mark Castello	1.02 "Requiem for a Dove"
2006	The Royal	Malcolm Hogg	5.11 "Keep on Running"
2007	Roman Mysteries	Venalicius	3 episodes
2008	Casualty	Vince	23.16 "This Will Be Our Year"
2009	Merlin	Halig	2.09 "The Lady of the Lake"
2011	Doctors	Jeff Hollins	13.67 "Sunday Sunday"
2012	Holby City	Roy Benson	14.21 "Fresh Blood"
2009–2012	Ben & Holly's Little Kingdom	Big Bad Barry; Dwarf Boss; Dwarf Mine Door; Father Christmas	Voice; 16 episodes
2013–2014	Q Pootle 5	Groobie / Planet Dave	Voice; 49 episodes
2013	50 Greatest Kids Shows	Himself	Television documentary
2013	Great MoVie Mistakes	Himself (voice)	Television documentary
2014	Our Zoo	Henning	1.03 "The Village Rivals"
2014	Q Pootle 5: Pootle All the Way!	Groobie / Planet Dave	Voice; Television film
2014	Borgia	Adriano Castellesi	3.09 "1503, Part One"
2015	Chuggington	Hamish	Voice; 4 episodes
2016	Jericho	Thornhill	2 episodes
2015–2016	Dickensian	Mr. Bumble	Voice; 15 episodes
2013	The TV That Made Me	Himself	2.12 "Richard Ridings"
2016	Highlander: Dark Places	Narrator	Voice; Television film
2016	Six Wives with Lucy Worsley	King Henry, VIII	1.03 "Divorced, Beheaded, Survived"
2018	Thunderbirds Are Go	Bob Gray	Voice; 3.04 "Night and Day"

=== Video games ===
Year	Title	Role	Notes
1997	Dungeon Keeper	The Mentor (voice)	
1997	Virus: The Game	Viruses (voice)	
1999	Silver	Fuge (voice)	
1999	Quake III: Arena	Sarge (voice)	
1999	Dungeon Keeper 2	The Mentor (voice)	
2000	Imperium Galactica II: Alliances	Additional Voices (voice)	English version
2005	Kameo: Elements of Power	Thorn (voice)	
2005	Shinobido	Kabuto (voice)	English version
2007	Heavenly Sword	Roach (voice)	
2008	Viking: Battle for Asgard	Additional Voices (voice)	
2008	Fable II	Farmer Giles (voice)	
2009	Killzone 2	Additional Helghast Voices (voice)	
2009	Risen	Karakos (voice); Drok (voice); Ukkos (voice)	English version
2010	Xenoblade Chronicles	Miqol (voice)	English version
2010	Enslaved: Odyssey to the West	Pigsy (voice)	
2010	Castlevania: Lords of Shadow	Cornell (voice)	English version
2010	Fable III	Additional Voices (voice)	
2011	Killzone 3	Helghast Soldiers (voice)	
2011	Warhammer 40,000: Space Marine	Space Marine (voice); Chaos Space Marine (voice)	
2011	Star Wars: The Old Republic	Duke Kendoh (voice)	
2013	DmC: Devil May Cry	Hunter (voice)	
2013	Castlevania: Lords of Shadow - Mirror of Fate	Daemon Lord (voice)	
2013	Puppeteer	General Pig (voice)	
2014	Dungeon Keeper Mobile	Horned Reaper (voice)	
2014	Lego The Hobbit: The Video Game	Additional Voices (voice)	
2014	GRID Autosport	Additional Voices (voice)	
2014	Assassin's Creed: Unity	Additional Voices (voice)	
2015	Dragon Quest Heroes: The World Tree's Woe and the Blight Below	Additional Voices (voice)	English version
2015	War for the Overworld	Mendechaus (voice)	
2015	Tearaway Unfolded	The Green Man (voice)	
2016	Total War: Warhammer	Azhag the Slaughterer (voice); Balthasar Gelt (voice); Thorgrim Grudgebearer (voice); Vlad von Carstein (voice); Wurrzag the Great Green Prophet (voice)	
2016	Dragon Quest Heroes II	King of Harba (voice)	English version
2018	Ni no Kuni II: Revenant Kingdom	King Leonhard (voice)	English version
2020	SpellForce 3: Fallen God	Chieftain Kabrax Faithful (voice)	English version
2023	Total War: Warhammer III	Thorgrim Grudgebearer (voice)	Immortal Empires Trailer and Forge of the Chaos Dwarfs DLC

=== Theatre ===
Year	Title	Role	Director	Performance history
1984	Bouncers	Lucky Eric / Judd	John Godber	West End, Tour
1984	Up 'n' Under	Frank Rowley	John Gobler	Hull Truck Theatre
1987	Putting on the Ritz	Mad Mick	John Godber	Haymarket Leicester
1988	Major Barbara	Bill Walker	Christopher Morahan	Chichester
1990	Love's Labour's Lost	Constable Dull	Terry Hands	RSC
1991	Troilus & Cressida	Ajax	Sam Mendes	RSC
1991	King Lear	Duke of Cornwall	Nicholas Hynter	RSC
2013	This House	Joe Harper	Jeremy Herrin	National Theatre
