= Dungeon Keeper 2 =

1999 video game

- Developer: Bullfrog Productions
- Publisher: Electronic Arts
- Producer: Nick Goldsworthy
- Designer: Sean Cooper
- Programmer: Alex Peters
- Artist: John Miles
- Writers: Zy Nicholson; Jon Weinbren; Gordon Davidson
- Composer: Mark Knight
- Series: Dungeon Keeper
- Platform: Microsoft Windows
- Release: UK: 25 June 1999; NA: 28 June 1999; AU: 8 July 1999
- Genres: Real-time strategy, god game, dungeon management
- Modes: Single-player, multiplayer

Dungeon Keeper 2 is a strategy game developed by Bullfrog Productions and published by Electronic Arts in 1999 for Microsoft Windows. In the sequel to Dungeon Keeper, the player takes the role of a 'dungeon keeper', building and defending an underground dungeon from the would-be heroes that would invade it, as well as from other keepers. In the campaign mode, the player is charged with recovering the portal gems from each area in order to open a portal to the surface. The player can also construct a dungeon without strict objectives, and multiplayer is supported over a network.

The game carries over many ideas from the original and adds new elements including units, rooms, and objectives. Development was carried out by a team of around fifty people, who focused on the graphics on multiplayer. A PlayStation version, and a sequel, Dungeon Keeper 3, were in development but cancelled. Dungeon Keeper 2 received positive reviews: reviewers lauded the graphics and artificial intelligence, although some reviewers criticized its similarity to the original. The game was later released on GOG.com, Origin, and Steam.

== Plot ==
The Kingdom of Harmonia, ruled by King Reginald, has been under siege from Dungeon Keepers for a while, and his wizards have devised a device known as a Portal Gem to confine evil creatures to the Underworld, while still allowing good forces access. Reginald has twenty Portal Gems, each assigned to a realm and safeguarded by its guardian, the Lord of the Land. These devices have forced even serious dungeon keepers into retreat. An evil warrior known as the Horned Reaper (or "Horny") believes he has the ability to remove Portal Gems from Harmonia, and has enlisted the player's assistance in conquering its realms so he can claim the Portal Gems.

== Gameplay ==
An example of a dungeon, this one visibly containing a dungeon heart, treasury, portal, and some Imps.

The sequel to Dungeon Keeper, Dungeon Keeper 2 carries over many gameplay aspects, and adds new ones. Like the original, Dungeon Keeper 2 places the player in the role of a malignant overlord bent on world domination. The player controls the world with a hand, performing actions such as moving creatures around the map, casting spells, and interacting with specific items. All the underground lands in the kingdom must be conquered to recover the portal gems. The kingdom itself takes the form of a large table containing a 3D map where the player selects where to attack from the highlighted regions. There are twenty main levels in the campaign. Some levels have multiple versions with differing methods of attack, allowing the player to choose the method and sub-region.

Generally, the player starts out with a Dungeon Heart and some Imps. The Dungeon Heart has the same purpose as the original game: it serves as the dungeon's life force. If destroyed, the player loses. In Dungeon Keeper 2, the heart has additional functions: regenerating mana (used to cast spells), doubling as a gold-storage area, producing Imps, and sending certain creatures to investigate threats it detects. Gold is the currency used to construct rooms, traps, and doors, and pay minions. Gold is obtained primarily by digging gold and gem seams, the latter providing an unlimited supply. This is performed by the Imps, the main workforce of the dungeon, who dig and claim tiles for the player to control. Another main task Imps perform is the fortification of walls adjacent to tiles owned by the player, although this no longer makes them impenetrable to enemies, but merely makes digging take longer.

The primary rooms include the Lair, Hatchery, Training Room, Library, and the Treasury. These have the same purpose as the first game: they function as a resting place, feeding place, training area, research area, and gold storage area respectively. The only major difference is that the Training Room can only train creatures up to experience level four. Further experience can only be gained through real combat, such as fighting in the new Combat Pit, where creatures fight against one another. The higher a creature's experience level, the stronger and more powerful they become. The highest experience level is level ten, and creatures cannot achieve levels nine or ten via the Training Room or Combat Pit.

Other rooms include the casino, where creatures gamble for either pleasure or to be exploited for gold. The Workshop, where traps and doors are produced, and the torture chamber, where creatures are tortured, can convert enemy units into friendly units. Traps include the Sentry trap, which shoots nearby enemy creatures, the Fear trap, which scares enemies away, and the Alarm trap, which alerts its owner if it detects enemy creatures nearby. Doors block enemies while still allowing its owner's creatures to have a passage. They come in various forms, such as Wooden, Braced, Secret, and Magic. Secret doors imitate walls, and Magic doors defend themselves by shooting enemy creatures. Bridges connect areas and facilitate transport over water and lava tiles. Lava harms most creatures and burns Wooden Bridges, but Stone Bridges are immune to it.

Creatures are attracted via Portals. Which creatures specifically are attracted depends on the dungeon's composition. Each creature has its own abilities (such as spells they can cast), expertise, and job preferences. Examples of creatures include Bile Demons, Warlocks, and Salamanders. Like the first game, creatures can be slapped with the hand to make them work harder, at the cost of their health. Certain creatures, such as Skeletons and Vampires, cannot be attracted via Portals; instead, they are obtained by their corpse decomposing in a Graveyard (for Vampires), or dying in a Prison (for Skeletons). Certain sacrifices in the Temple, a room where creatures pray, also yield the acquisition of certain creatures. Creatures frequently enter combat (each follow one of four combat strategies) against creatures belonging to enemy keepers, or heroic forces defending the realm. Heroes enter the level via Hero Gates. The heroic forces are composed of different units of keepers: heroes include Wizards, Giants, and Guards. Most creatures have a heroic counterpart: for example, the Wizard is the counterpart of the Warlock. Heroes and rival keepers' creatures can be converted to the player's cause in the torture chamber after being captured and imprisoned. Creatures dislike their heroic counterparts, and their company may make them angry, which can lead to rebellions. Rebelling creatures either leave the dungeon, or defect to another keeper or the heroes, and may take other creatures too. Other things that can annoy creatures and cause rebellions include lack of food, not getting paid (creatures require payment on a regular basis), and being slapped.

Spells are cast using mana, not gold as in the first game. Spells include healing creatures, creating Imps, and summoning all creatures to a particular location. There are two grades of each spell, upgraded in the Library, the higher grade version being more powerful. For example, an upgraded Create Imp spell summons a level four Imp, whereas the normal version summons a level one Imp. As with the first game, the player can possess a creature and interact with the world from its perspective of using its abilities. A special spell is the ability to summon Horny to assist the player for a short period. In the Campaign mode, it requires the assembling of the talisman, pieces of which are obtained through the discovery of bonus levels. Mana vaults may be scattered across certain levels; these may be claimed to increase mana generation. Other magical items are special items that provide a specific benefit to the player. These include healing all creatures, revealing the map, and locating a hidden level. There are five hidden levels based on mini games such as golf, bowling, and duck shooting.

In the campaign mode, the objective of each level is the acquisition of the Portal Gem, usually in the possession of the heroic guardian of the realm, although it is sometimes in the possession of a rival keeper. Whoever has the Portal Gem must be defeated, so Horny can enter and claim it. The final level involves defeating King Reginald, overlord of the entire realm of Harmonia. Some levels have more specific conditions relating to this goal: for example, there is one level in which the player races against the clock to obtain the Portal Gem in the possession of a rival keeper before the heroes invade and try to do the same. If the heroes recover the Portal Gem, the player loses. Other game modes include My Pet Dungeon and Skirmish. In My Pet Dungeon, the player constructs a dungeon without campaign-style objectives, and can control if, when, and how heroes invade. Instead, there are criteria based on the dungeon composition and related activities, and there is no requirement to proceed to the next level on completion. Skirmish involves competing against computer-controlled rival keepers, and the player can customize conditions such as which rooms and spells are available. Multiplayer is supported over IPX and TCP/IP and is otherwise similar to Skirmish. A patch added elite creatures (stronger than their normal counterparts) to the latter three modes. Elite creatures are attracted by constructing rooms with very specific tile arrangements.

== Development ==
Bullfrog Productions developed Dungeon Keeper 2 with a team of around fifty people. The team included people involved in the original Dungeon Keeper, including Richard Ridings and programmer Alex Peters. Electronic Arts wanted to capitalize on the original game's success. Producer Nick Goldsworthy believed the key to success was carrying over aspects of the original game and adding new things. A project manager from Mitsubishi assisted the team in management of attaining milestones, and according to Goldsworthy, this taught the team a lot about the practices employed by major companies regarding game development.

It was known the game needed to use 3D graphics with hardware acceleration to keep up with trends. The goal was to have a 3D renderer good enough for deathmatch. The team was also aiming to have a software renderer for lower-end computers. The team used DirectX to improve the lighting effects.

The audio was implemented by five team members. The music was composed by Mark Knight, and Nick Laviers was head of audio. The methods used was similar to those used by the BBC for their radio effects.

David Armor and Shintaro Kanaoya headed the level design, working with the flow of the tweaked user interface created to reduce ambiguity when looking after the dungeon. In fact, the interface was redesigned more than ten times due to feedback from various groups because the team wanted the public to understand it. Testers played levels without any invading forces, which led to the development of My Pet Dungeon. An important feature to improve was the multiplayer, and great deal of effort was put into it.

Dungeon Keeper 2 was released for Microsoft Windows by Electronic Arts in 1999 on 25 June in the United Kingdom, 28 June in North America, and 8 July in Australia. Goldsworthy believed Peter Molyneux, producer of the original game, would be pleased with the sequel. Indeed, Molyneux stated that he "liked what they did with it", but also said that it was not precisely what he would have done and that his focus would have been "expanding that sense of creating the greatest dungeon". A PlayStation version was in development, but cancelled. The first patch, which added levels, fixed bugs, and tweaked gameplay, was released in August.

Dungeon Keeper 2 is available on GOG.com and Origin, and Steam.

== Reception ==
Reception

Aggregate score
Aggregator	Score
GameRankings	82%

Review scores
Publication	Score
AllGame	4.5/5
CNET Gamecenter	9/10
Computer Games Strategy Plus	4.5/5
Computer Gaming World	4.5/5
Edge	8/10
Game Informer	9.5/10
GameRevolution	A−
GameSpot	7.9/10
GameZone	7.8/10
IGN	8.9/10
Next Generation	3/5
PC Accelerator	7/10
PC Gamer (US)	89%
PC Zone	94%

Dungeon Keeper 2 received favourable reviews according to the review aggregation website GameRankings. The improved graphics in particular were noted. Trent C. Ward of IGN complimented the "amazing" graphics and commented that it looks better than the first game, but criticized the lack of major changes. Greg Kasavin of GameSpot too praised the graphical improvements over the original, and also highly commended the sound, but criticized the lack of gameplay changes compared to the first game. The gameplay was praised as "outstanding" by William Harms of the American PC Gamer magazine, but he also commented that multiplayer has glitches and oversights such as not being able to get back to the main menu after a game. Jason Cross of Computer Games Strategy Plus commended the gameplay and echoed others' views on the graphical improvements, but criticized the high system requirements. A reviewer from GameRevolution liked the graphics, scenarios, and humor. Another reviewer who liked the graphics was Chad Foster of Gamezilla, who also commended the "incredible" detail, and the "realistic" sounds. Robert Coffey of Computer Gaming World praised the dark humour, but criticized the short campaign. Blake Fischer of NextGen said, "Although still fun, Dungeon Keeper 2 is nowhere near as inspired as its predecessor."

A reviewer from British magazine Edge praised the artificial intelligence, describing it as "extremely impressive". It and the graphics were again praised by PC Zone's Charlie Brooker, who was also among the reviewers to criticize the game's similarity to the original. Nevertheless, Dungeon Keeper 2 was named as a PC Zone classic. A reviewer from Computer and Video Games was also among those who eulogized the graphics, and he did likewise with the replay value, and the multiplayer, describing it as "one of the best ever on PC". Another reviewer who complimented the improved artificial intelligence was John Houlihan of GameSpot UK, who described the game as a "more than worthy sequel". Jeuxvideo.com's reviewer also lauded the graphics and gameplay, but considered the scenarios repetitive. The British PC Gamer's reviewer said the game was what Dungeon Keeper "should have been in the first place", and cited the entertainment, innovation, and addictiveness as why the game is "pure Bullfrog", but criticized the combat because he believed it was a case of putting all creatures in and hoping to win.

The game sold 70,685 copies in the U.S. by April 2000.

The staff of PC Gamer US nominated the game for their 1999 "Best Real-Time Strategy Game" award, which ultimately went to Age of Empires II: The Age of Kings. They wrote that the game "may have walked away with the crown" on a less competitive year. The game was awarded the Editor's Choice award from Computer Gaming World, and, in 2000, a Best Voice Acting award. It was also nominated for the "Strategy Game of the Year" award, which went to Homeworld.

== Cancelled sequel and spiritual successor ==
In the Extras menu, players can see a teaser trailer for Dungeon Keeper 3. Ideas such as the merging of the underworld and overworld were planned for the sequel, but Electronic Arts began focusing on other franchises such as Harry Potter. In August 2000, Bullfrog announced that the development of Dungeon Keeper 3 had been cancelled.

In 2015, a spiritual successor called War for the Overworld was released and developed by Brightrock Games.
