= Dungeon Keeper =

1997 video game

- North American box art
- Developer: Bullfrog Productions
- Publisher: Electronic Arts
- Producer: Peter Molyneux
- Designers: Peter Molyneux; Mark Healey
- Programmer: Simon Carter
- Artist: Mark Healey
- Composer: Russell Shaw
- Series: Dungeon Keeper
- Platforms: MS-DOS, Windows 95
- Release: NA: 27 June 1997; EU/AU: 3 July 1997
- Genres: Real-time strategy, god game, dungeon management game
- Modes: Single-player, multiplayer

Dungeon Keeper is a strategy video game developed by Bullfrog Productions and published by Electronic Arts. It was released on 27 June 1997 for MS-DOS and Windows 95. In Dungeon Keeper, the player builds and manages a dungeon, protecting it from invading "hero" characters intent on stealing its accumulated treasures, killing monsters and ultimately the player's demise. The ultimate goal is to conquer the world by destroying the heroic forces and rival dungeon keepers in each realm. A character known as the Avatar (resembling the Avatar from Ultima VIII: Pagan) appears as the final hero. Dungeon Keeper uses Creative Technology's SoundFont technology to enhance its atmosphere. Multiplayer with up to four players is supported using a modem, or over a local network.

Dungeon Keeper took over two years to develop, and an expansion pack, a Direct3D version, and a level editor were released. Midway through development, lead developer Peter Molyneux decided to leave Bullfrog when the game was complete, which was the motivation for its success. Versions for the Sega Saturn and Sony PlayStation were in development, but cancelled. The game received critical acclaim, with reviewers praising the uniqueness and depth. Dungeon Keeper was re-released on GOG.com in 2011, Origin in 2016, and Steam in 2024. A fan-made mod, KeeperFX, was released, which fixes bugs and adds features. Dungeon Keeper was followed by a sequel, Dungeon Keeper 2, in 1999, and influenced games such as Lego Rock Raiders and Ghost Master.

== Gameplay ==
Navigating the built-up dungeon with the Hand of Evil

The player constructs and manages a dungeon, recruiting and catering for minions to run it and defend it from enemy invaders. The primary method of control is the hand, used to pick up creatures and objects in the dungeon, carry them around, and drop them. The hand allows the player to 'slap' creatures and objects, and interact with them. Dungeon Keeper's gameplay exemplifies a dark sense of humour.

The Dungeon Heart represents the Keeper's link to the world. If it is destroyed, the player loses. Along with the heart, the player begins with a small number of imps, the generic work force for dungeon activities: they dig tunnels into the surrounding soil, capture enemy rooms and Portals, mine gold and gems, and set traps. Imps are obtained by using the Create Imp spell. Slapping creatures forces them to work faster temporarily, but removes some of their health. Gold is obtained primarily by digging Gold Seams, and Gem Seams provide an unlimited supply, though take longer to accumulate. Gold is used to build rooms, cast spells, and train creatures. To order the imps to dig a tile, the player need flag the tile. Throughout the game, a "mentor" will advise the player as to various happenings and problems within the dungeon, as a sinister voiceover.

Once the Imps are working, the player must then set up a basic infrastructure: Lairs for monsters, a Hatchery (where chickens, which serve as food, are grown), and a Treasury. After connecting the dungeon to a 'Portal', minions will arrive. Minions include dragons, warlocks, and the horned reaper, as well as undead creatures such as vampires and skeletons. As the game progresses, the player moves along a technology tree, unlocking further rooms and spells. Rooms can only be built on tiles belonging to the player. The player is red and the tiles are coloured accordingly. Other keepers have different colours, and the heroes are white. Unaligned creatures and rooms are multicoloured. The player can build traps and doors, created in the workshop. Traps include lightning and boulder traps, the latter instantly killing creatures it comes into contact with. As with rooms, they can only be built on tiles that belong to the player. Traps are not built instantly; Imps need to place them on the blueprint. The Temple is a room where creatures are made happy, and the player can sacrifice creatures to the dark gods. The gods may reward or punish the player, or be indifferent depending on the sacrifice.

The dungeon has a fleshed-out ecology: certain creatures are natural enemies. For example, Flies and Spiders are often found at odds with one another. Common behaviours when a creature is angry include vandalising the dungeon and deserting the player. The creatures are varied in their statistics; some excel at certain tasks, and others refuse to perform certain tasks. Which creatures enter the dungeon depends on which rooms the player has and how large they are; most creatures have prerequisites for entering service. Creatures require paying regularly, and when 'Payday' comes, will head for the Treasure room to collect their wages. Other ways to obtain creatures include imprisoning and torturing them, 'scavenging' (persuaded to defect to the player) from enemy keepers, and performing certain sacrifices at the Temple. Creatures entering via the Portal are at the lowest experience level, and must gain experience, usually by training in the training room. Training creatures increases their attributes (such as hit points) and abilities (such as which spells they can cast). Such spells include lightning bolts, rebounding projectiles, and increasing armour. Creatures will frequently enter combat with heroes or creatures belonging to another keeper. Each creature has a star of the colour of the keeper it belongs to above it, displaying its experience level. The star is a health meter; as a creature takes damage, the spikes turn black. The player has the ability to possess a creature, seeing the dungeon from its first-person perspective and using its attacks and abilities. This is one of the spells; others include speeding creatures up, and healing them.

A world map is available and, at the beginning, the player is allocated one of the twenty regions of a fictional, idyllic country to destroy. As the player progresses through these regions, each representing a level, the areas previously conquered will appear ransacked, twisted, and evil. The goals for each level are straightforward: they generally fall along the lines of eliminating the heroic force or destroying all other Dungeon Keepers. The first few levels are tutorials, teaching the player the basics. Special items are hidden throughout certain levels. Such items perform actions such as increasing the player's creatures' experience level, or revealing the map. They can reveal a hidden level, where the player must perform a specific task, and is rewarded upon completion.

Heroes will appear at various points and times, sometimes accompanied by a tunneller dwarf, who, like imps, are able to dig. The dungeon can be protected from being breached by having the imps fortify the walls. Heroes include giants, wizards, and samurai warriors. Most levels have a 'Lord of the Land', a heavily armoured knight, who must be defeated. In the final level, the Avatar (resembling the Avatar from Ultima VIII), the most powerful hero, appears as the Lord of the Land, and is resurrected after being defeated. He must be defeated again when he reappears with a large army.

Multiplayer with up to four players is supported via a modem or over a local area network (LAN). The game features twenty multiplayer levels, playable as single-player levels.

== Development ==
Dungeon Keeper was developed by Bullfrog Productions under Peter Molyneux, who wrote the game design, testbed, and the computer players and assistant. In an interview, Molyneux explained that he came up with the ideas for Dungeon Keeper while sitting in a traffic jam, and become so engrossed in them that when the traffic had moved, he did not notice. Bullfrog's chairman Les Edgar stated that the intention was to use the Dungeons & Dragons theme with "slightly weird Bullfrog humour". Programmers Simon and Dene Carter also said Dungeon Keeper is a parody. Dungeon Keeper is a simulation game because Molyneux viewed the villain's duty as a management exercise.

Development began in November 1994 by the lead programmer, Simon Carter, and took two and a half years to develop. The game used the engine for Magic Carpet, and the first version was merely scrolling around a map and entering third-person. The engine was built by Glenn Corpes. Molyneux then developed a 2D prototype containing features that made it into the final game. The prototype focused on constructing the dungeon, and included the Treasure room, Hatchery, Training room, and Dungeon Heart. The characters were designed by the artist, Mark Healey.

The navigation system proved difficult to develop because computers of the time lacked power. Artificial intelligence was considered crucial, as the navigation and other aspects relied on it. According to co-designer Jonty Barnes, the team wanted the creatures complex without high computational costs. Healey came up with the idea of slapping creatures to make them work faster, and Barnes considered it a "great game decision". A great deal of time was spent working on the user interface, and at one point the idea of having no interface was considered. Carter stated that the team tried to make the sounds atmospheric and industrial so players got a sense of power. Using others' 3D sound routines proved troublesome, so he and his colleague Tony Cox wrote their own. Dungeon Keeper uses lighting algorithms used in Magic Carpet, which provided effects such as fireballs lighting corridors.

According to Molyneux, in May 1995 publisher Electronic Arts told him he had to ship Dungeon Keeper in six and a half weeks. Though he satisfied their demands by producing another game, Hi-Octane, in the required time frame, his relationship with the publisher was strained.

Development on the level editor began in May 1995. The first-person view was developed in September 1995, and the creatures had shadows added, which was believed impossible at the time. Around that time, Barnes left the project to complete a degree at the University of East Anglia, and returned in July 1996. In November 1995, Barrie Parker began writing levels, and developed content for the script language. Bullfrog tried to get a version out for Christmas 1995: it was originally scheduled for release in November 1995, and Molyneux, until September, believed that it would be ready by Christmas. He explained that it was mostly complete, but wanted to make sure that it was "absolutely brilliant". It was then the development team realised the game should focus on a living world created by the player. A December 1995 PC Zone preview reported a feature that would have let the computer take control of the player's dungeon after logging out of an internet multiplayer game.

In February 1996, Molyneux decided to focus on the project full-time. According to Carter, the creatures were made from bitmaps, and there was around 90 megabytes of graphics data on screen as of April 1996. In July 1996, Alex Peters joined the project and ported the game to Windows 95. Dungeon Keeper was shown at the European Computer Trade Show in September 1996, and was scheduled for release in December. It became evident that the deadline would be missed, and the release was pushed back to March 1997. The final testing began in April 1997, and Dungeon Keeper was signed off in June. Dungeon Keeper was released by Electronic Arts for Windows 95 and MS-DOS in North America on 26 June 1997, and in Europe and Australia on 3 July. Sega Saturn and Sony PlayStation versions were in development and due for release in 1997, but cancelled. An internet version was in development, and would have supported up to 250 players.

Carter wrote and organised 800,000 lines of code. Richard Ridings provided voice-overs such as the overworld mentor. The music was composed by Russell Shaw and, according to Healey, this came late in development. The prospect of working on Dungeon Keeper motivated artist and former Bullfrog employee Gary Carr to return from The Bitmap Brothers (he had left Bullfrog because of a disagreement with Molyneux on Theme Park), but he was assigned to Theme Hospital instead. Healey produced 90 per cent of the graphics. Most of the creatures were the team members' ideas, although Molyneux was involved with the Imps. Healey designed the Horned Reaper (who is based on an ex-girlfriend of his), who ultimately become the game's mascot. According to Molyneux, each character takes 1024 bytes of memory. The game as it ended up was developed mostly in the final few months: the team started again from scratch long into the development cycle because they felt it played like Command & Conquer. Before the redesign, instead of having Imps dig the gold and minions entering through portals, the game had the player dig gold and use it and mana to create minions. The redesign included the replacement of the 3D graphics engine with a 2D one and the rewriting of the user interface.

Molyneux was impressed with the creature's navigation code: he stated that it is the largest piece of code, and that players could change the map repeatedly and creatures will still find routes to their destinations. Molyneux also liked the fact that the game adapts to the player, enabling the choice of the preferred methods and strategies, and stated that his favourite part of the game is how the player digs out rather than build up, meaning the player has heavy involvement in building the level. He stated that he was proud of Dungeon Keeper's concept, but remarked that doing original things takes time. He also liked that people were unable to describe Dungeon Keeper in any particular way. Molyneux disliked the user interface, saying the team overdid the control panel, and commented that it was a reminder that the player was playing a video game. This was a key reason the user interface of his next video game, Black & White, did not feature panels, buttons, or icons. Molyneux also disliked the lack of opponent personality, and some features being hidden too well, including (according to him) a cheat code that made the mistress creature naked. In a 2000 Game Developers Conference demonstration of Black & White, he stated that it remained undiscovered.

Dungeon Keeper was Molyneux's final project with Bullfrog before he left in July 1997 to form Lionhead Studios, and after completion, he stated that he wanted to make "the coolest game ever". Molyneux decided to leave Bullfrog in July 1996 due to frustration over corporate meetings and other management responsibilities that ensued after it was sold to Electronic Arts in 1995. He intended to leave as soon as Dungeon Keeper was complete, and his departure was one reason he wanted to make the game good. As a result of Molyneux's decision, Electronic Arts asked him to leave its offices, but Molyneux wanted to continue development, so the team moved into his house. Molyneux, Mark Webley, Tim Rance, and Steve Jackson made the decision to found Lionhead when Dungeon Keeper was nearing completion. In 2017, Molyneux expressed regret at leaving Bullfrog, and explained that he was drunk when he handed his notice in, and that it was "such a silly thing to do". A sequel, Dungeon Keeper 2 was released in 1999, and the series was rebooted by Mythic Entertainment with the release of a remake (also titled Dungeon Keeper) for iOS and Android on 30 January 2014.

=== SoundFont support ===
The game uses SoundFonts to provide additional ambient sound effects. A Sound Blaster AWE32 or AWE64 is required to use this feature. The player can load a SoundFont and use it for ambient sound effects. Customised SoundFonts can be created to personalise the dungeon. The game features three SoundFonts, one of which is loaded at game startup, and Creative offered sample Dungeon Keeper SoundFonts for download.

=== Expansions ===
An expansion pack, The Deeper Dungeons, was released on 26 November 1997. It features fifteen new levels each for single player and multiplayer, and an improved artificial intelligence for the enemies. The Avatar also reappears in the final level. A Direct3D version, which brought improved graphics and 3D acceleration support, and a level editor were released for the game.

KeeperFX, an abbreviation of "Fan eXpansion" was released in 2010, and has been regularly updated since. This mod increases compatibility with later versions of Windows, fixes bugs, and adds features such as TCP/IP multiplayer support and higher screen resolution options.

=== Re-releases ===
The game was re-released in 1998 as Dungeon Keeper Gold Edition, which included the Deeper Dungeons expansion as well as a Dungeon Keeper-based desktop theme. In Japan, a similar edition was released as Dungeon Keeper Premium, (Note: Dungeon Keeper Premium (ダンジョンキーパープレミアム)) under the EA Best Selection brand. This version included the content from the Gold release, as well as both Japanese and English text and audio options.

The Gold version was re-released into digital distribution on GOG.com in June 2011. GOG.com launched a macOS version in October 2012. The game was available there free of charge for a few days in February 2014. In October 2016, Dungeon Keeper was released free of charge on Origin, via its "On The House" programme.

== Reception ==
Reception

Aggregate score
Aggregator	Score
GameRankings	92%

Review scores
Publication	Score
Computer Games Strategy Plus	4/5
Computer Gaming World	4.5/5
Computer and Video Games	5/5
Edge	9/10
GameRevolution	A
GameSpot	9/10
Jeuxvideo.com	17/20
Next Generation	5/5
PC Gamer (UK)	95%
PC Zone	8/10
Gamezilla	93/100
Génération 4	6/6

Dungeon Keeper received critical acclaim. The gameplay and uniqueness were its most heavily complimented aspects. Chris Lombardi of Computer Gaming World praised the multiplayer mode, saying that it "promises to be extraordinarily rich and subtle". His conclusion was that Dungeon Keeper is "The most unique game in years; stylish, multifaceted, and as deep as the pits of hell". Game Revolution's reviewer agreed with Lombardi by believing that "Dungeon Keeper is a revolutionary, terrific game", and also complimented the "terrific" graphics and the "nearly as impressive" sound. Rob Smith of GamePro argued that the multiplayer gameplay wasn't really a radical departure from other real-time strategy games, but the "bad guy" role and particular sense of humour make it stand-out. He added that the game benefits from strong music, sound effects, and overall depth. Gamezilla's Chris McDonald called the game a "classic" and concluded, "Any real-time gamer with a yearning for the dungeon life and the nerve to slaughter an army of Monks, Fairies and Lords will be pleasantly surprised with Dungeon Keeper". PC Gamer UK's James Flynn praised Bullfrog's attention to detail, calling it "amazing", and reiterated others' views by describing Dungeon Keeper as "A stunning achievement".

In a 2001 review, PC Zone, like Gamezilla, called the game "classic", but also criticised its "repetitive" gameplay. Trent Ward of GameSpot remarked "It's a rich strategy game that is both intuitive and challenging, both innovative and polished", and felt the game was "among the best games released so far this year". Gamezilla and PC Zone's beliefs were echoed by a reviewer of Edge, who described the game as a "masterpiece". Another reviewer who agreed was from Computer and Video Games. He described Dungeon Keeper as "totally awesome!", and praised the flexibility and detail. A reviewer of Jeuxvideo.com commended the replayability and sound effects. Robert Mayer of Computer Games Strategy Plus complimented the humour, sound, and the 3D view, and liked the elements working together, but criticised the artificial intelligence. Next Generation's reviewer lauded the sense of humour, describing it as typical of Bullfrog, the "dark and edgy" soundtrack, further saying it mixes medieval themes with guitar sounds, and the gameplay's addictiveness. The only criticism was the "occasionally weak" artificial intelligence. Reviewers from the French magazine Génération 4 were highly complimentary: one reviewer commented that Dungeon Keeper is in-between Warcraft and Theme Park due to its creature management and real-time combat, and also believed that it is hard to leave a level after winning. Another reviewer described Dungeon Keeper as "The game of the year!". The magazine also listed Dungeon Keeper as their top PC CD game of summer 1997.

Dungeon Keeper was a finalist in the Software Publishers Association's 13th Annual Excellence in Software Awards Best of 1997 Codie awards for Best Strategy Software Game. In 1997, Dungeon Keeper appeared #4 on PC Gamer's list of top 100 games, and, in June, was named as their Game Of The Month. In June 2014, The Guardian listed Dungeon Keeper as one of Britain's 30 greatest video games.

At the Academy of Interactive Arts & Sciences' inaugural Interactive Achievement Awards (now known as the D.I.C.E. Awards), Dungeon Keeper won "PC Role-Playing Game of the Year" and was nominated for "Computer Entertainment Title of the Year" and "Outstanding Achievement in Interactive Design".

=== Sales ===
During 1997, Dungeon Keeper sold 113,407 copies in the United States alone. It received a "Gold" award from the Verband der Unterhaltungssoftware Deutschland (VUD) in August 1998, for sales of at least 100,000 units across Germany, Austria and Switzerland. The game's global sales reached 700,000 copies by 2003. Molyneux considered it a "missed opportunity" in comparison to his earlier games such as Theme Park, which sold millions of units.

=== Impact and legacy ===
Many reviews of video games that have similar elements mention Dungeon Keeper as both an influence for the designers and a standard for comparison. These include:

- 1999's Lego Rock Raiders. According to Retro Gamer, this was asserted to be "the ultimate sequel to Dungeon Keeper".
- 2001's Startopia. This game was developed by Mucky Foot Productions, which consisted of staff from Bullfrog. Retro Gamer said that "they'd taken Dungeon Keeper and set it in space".
- 2004's Evil Genius, the second game developed by Elixir Studios. Players control a James Bond-style lair and construct military and scientific installations, with the goal of expansion.
- 2003's Ghost Master, in which players play the role of the enemy.
- 2007's Holy Invasion of Privacy, Badman!, another game in which players construct a dungeon and protect it from invading heroes. It was described as "Dungeon Keeper meets Dig Dug".
- 2011's Dungeons but with focus on care of the heroes instead of the monsters.
- 2011's Dungeon Overlord, an Adobe Flash application via the social-networking website Facebook.
- 2013's Impire has been called "Dungeon Keeper with a side of Dawn of War".
- 2013's The Mighty Quest for Epic Loot has been called "A weird combination of Diablo and Dungeon Keeper".
- 2015's War for the Overworld is a project held by its creators Subterranean Games as "a true spiritual successor to Dungeon Keeper".
- 2015's Dungeons 2 has been described as a combination between "Dungeon Keeper and an RTS".

Dungeon Keeper was referenced in Theme Hospital's introduction scene twice: a doctor is briefly seen playing a console version, and the Horned Reaper makes a cameo appearance as a patient. Early concept art for Black & White used Dungeon Keeper's Horned Reaper to represent creatures. The Horned Reaper unit was so popular that the producers of Dungeon Keeper 2 made it a character with an important role in the game's story. Dungeon Keeper's engine was an inspiration for Minecraft.

== See also ==
- Dungeon Lords (board game)
