= WeGame =

Video gaming platform of Tencent

- Developer: Tencent
- Platform: Windows
- Available in: Chinese
- Type: Content delivery; Digital rights management; Social network service
- License: Proprietary software
- Website: www.wegame.com

WeGame is the primary gaming platform developed by the Chinese technology company Tencent. It serves as Tencent's flagship game portal, offering a wide range of games, digital distribution services, and community features for players.

== History ==
In April 2017, Tencent unveiled WeGame which will host games, content, and services from all over the world and will provide gaming info, purchases, downloads, live streaming and community services, creating an open ecosystem for gaming.

WeGame is an upgraded version of TGP (Tencent Games Platform) that has more than 200 million active users (compared to Steam's 125 million) and over 4.5 billion downloads, and is widely considered as a direct competitor to Steam.

The gaming platform will support both Chinese and global users through separate storefront and is due to go online on 1 September 2017. Tencent has stated that the platform will focus on PC and standalone games and will no longer host web or mobile games, and will provide support to small and indie companies.

Tencent launches Steam Link-like mobile streaming app for Android and iOS that lets users stream their desktop games from the PC storefront WeGame to a mobile device over wi-fi.

In February 2020, WeGame had an estimated 70 million monthly active users.

== WeGame X ==
In April 2019, Tencent launched the game distribution platform WeGame X for selling games internationally, without much fanfare. At the time of launch, it had only 17 games available in the store.

== Tencent Cloud Gaming Solution ==
Tencent Cloud Gaming Solution is a cloud-based game streaming service similar to Stadia or Xbox xCloud, which allows users to play games without any downloads required. Currently, the service is accessible only through the WeGame application. Tencent has restricted the launch to the Chinese market although it does have plans for international expansion. The cloud gaming service can also be accessed through the WeGame mobile app.
