= War for the Overworld =

2015 video game

- Game logo during the Kickstarter campaign
- Developer: Brightrock Games
- Engine: Unity
- Platforms: Windows, OS X, Linux
- Release: WW: 2 April 2015
- Genres: Real-time strategy, god game, dungeon management game
- Mode: Multiplayer; single-player

War for the Overworld is a 2015 real-time strategy video game developed by Brightrock Games (previously called Subterranean Games) based in Brighton, UK. The game started as a crowdfunding campaign on Kickstarter, which ran from November 29, 2012, to January 3, 2013. In the game, players build dungeons containing deadly traps to kill adventuring heroes that enter. The game is inspired by Dungeon Keeper, StarCraft, Overlord, and Evil Genius. It includes a campaign, sandbox mode, and online multiplayer.

== Plot ==
The "mad god" Mendechaus (voiced by fourth wall breaking narrator Richard Ridings) restores underlord Oberon and orders them to invade the underworld of the empire of Kairos, a realm protected by the goddess Kira. Oberon gradually pushes through Kairos' underworld, defeating both goodly heroes and traitorous underlords in an effort to retrieve the demonic Kenos artifact, which will allow for a final assault on Kairos' capital. After besieging the capital and defeating the emperor, Mendechaus betrays Oberon. Kira, who has previously played a role in the apparent betrayals of several underlords before, saves Oberon from destruction, addressing them as Overseer.

== Gameplay ==
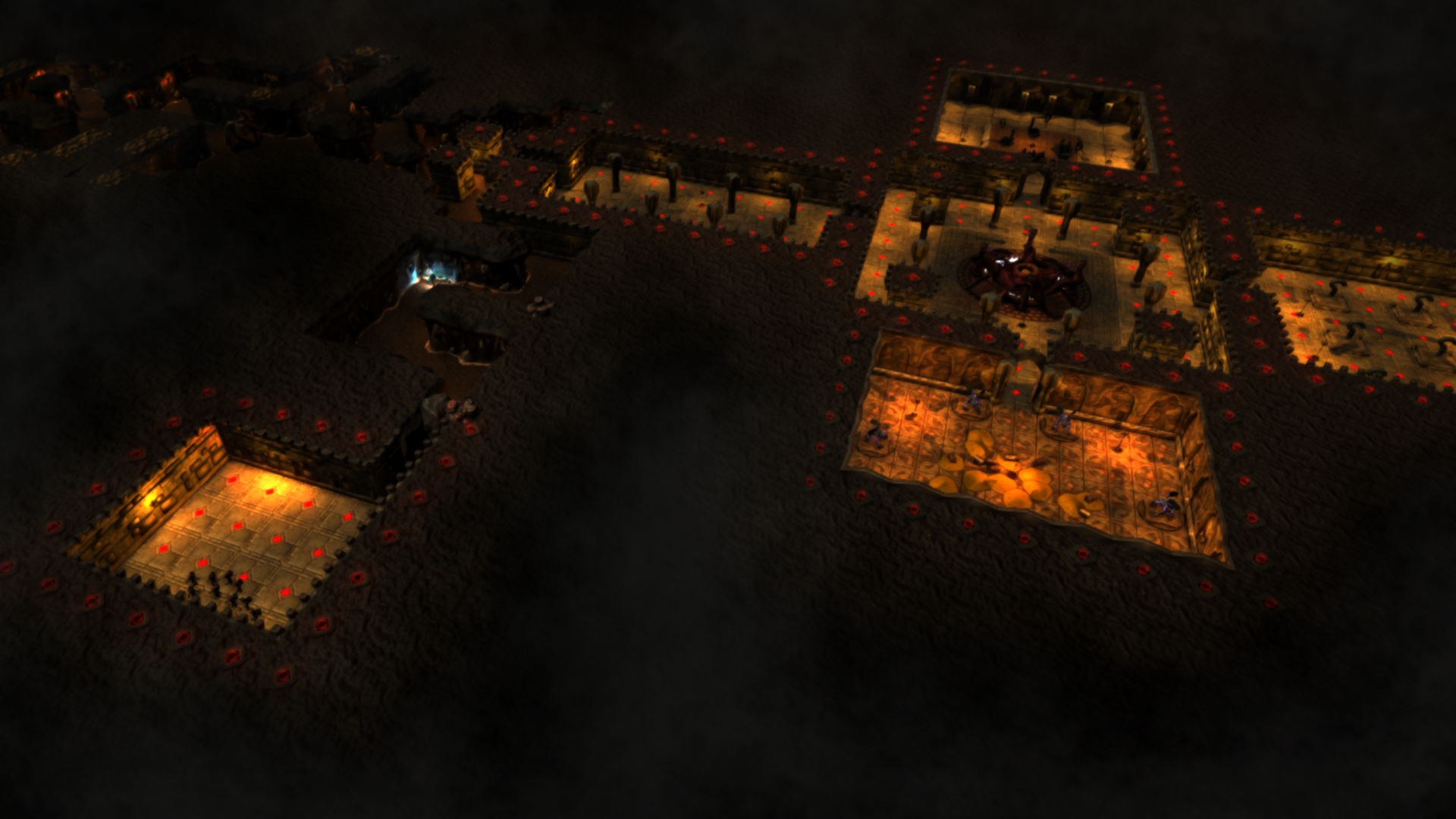
Players construct dungeons to trap would-be heroes in a very early alpha version.

In the game, players assume the role of an Underlord tasked with building dungeons that contain deadly traps and enemies to kill wandering heroes. The game starts with a blank slate and lets players choose where to "dig, fortify, and build" to create their dungeon. The game is played in real time, with the player actively making decisions while fighting occurs. Armies of minions can be trained and commanded to vanquish foes, and spells are available which can injure enemies or assist minions during battle. The game requires micromanagement to keep minions working, supplying them with food and gold.

== History ==
=== Origins ===
War for the Overworld started development in 2009 as a fan-made sequel to Dungeon Keeper and Dungeon Keeper 2. Taking its name from the subtitle of the defunct Dungeon Keeper 3, the game went through several incarnations, starting with a version based on a custom OpenGL engine, and later Unreal Development Kit, it was announced in November 2011 that a decision had been made to leave the Dungeon Keeper IP and the team finally settled on using the Unity Engine, announcing the change in June 2012.

Subterranean games went on to join with another indie developer called Rise Games who had been working on Epoch Saga: Shattered Shores, a role-playing game set in Atlantis. announcing the collaboration September 2012.

=== Funding campaign ===
On November 29, 2012, Subterranean Games launched a Kickstarter campaign for their game with a £150,000 goal set for January 3, 2013. For every £75,000 the campaign receives, the developers plan to release one of twelve flex goals determined by vote. These goals offer extra content for the game including more multiplayer and co-op content and a dungeon crawl mode which lets players be the hero in the dungeon scenario. Backers—people that pledge during the campaign—are given rewards based on the size of their pledge. Rewards include beta access, a digital copy of the game, and a copy of the game's soundtrack. If the campaign reaches its base goal, the developers plan to release the game on Microsoft Windows, OS X, and Linux on August 30, 2013, and they would additionally release a modding tool to the community. Called the Dungeoneer, it would allow users to create new maps, campaigns and game modes.

On December 22, 2012, Dungeon Keeper creator Peter Molyneux praised Subterranean Games passion and strategy in making the game and asked people to pledge to the Kickstarter campaign.

By December 29, 2012, the £150,000 target was made through Kickstarter pledges. A total of £211,371 was reached at the end of the Kickstarter campaign on January 3, 2013. Further pledges via PayPal increased the amount to over £225,000 on January 6, 2013, securing the first flex goal of Richard Ridings as narrator.

=== Development and early releases ===
An Alpha version of the game, dubbed Bedrock Beta, was released on May 15, 2013, allowing players to experience the game during development, as well as assist in development by reporting bugs and giving feedback on their experience.

On February 5, 2014, Subterranean Games sent out an update regarding the delayed delivery date, stating they "were extremely naive with our initial estimate[..] as to how long it would take to release the game", without issuing a new release date, instead turning to Steam Early Access.

=== Release ===
The game was released on April 2, 2015, in an unfinished state due to time and financial constraints. This resulted in the development team working extreme hours to release a series of patches over the following weeks and months. By September, "a lot of the loose ends" were fixed with the 1.2 patch. Subsequent patches were released over the next three years, adding features including a map editor, steam workshop support, a tower defense mode called The Crucible, and finally a scripting system for the editor in the 2.0 release.

=== Expansions ===
The game received a total of three expansions from 2016 to 2018:

Heart of Gold was released on May 27, 2016. The expansion continues the story from the base game with four additional levels, a new underlord and associated cosmetic additions.

My Pet Dungeon was released on April 3, 2017. It was inspired by the eponymous mode from Dungeon Keeper 2. The eight level campaign features levels without gateways, with units instead needing to be rescued from prisons around the map. A "God mode" is also unlocked after completion, with wave based gameplay.

The Under Games was released on April 20, 2018, containing a seven level campaign, new AI, and three new underlords. An Ultimate Edition of the game was launched alongside, which includes all three expansions.

== Reception ==
The game has a score of 65% on Metacritic based on 14 reviews.

The game holds an overall score of 85/100 on the Steam store as of December, 2022.

== See also ==
- Galacticare, the developer's next game, also inspired by a Bullfrog game
