= Dungeon Keeper (series) =

- Genres: Real-time strategy, god game, dungeon management game
- Developers: Bullfrog Productions, Mythic Entertainment
- Publisher: Electronic Arts
- Platforms: DOS, Microsoft Windows, iOS, Android
- Original release: 1997–1999, 2014
- First release: Dungeon Keeper; June 26, 1997
- Latest release: Dungeon Keeper; January 30, 2014

Dungeon Keeper is a series of strategy video games released by Electronic Arts. Two games were developed by Bullfrog Productions for the PC in the late 1990s, and a third was in development but was cancelled before release. A Chinese MMO was in development from 2008–2013 and achieved open beta release, but was cancelled before full launch. A free-to-play game for Android and iOS was developed by Mythic Entertainment and released in 2013.

== Games in the series ==
=== Dungeon Keeper (1997) ===
Dungeon Keeper was released in June 1997. It used a modified version of the Magic Carpet game engine.

=== Dungeon Keeper 2 (1999) ===
Dungeon Keeper 2 was released in June 1999. It used a new game engine that natively supported hardware acceleration. Its predecessor supported Direct3D but only with an alternative executable. The sequel also used full-3D models for the creatures and enemies, rather than sprites.

=== Dungeon Keeper (2014) ===
In August 2013, EA and Mythic Entertainment announced that they were creating a "twisted take" on Dungeon Keeper for both Android and iOS mobile devices with a release date set for winter of the same year.

On 10 October 2013, Dungeon Keeper Mobile soft-launched on Google Play and iOS App Store. The game has faced criticism due to its use of microtransactions and wait times, with Peter Molyneux, the original creator, even saying that it ruined the fun aspects of Dungeon Keeper. The game has also faced controversy due to EA's habit of censoring reviews that are lower than 5 stars.

== Cancelled games ==
=== Dungeon Keeper 3 ===
Dungeon Keeper 3 was in development in 2000, but was cancelled later that year. Some Dungeon Keeper 2 CDs contained a trailer showing some features of Dungeon Keeper 3; among them were above-land battles. One member of Bullfrog Productions stated on his personal website that Dungeon Keeper 3 was going to be named War for the Overworld. The project was discontinued because, according to developer Ernest W. Adams, Bullfrog had decided not to make any other real-time strategy games. The decision was, in effect, the end of Bullfrog as a brand; the company had already been owned by Electronic Arts for several years. EA laid off some employees and put the remainder onto other projects such as the Harry Potter line.

=== Dungeon Keeper Online ===
On 1 December 2008, NetDragonWebsoft Inc., a Chinese online game developer, announced it had partnered with Electronic Arts to develop a massively multiplayer online role-playing game based on the Dungeon Keeper license. The game was slated to appear only in China, Taiwan, Hong Kong and Macau. A closed beta for the game was launched in 2011, followed by an open beta in 2012. The game never reached full release however, and the servers were closed down on December 20, 2013.

== See also ==
- War for the Overworld
