= Construction and management simulation =

Video game subgenre

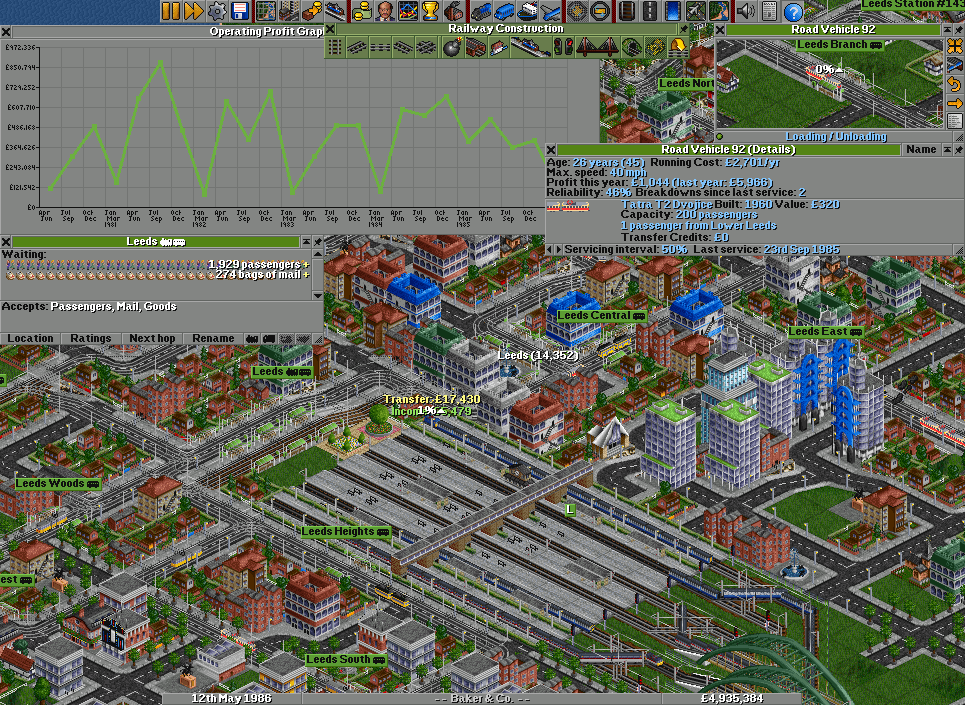
An example of a windowed interface from the game OpenTTD

Construction and management simulation (CMS), sometimes also called management sim or building sim, is a subgenre of simulation game in which players build, expand or manage fictional communities or projects with limited resources. Strategy video games sometimes incorporate CMS aspects into their game economy, as players must manage resources while expanding their project. Pure CMS games differ from strategy games, however, in that "the player's goal is not to defeat an enemy, but to build something within the context of an ongoing process." Games in this category are sometimes also called "management games".

SimCity (1989) represents an early example of success in the genre. Other games in the genre range from city-building games like Caesar (since 1992), The Settlers (since 1993), the Anno series (since 1998), mixed business/politics/building games like Tropico (since 2001), pure business simulation games like Capitalism, and niche simulations like Theme Park.

CMSs are often called "simulation games" for short. Although games can simulate many activities from vehicles to sports, players usually deduce the kind of simulation from the title of the game.

== Gameplay ==
=== Economic challenges ===
Economics play a primary role in construction and management simulations, because they allow players to build things while operating within economic constraints. Some games may challenge the player to explore or recognize patterns, but the majority of the game challenges are economic in that they focus upon growth. These games are based in a setting where an economy can be built and managed, usually some kind of community, institution, or empire. The player's role seldom corresponds to a real life activity, since the player is usually more involved in detailed decisions than a real manager or administrator. Players usually have two types of tools at their disposal: tools for building and tools for managing.

Construction mechanisms in CMSs tend to be one of two types: plan-and-build where the construction is completed gradually, or purchase and place where the construction appears immediately. Random disasters can also create new construction challenges, and some games impose constraints on how things must be constructed. But usually the act of construction is quite simple, and the main challenge of a CMS is obtaining the resources required to complete construction. Players must manage resources within a growing economy, where resources are produced, consumed, and exchanged. Resources are drawn from a source, such as money from a bank, or gold from a mine. Some CMSs allow players to convert resources from one type to another, such as fermenting sugar into rum. Common resources include money, people, and building materials. Resources are utilized in one of two ways: either construction, where players build or buy things to serve some purpose, or maintenance, where players must make ongoing payments to prevent loss or decay. Sometimes demolishing a structure will cost resources, but this is often done at no cost or with partial recovery of resources spent on its construction.

=== Goals ===
CMSs are usually single player games, as competition would force players to eschew creativity in favor of efficiency, and a race to accumulate resources. They typically have a free-form construction mode where players can build up as they see fit, which appeals to a player's sense of creativity and desire for control. As such, many CMSs have no victory condition, although players can always lose by bankrupting themselves of resources. These games emphasize growth, and the player must successfully manage their economy in order to construct larger creations and gain further creative power.

Unlike other genres, construction and management simulations seldom offer a progression in storyline, and the level design is a simple space where the player can build. Some games offer pre-built scenarios, which include victory conditions such as reaching a level of wealth, or surviving worsening conditions. But success in one scenario seldom affects another scenario, and players can usually try them in any order.

=== Interface ===
Because the player must manage a complex internal economy, construction and management simulations frequently make use of a windowed interface. In contrast to genres such as action games, CMS players are given computer-like controls such as pull-down menus and buttons. Players may also understand the game economy through graphs and other analytic tools. This often includes advisers that warn players of problems and describe current needs. As such, CMS games have some of the most complex interfaces of any game type. These games can be quite popular even without the latest graphics.

The player in a CMS is usually omnipresent, and does not have an avatar. As such, the player is usually given an isometric perspective of the world, or a free-roaming camera from an aerial viewpoint for modern 3D games. The game world often contains units and people who respond to the players' actions, but are seldom given direct orders.

== History ==
=== Early examples ===
The Sumerian Game (1964), a text-based early mainframe game designed by Mabel Addis, was an economic simulation game based on the ancient Sumerian city-state of Lagash. It was adapted into The Sumer Game, a later version of which was called Hamurabi, a relatively simple text-only game originally written for the DEC PDP-8 in which the player controlled the economy of a city-state. Other formative 1970s classroom/business sims included Lemonade Stand (1973/1979 Apple II), a simple profit-and-loss trainer, and The Oregon Trail (1971), which blended resource budgeting with stochastic events and was a popular game in schools. Utopia was released in 1982 for the Intellivision, and is credited as the game that spawned the construction and management simulation genre. Utopia put players in charge of an island, allowing them to control its entire military and economy. The population had to be kept happy, and the military had to be strong enough to thwart attacks from rebels and pirates. This game required complex thought in an era where most games were about reflexes. The game sold fairly well, and it had an influence on games of all genres.

In 1983, Koei released the historical simulation game Nobunaga's Ambition, where the player takes the role of the historical figure Oda Nobunaga and must conquer, unify and manage the nation of Japan. It combined arithmetic, Japanese history, and grand strategy simulation, included elements such as taxation and giving rice to prefectures. Nobunaga's Ambition went on to define and set the standard for most console simulation games, and has had many sequels, while Koei continued to create other simulation games since, including the Romance of the Three Kingdoms series from 1986 and Bandit Kings of Ancient China in 1989. That same year, Capcom released a simulation game of their own, Destiny of an Emperor, also based on Chinese history.

=== Beginnings of a genre (late 1980s–mid 1990s) ===
Utopia had a notable influence on SimCity in 1989, which is considered the first highly successful construction and management simulation. The game allows players to build a city from the ground up and then manage it, with challenges such as balancing a budget and maintaining popular opinion, and was considered a sophisticated simulation of city planning when it was released. It appealed to a wide audience in part because it was not a typical high-speed, violent game, and was notable for shunning a traditional win-or-lose game paradigm. SimCity has spawned numerous successful sequels and spinoffs, and is credited as inventor the city-building subgenre. SimCity also led to several other successful games in the same mold such as SimTower and SimFarm, and launched its designer Will Wright into a position as one of the most influential people in the game industry. These games influenced the eventual release of the Tycoon series of games, which are also an important part of the genre.

Transportation tycoon games involving industrial activities took shape with Sid Meier's Railroad Tycoon (1990), A-Train (1985), and Transport Tycoon (1994), each knitted construction to networks, timetables, and tariffs. "Park-management" started with Theme Park (1994), with queue design, pricing, and guest happiness into a coherent business sim; soon after, Capitalism (1995) had deep corporate simulation and found its way into university classrooms.

=== Diversification (mid-late 1990s–early 2010s) ===
The late 1990s brought a "Tycoon boom". RollerCoaster Tycoon (1999) became a phenomenon and a design touchstone for the CMS genre. It sold hundreds of thousands of copies in its first year and catalyzed a generation of park/hospital/zoo management titles.

In this period, branches flourished: Theme Hospital (1997) satirized healthcare logistics; Zoo Tycoon (2001) broadened animal-care management; Tropico (2001) fused island city-rule with politics; The Patrician and Port Royale emphasized trade empires; and sports management exploded with Championship Manager (1992) evolved into Football Manager after Sports Interactive split with Eidos, eventually became a cultural fixture used by professionals. CMS diversified across tone, scale, and platforms. Dwarf Fortress (2006) steered colony-management toward emergent stories and complex agent needs; Prison Architect (2015), a deep management sims, surpassed two million sales and later joined Paradox's portfolio.

Browser/mobile free-to-play introduced massive casual management audiences; FarmVille reached around 80 million monthly users at its 2010 peak, while CityVille quickly topped social charts, demonstrating the reach (and controversy) of timers and microtransactions in "light" CMS.

Japanese studio Kairosoft's Game Dev Story (mobile, 2010; built on a 1990s PC lineage) helped define bite-sized business-sim loops on phones, while computers and consoles saw steady genre cross-pollination with hybrids like Evil Genius (lair management) and Industry Giant/Factorio-style production chains.

=== 2015 onwards ===
The 2015 game Cities: Skylines was very successful with the audience of the city-building sub-genre. A modern renaissance elevated craft and polish; Planet Coaster (2016) revived tycoon games with powerful creation tools and strong sales (over 2 million copies sold by 2019), while Two Point Hospital (2018) and later Two Point Campus (2022) refreshed Bullfrog-style management for new players.

Colony/automation sims flourished: Factorio (1.0 in 2020), Satisfactory (EA 2019), RimWorld and Dyson Sphere Program emphasized logistics, throughput, and emergent complexity; "survival-city" and post-apocalyptic management (e.g., Frostpunk, Surviving Mars) merged harsh constraints with ethical trade-offs.

Meanwhile, "serious sim" traditions persisted; Capitalism-style business sims retained academic use cases, and Football Manager continued to expand its global footprint. Football Manager 2024 set franchise records with over 7 million players across platforms.

== Subgenres ==
Several more specific genres have developed over time.

=== City-building games ===
City-building games are a subgenre of CMS games where the player acts as a city-planner or leader. Players normally look at the city from a point of view high in the sky, to grow and manage a simulated city. Players are only allowed to control building placement and city management features such as salaries and work priorities, while actual building is done by game citizens who are non-playable characters. The SimCity series, the Caesar series, and Cities: Skylines series are examples of city-building games that have found commercial and cultural success.

=== Colony management ===
Colony management games are similar to city-building games, but based on the player starting a colony in an isolated location with limited resources, and thus are required to collect and combine resources from the local area to build out their colony, in contrast to city-building games where resources are only limited by available city finances. These games utilize construction and management extensively, with incredible detail in more aspects of the game than other simulation genres. They may also feature combat against hostile entities of the remote environment, typically not a feature of other subgenres, and often require the player to consider fortifications, so this genre may be named "base building games" The colony management genre has fewer titles compared to the other subgenres due to the niche market. Notable titles include Dwarf Fortress, Rimworld (which takes inspiration from Dwarf Fortress), Oxygen Not Included, Frostpunk, and Surviving Mars.

=== Business simulation / tycoon games ===
Business simulation games, also known as tycoon games, are a subset of CMSs that simulate a business or some other economy, with the goal for the player to help make the business financially successful.

Some business games typically involve more management than construction, allowing the player to invest in virtual stock markets or similar trade systems. Rather than invest in physical buildings, construction can be abstract, such as purchasing stocks. The closest example of a 'pure' economic simulation may be Capitalism, the goal of which is to build an industrial and financial empire.

At a smaller and more concrete scale, a business simulation may put the player in charge of a business or commercial facility, designing its layouts, hiring staff, and implementing policies to manage the flow of customers and orders as the business grows. Such business simulations include Theme Hospital, Sim Tower, and Game Dev Story. One popular area for these simulations has included theme park management, including the early titles Theme Park and RollerCoaster Tycoon, which not only give the player the ability to manage the park but plan out and test the rides. Other niche business simulations include PC Building Simulator, which lets the player manage a small business dedicated towards building custom PCs and troubleshooting computer errors.

These games also may deal at a somewhat larger scale involving managing business elements across a region or nation, which often will include managing the transport of goods between various destinations in addition to other business decisions. Examples include Transport Tycoon, Railroad Tycoon, and the A-Train series.

Business and tycoon games need not present realistic business settings, as long as the player is tasked with managing a facility with economic factors. Dungeon Keeper and Evil Genius have the player as an evil overlord managing and expanding their base of henchmen from forces of good with limited resources and economies, for example.

Active development of Internet technologies and the growth of the Internet audience in recent years gave a powerful impetus to the development of the industry of online games, and in particular, online business simulations. There are many varieties of online business simulations:browser-based and downloadable, single-player and multiplayer, real-time and turn-based. Among the most notable online business simulations are Virtonomics and IndustryPlayer.

=== Factory simulation games ===
Factory simulation games, also referred to as factory-building or automation games, are a genre of simulation video games centered on the construction, management, and optimization of industrial production systems. They typically involve converting raw resources into products through a combination of a labor workforce, machinery, and automated systems. Players commonly construct production lines and manage the movement of resources between different stages of production.

Some factory simulation games are closer to business simulations, where the player is challenged to manufacture products cost-effectively by establishing production lines and competing with other virtual companies. Examples include Big Pharma and Good Company.

Other factory simulators combine production and automation with survival and open-world mechanics. These games generally require the player to gather raw materials from the environment and use them to manufacture increasingly complex components while dealing with environmental hazards or hostile entities. Examples include Factorio, Satisfactory, and Dyson Sphere Program. Michal Kovařík, the lead designer of Factorio, cited the Minecraft mods IndustrialCraft and BuildCraft for inspiration during the game's development.

Factorio places automated production at the center of its gameplay, with players extracting resources, constructing machines, establishing transportation networks, researching technologies, and expanding increasingly complex production systems. Satisfactory uses a first-person perspective and combines exploration with large-scale factory construction, while Dyson Sphere Program expands factory automation to an interplanetary scale.

Other examples combine factory simulation with different genres. Mindustry combines factory automation with the tower defense genre, while Shapez focuses on abstract production and optimization and uses a minimalist visual style associated with .io browser games. Other games combine industrial production with city building and survival mechanics. Captain of Industry, for example, involves rebuilding industry and maintaining sufficient food and other resources for a labor force in a post-apocalyptic world.

Factory simulation games generally emphasize the optimization of production chains. As players progress, they replace manual processes with automated machinery and logistics systems, allowing them to increase production while managing constraints such as resource availability, transportation capacity, power consumption, and production bottlenecks.

=== Government simulation games ===
A government simulation or political simulation is a game that attempts to simulate the government and politics of all or part of a nation. These games may include geopolitical situations (involving the formation and execution of foreign policy), the creation of domestic political policies, or the simulation of political campaigns. Early examples from the Cold War era include Balance of Power, Crisis in the Kremlin, Conflict: Middle East Political Simulator. An early example of online play was Diplomacy, originally published as a board game in 1959, which was one of the first games to be played via e-mail.

=== Life simulation games ===
A subset of life simulation games incorporate elements of business simulation games, but which the player-character has an active role in the game's world and often tasked with activities similar to real-life functions in a business as to keep the business going. These life simulation games deemphasize the business and management elements though the player often still needs to make decisions on purchases and how they manage their time in game to be successful. Examples of such games include The Sims series, the Story of Seasons series, the Animal Crossing series, and Stardew Valley.

=== Sports management games ===
Sports management games have the player as the owner or team manager of a sports team, and guides decisions related to training, player selection, and other facets of the team as they progress through a season, ideally guiding the team towards a championship title. In some games, the management facets are layered atop the actual sports simulation, as in the case of Electronic Arts' FIFA or Madden NFL series, so that players can also play within the games as one of the athletes on the field, as well as manage the team through a season. Other sports management games, such as the Football Manager series, do not give player direct control on the actual sports matches, but may allow the player, as the team manager, to influence how they are played out, or otherwise simply simulate the games' results based on the team's composition set by the player.

=== Dungeon management games ===
Dungeon management or dungeon builder games are games that involve the player managing a dungeon crawl to challenge non-playable characters or other players. The subgenre was popularized by 1997's Dungeon Keeper, with many spiritual successors coming out in the 2010s, such as Dungeons, War for the Overworld, and Impire. The subgenre is often considered to also be a subgenre of strategy video games because players must strategically design their dungeons to counter enemies.
