= List of Bullfrog Productions games =

Bullfrog Productions was a British video game developer located in Guildford, England. It was founded in 1987 by Peter Molyneux and Les Edgar as a successor to their software company Taurus Impact Systems, with Molyneux as the studio's chief game designer. The company's first release was a 1988 Amiga port of the 1987 Commodore 64 game Druid II: Enlightenment, and its first original game Fusion was released a few months later. Bullfrog's second game, Populous (1989), garnered widespread attention and awards, and sold over four million copies, leading the company to grow to around twenty employees. It was followed by a sequel, Populous II: Trials of the Olympian Gods (1991), as well as eight other games by 1995 in several genres including the real-time tactics game Syndicate (1993) and construction and management simulation game Theme Park (1994), the first games in the Syndicate and Theme series. By this point, Bullfrog was widely considered to be one of the most innovative and imaginative video game companies in the world.

Electronic Arts, Bullfrog's primary publisher, bought the studio in 1995 and made Molyneux and Edgar vice-presidents; the company quickly grew from 60 to around 150 employees. Bullfrog released six more games over the next three years, including Dungeon Keeper (1997), the first game in the eponymous series; Molyneux, disliking his new role at Electronic Arts, decided to leave the company in 1996, changing roles to finish the development of Dungeon Keeper and leaving entirely at its conclusion in 1997 along with several other employees to found Lionhead Studios. Bullfrog released a further five games between his departure and 2001 in the Populous, Dungeon Keeper, and Theme series, as well as a port of Quake III Arena (1999), after which it was merged into EA UK and effectively closed as a development studio. During its lifetime Bullfrog Productions released twenty-two games and two ports, primarily for various personal computer systems and often with later PlayStation versions, and worked on at least nine other titles which were cancelled in various stages of development.

== Games ==
=== Developed ===
Games developed by Bullfrog Productions
| Game | Details |
|---|---|
| Fusion Original release date: October 1988 | Release years by system: 1988 – Amiga, Atari ST |
| Fusion Original release date: October 1988 | Notes: Shoot 'em up; Published by Electronic Arts |
| Populous Original release date: April 1989 | Release years by system: 1989 – Amiga, Atari ST, MS-DOS; 1990 – Sega Genesis, PC-98, X68000, Super NES; 1991 – Master System, TurboGrafx-16; 1992 – Acorn Archimedes, Game Boy; 1993 – MacOS; 2008 – Nintendo DS |
| Populous Original release date: April 1989 | Notes: Real-time strategy game, God game; Published by Electronic Arts; Part of the Populous series; Super NES and Sega Genesis ports developed by Imagineer; Two expansion packs, Populous: The Final Frontier (1989) and Populous: The Promised Lands (1990), developed by Bullfrog and published by Electronic Arts; The Final Frontier included with issue of The One magazine; Nintendo DS remake (2008) developed by EA Studios Japan and published by Xseed Games; Original game and The Promised Lands included in Populous: Platinum Edition (1990), also released under other names |
| Flood Original release date: June 1990 | Release years by system: 1990 – Amiga, Atari ST |
| Flood Original release date: June 1990 | Notes: Platform game; Published by Electronic Arts |
| Powermonger Original release date: November 1990 | Release years by system: 1990 – Amiga, Atari ST; 1991 – PC-98, X68000; 1992 – DOS, FM Towns, Sega Genesis; 1993 – Super NES; 1994 – MacOS, Sega CD |
| Powermonger Original release date: November 1990 | Notes: Real-time strategy game; Published by Electronic Arts; Uses the Populous engine; Powermonger and Populous II included in Populous II/Powermonger (1994, DOS) compilation by Electronic Arts |
| Bullfrogger Original release date: September 1991 | Release years by system: 1991 – Amiga |
| Bullfrogger Original release date: September 1991 | Notes: Puzzle game; Published by and exclusively distributed with Amiga Power magazine |
| Populous II: Trials of the Olympian Gods Original release date: November 1991 | Release years by system: 1991 – Amiga; 1992 – Atari ST, Sega Genesis, X68000; 1993 – DOS, FM Towns, TurboGrafx-16, Super NES; 1994 – MacOS |
| Populous II: Trials of the Olympian Gods Original release date: November 1991 | Notes: Real-time strategy game, God game; Published by Electronic Arts; Sequel to Populous; Part of the Populous series; One expansion pack, Populous II: The Challenge Games (1992, Amiga), developed and published by Bullfrog; Populous II and Powermonger included in Populous II/Powermonger (1994, DOS) compilation by Electronic Arts |
| Psycho Santa Original release date: December 1992 | Release years by system: 1992 – Amiga |
| Psycho Santa Original release date: December 1992 | Notes: Shoot 'em up game; Published by and exclusively distributed with The One magazine |
| Syndicate Original release date: 6 June 1993 | Release years by system: 1993 – Amiga, DOS, MacOS; 1994 – Sega Genesis, Super NES, 1995 – 3DO, Atari Jaguar; 2006 – PSP (EA Replay) |
| Syndicate Original release date: 6 June 1993 | Notes: Real-time tactics game, Shoot 'em up game; Published by Electronic Arts; Part of the Syndicate series; An expansion pack, Syndicate: American Revolt (1993), developed by Bullfrog and published by Electronic Arts; Both original game and American Revolt included in Syndicate Plus (1996); Emulated Super NES version included in EA Replay compilation (2006, PSP); A 2012 reboot developed by Starbreeze Studios and published by Electronic Arts |
| Magic Carpet Original release date: 6 May 1994 | Release years by system: 1994 – DOS; 1996 – PlayStation, Sega Saturn |
| Magic Carpet Original release date: 6 May 1994 | Notes: Action game; Published by Electronic Arts; Part of the Magic Carpet series; An expansion pack, Magic Carpet: The Hidden Worlds (1995), developed by Bullfrog and published by Electronic Arts; Original game and The Hidden Worlds included in Magic Carpet Plus (1995) compilation by Electronic Arts |
| Theme Park Original release date: June 1994 | Release years by system: 1994 – Amiga, 3DO, DOS, 1995 – Atari Jaguar, MacOS, PlayStation, Sega Genesis, Sega Saturn, Super NES; 2007 – Nintendo DS (Theme Park DS); 2011 – iOS (remake); 2012 – Android (remake) |
| Theme Park Original release date: June 1994 | Notes: Construction and management simulation game; Published by Electronic Arts; Part of the Theme series; Modified Japanese version New Theme Park (1997, PlayStation and Sega Saturn) developed by EA Japan and published by Electronic Arts; Remake for Nintendo DS Theme Park DS (2007) developed by EA Japan and published by Electronic Arts; Mobile remake Theme Park (2011) developed and published by Electronic Arts for iOS and Android |
| Tube Original release date: 1994 | Release years by system: 1994 – Amiga, DOS |
| Tube Original release date: 1994 | Notes: Racing game; Published by and exclusively distributed in several magazines |
| Hi-Octane Original release date: August 1995 | Release years by system: 1995 – DOS, PlayStation, Sega Saturn |
| Hi-Octane Original release date: August 1995 | Notes: Racing game, Vehicular combat game; Published by Electronic Arts |
| Magic Carpet 2 Original release date: 1995 | Release years by system: 1995 – DOS |
| Magic Carpet 2 Original release date: 1995 | Notes: Action game; Published by Electronic Arts; Also known as Magic Carpet 2: The Netherworlds; Sequel to Magic Carpet; Part of the Magic Carpet series |
| Genewars Original release date: 24 June 1996 | Release years by system: 1996 – DOS |
| Genewars Original release date: 24 June 1996 | Notes: Real-time strategy game; Published by Electronic Arts |
| Syndicate Wars Original release date: 31 October 1996 | Release years by system: 1996 – DOS; 1997 – PlayStation |
| Syndicate Wars Original release date: 31 October 1996 | Notes: Real-time tactics game, Shoot 'em up game; Published by Electronic Arts; Sequel to Syndicate; Part of the Syndicate series |
| Theme Hospital Original release date: 28 March 1997 | Release years by system: 1997 – DOS, Windows; 1998 – PlayStation |
| Theme Hospital Original release date: 28 March 1997 | Notes: Construction and management simulation game; Published by Electronic Arts; Part of the Theme series |
| Dungeon Keeper Original release date: 26 June 1997 | Release years by system: 1997 – DOS, Windows |
| Dungeon Keeper Original release date: 26 June 1997 | Notes: Real-time strategy game, God game; Published by Electronic Arts; Part of the Dungeon Keeper series; One expansion pack, The Deeper Dungeons Mission Disk (1997), developed by Bullfrog and published by Electronic Arts; Dungeon Keeper Gold (1998) includes original game and Deeper Dungeons; A 2014 reboot developed by Mythic Entertainment and published by Electronic Arts |
| Populous: The Beginning Original release date: 30 November 1998 | Release years by system: 1998 – Windows; 1999 – PlayStation |
| Populous: The Beginning Original release date: 30 November 1998 | Notes: Real-time strategy game, God game; Published by Electronic Arts; Part of the Populous series; One expansion pack, Undiscovered Worlds (1999), developed by Bullfrog and published by Electronic Arts |
| Theme Aquarium Original release date: 17 December 1998 | Release years by system: 1998 – PlayStation; 2000 – Windows |
| Theme Aquarium Original release date: 17 December 1998 | Notes: Construction and management simulation game; Developed by Tose and published by Electronic Arts; Bullfrog was a producer and did some testing; Part of the Theme series |
| Dungeon Keeper 2 Original release date: 7 July 1999 | Release years by system: 1999 – Windows |
| Dungeon Keeper 2 Original release date: 7 July 1999 | Notes: Real-time strategy game, God game; Published by Electronic Arts; Sequel to Dungeon Keeper; Part of the Dungeon Keeper series |
| Theme Park World Original release date: 4 November 1999 | Release years by system: 1999 – Windows; 2000 – MacOS, PlayStation, PlayStation 2 |
| Theme Park World Original release date: 4 November 1999 | Notes: Construction and management simulation game; Published by Electronic Arts; Also known as Theme Park 2, Sim Theme Park and Theme Park Roller Coaster; Part of the Theme series; Expanded version released as SimTheme Park: Gold Edition (2002) |
| Theme Park Inc. Original release date: 30 January 2001 | Release years by system: 2001 – Windows |
| Theme Park Inc. Original release date: 30 January 2001 | Notes: Construction and management simulation game; Published by Electronic Arts; Also known as SimCoaster and Theme Park Manager; Part of the Theme series |

=== Ports ===
Games ported by Bullfrog Productions
| Game | Details |
|---|---|
| Druid II: Enlightenment Original release date(s): July 1988 | Release years by system: 1988 – Amiga |
| Druid II: Enlightenment Original release date(s): July 1988 | Notes: Original game developed by Electralyte Software and published by Firebird Software in 1987 for the Commodore 64 |
| Quake III Revolution Original release date(s): 28 March 2001 | Release years by system: 2001 – PlayStation 2 |
| Quake III Revolution Original release date(s): 28 March 2001 | Notes: Original game developed by id Software and published by Activision in 1999 as Quake III Arena for Windows computers |

=== Cancelled ===
Cancelled games developed by Bullfrog Productions
| Game | Details |
|---|---|
| Ember Cancellation date: By 1989 | Proposed system release: N/A |
| Ember Cancellation date: By 1989 | Notes: Puzzle game |
| Colony Cancellation date: By 1989 | Proposed system release: N/A |
| Colony Cancellation date: By 1989 | Notes: Adventure game |
| Hell Cancellation date: By 1989 | Proposed system release: N/A |
| Hell Cancellation date: By 1989 | Notes: Shoot 'em up game |
| Creation Cancellation date: 1997 | Proposed system release: Windows |
| Creation Cancellation date: 1997 | Notes: Real time strategy game; Project begun in 1991 as a puzzle game |
| Void Star Cancellation date: 1998 | Proposed system release: Windows |
| Void Star Cancellation date: 1998 | Notes: Real time strategy game |
| The Indestructibles Cancellation date: 1998 | Proposed system release: Windows |
| The Indestructibles Cancellation date: 1998 | Notes: Action game |
| Genesis: The Hand of God Cancellation date: 1999 | Proposed system release: Windows |
| Genesis: The Hand of God Cancellation date: 1999 | Notes: God game; Cancelled early in development |
| Theme Movie Studio Cancellation date: 2000 | Proposed system release: N/A |
| Theme Movie Studio Cancellation date: 2000 | Notes: Construction and management simulation game; Game cancelled while in concept stage |
| Dungeon Keeper 3 Cancellation date: March 2000 | Proposed system release: Windows |
| Dungeon Keeper 3 Cancellation date: March 2000 | Notes: Real-time strategy game, God game; Sequel to Dungeon Keeper 2; Part of the Dungeon Keeper series |
