= Creation (video game) =

- Logo from a 1995 trailer
- Developer(s): Bullfrog Productions
- Designer(s): Alex Callum
- Artist(s): Paul McLaughlin
- Series: Syndicate
- Engine: Magic Carpet 2
- Platform(s): MS-DOS, Amiga CD32, Sony PlayStation, Sega Saturn
- Release: Cancelled (due for 1997)
- Genre(s): Real-time strategy
- Mode(s): Single-player, multiplayer

Creation was a cancelled real-time strategy video game developed by Bullfrog Productions as a spin-off of their Syndicate series of real-time tactics games. Set on an alien water world, a player-controlled submarine is tasked with looking after marine life and defending it from the Syndicate, who run planet Earth.

Creation was the working title of multiple Bullfrog games, including Magic Carpet, Power Monger, and Populous. An aquatic-based incarnation of Creation became Magic Carpet, and the final incarnation was led by Guy Simmons. The game was in development for MS-DOS, Sony PlayStation, Sega Saturn, and Amiga CD32. Due for release in 1997, Creation was cancelled due to fears that it would be unsuccessful.

== Plot ==
Creation takes place in the Syndicate Wars' timeframe. Earth's oceans have been destroyed by centuries of war, fishing, and pollution. The remaining marine life has been transported to planet Creation, terraformed by Earth probes. It turns out that the planet is not lifeless; there are fungi that are deadly to the marine life transported from Earth. Fungi samples are returned to Earth to be analyzed, but the Syndicate realizes that it can use the fungi as a weapon, and send ships to exploit them. The Syndicate purchases the planet, and decides to destroy the player. In an attempt to stop their drug-harvesting programme, an appeal for help is sent, but this attracts mercenaries and pirates who were previously unaware of the planet. Ships are sent to Creation to collect the fungus drug and resell it on Earth.

== Gameplay ==
A typical game in progress

Players control a submarine in first-person perspective. Gameplay involves exploring the ocean, where players encounter marine life such as dolphins and whales. Players also encounter Syndicate installations such as genetic laboratories and research bases, as well as their cybernetically-enhanced creatures called G-Sharks. The world's fungi causes Earth's marine life to enter a psychotic frenzy, as well as attracting Cetacea to consume their tendrils. The submarine is equipped with lasers and explosives, and players can be aided by dolphins, who have the ability to control unmanned machinery telepathically. In early versions, fish can be taken back to base, bred, and a device can be attached to them, enabling the player to control them. Dolphins can be deployed via an overview screen. Multiplayer support with up to eight players competing against each other was planned.

== Development ==
Creation had been the title of previous Bullfrog titles Populous, Power Monger, and Magic Carpet. Bullfrog co-founder and managing director Peter Molyneux explained that there was a tradition to name each special game Creation. The one that became Magic Carpet came to be because Bullfrog designer Glenn Corpes had an engine which resembled Magic Carpet, but it was slow. Molyneux suggested that he set the game underwater so that the speed did not matter, and also came up with the idea of having cities and intelligent fungi competing for the world's resources. Development was progressing slowly, and speed became a non-issue, so the project became Magic Carpet.

Development of the second underwater game named Creation began in late 1993, and the development team was led by Phil Jones. It was set for a summer 1994 release. Development was aided by a group of researchers from the University of Surrey, who studied animal life's reactions in relation to the environments they evolved in. Molyneux believed that the game would be "more exciting" than Magic Carpet and Theme Park, which were in development at the time. To get the underwater scenery correct, Jones worked form library pictures. By January 1994, Creation was a base defence game, in which the goal was to defend against other bases, and there were around ten species of fish which took around 80 to 120 kilobytes of memory. The game used the same graphics system as Magic Carpet, and as Magic Carpet evolved, Creation's graphics were backwards-engineered. An idea being explored was the possibility of linking Creation and Magic Carpet together: Magic Carpet would have had the player be able to jump into the water, and it would detect whether Creation was installed and load it if so, with the world being based on the Magic Carpet one the player had just left. Coming out of the water would send the player back.

By 1995, the project was led by Guy Simmons. In July, Bullfrog had claimed to have developed a "fast perspective scaling interpolation" to overcome zooming bitmaps' effects. In November, Alex Cullum had joined as the level designer, and the game was using a modified Magic Carpet 2 engine. He stated that the limited draw distance of the engine worked well for an underwater game. At some point after Simmons took over, he, Corpes, and Bullfrog co-founder Les Edgar travelled to Loch Ness to go into a submarine for research. They returned with ideas including a growth algorithm to simulate fungi development, and a simulator to reproduce fish movements. By June 1996, the game was anticipated by Génération 4 for an autumn (fall) release, but according to Joystick, the game was set for a January 1997 release.

By late 1996, Creation was near completion. Bullfrog believed the game was "shaping up to be an epic". According to Bullfrog, those who had seen the engines of Magic Carpet and Magic Carpet 2 noticed their resemblance to film taken underwater, and as the idea of a game with existence's eco-systems had already been discussed, it was "fate" that the elements be merged. The introduction animations were created by Paul McLaughlin. The amphibious vehicles were designed using 3Ds Max. The game was also going to feature a map editor.

=== Cancellation ===
In 1997, it was decided that "Sub games don't sell," and Creation was cancelled. Molyneux commented: "I think it's a real shame that it was killed, because it could have been something very impressive." He also stated that he believed the cancellation was because many people thought that Bullfrog should focus on games that they knew would be successful, and wanted them to concentrate on Populous 3 instead of "the unknown quantity of Creation." Creation had been in development for MS-DOS, the Amiga CD32, the Sony PlayStation, and the Sega Saturn. According to Corpes, the project had been in jeopardy because nobody was able to explain what the game was about, and there was little to distinguish Creation from other submarine games. The project leader left, and the team did not insist the project continued. Electronic Arts at some point suggested making the game into a screen saver. Corpes stated that the code is "very specific", but that the experience of special effects and 3D modelling was "invaluable". Creation's level scripting language was developed and used in The Indestructibles.

This was not the last time a game called Creation was attempted: a project by Lionhead Studios (a successor to Bullfrog and co-founded by Molyneux) as of June 2002 was codenamed Creation.

== In other media ==
In an episode of GamesMaster, Dave Perry claimed that there was a version of Magic Carpet that becomes Creation when the player goes underwater. In an interview, Glenn Corpes denied this assertion, although there was a video seemingly demonstrating it. He speculated that it was "part of selling Bullfrog to EA".
