= The Indestructibles (video game) =

Unreleased arcade game

- Developer(s): Bullfrog Productions
- Producer(s): Sean Cooper
- Programmer(s): Sean Cooper; Andy Cakebread; Ken Chan
- Artist(s): Fin McGhie; Eoin Rogan
- Platform(s): Sony PlayStation, Sega Saturn
- Genre(s): Strategy

The Indestructibles is an unreleased arcade strategy video game developed by Bullfrog Productions. The game would have had players control a superhero or a team of superheroes to do battle with super villains.

The game was originally titled MIST - My Incredible Superhero Team, and was cancelled because Bullfrog were unable to obtain a Marvel licence.

== Gameplay ==
The Indestructibles takes place in the early 20th century, and puts the player in control of a superhero or a team of superheroes to compete against super-villains in a 3D city. The player could have designed a character and its abilities, and had the option of being good or evil. Funding is granted by organisations depending on which side the player chooses: for example, the government if good and from whoever is willing to pay the most if evil. Money is used to research faster and more powerful superheroes and weapons.

According to Computer Gaming World, the action would have been based on physics rather than rules, and players would have been able to play as super-villains.

== Development ==
MIST - My Incredible Superhero Team, was in development by July 1995 and set for release in November. It used Bullfrog's Skeletal Mapping (a technique with which a skeleton's actions are calculated by a computer, rather than the artist drawing every possible animation a character could perform) to make it possible for players to create superheroes, according to Peter Molyneux. Edge stated that the game featured a "fully modelled" city, textured polygon characters, and a Pentium mode that runs at 30 frames per second. The development of the original demo was headed by Glenn Corpes, with Fin McGechie in charge of graphics. This was completed in around three days, with McGechie taking a prototype Dungeon Keeper engine and constructing a city in Hi-Octane' editor. The collision detection and multiplayer were taken from Magic Carpet.

The game had been renamed to The Indestructibles by February 1996, and was produced by Sean Cooper. At this time, PC Zone said the game looked "so damn impressive", and because of this, Cooper would give the magazine monthly reports on its development. He stated that he had "very strong views" on how he would have liked it to look, and that he wanted it done his own way and "nothing like it has ever been done before". The game was originally had a futuristic setting, but Cooper decided that he wanted a brighter and more colourful environment for daytime settings and a "dull monochrome" appearance for night-time. He said the latter was important because it creates atmosphere and that he did not want it to look like anything else. The game was of Molyneux's design. In his second report, Cooper said they had done "a helluva lot"on the game. This included "sorting out" the character movement, module linking, and ensuring the graphics and sound worked. Cooper stated that he was "supremely confident" the game would be great, and that they were seeking an animation house to do cartoon animation, which he wanted to be very colourful. By this time, Andy Nuttall had been hired as the game's Assistant Producer. In his third report, he stated that he was taking a year off, and the game was expected to be released in autumn (fall) 1997. He said that all of Bullfrog's other lead programmers were doing other projects, and therefore the continuation of programming would be delayed until one had been completed.

Of the characters, Cooper said that the cars and the player's team members were to be created using vector graphics, and the civilians using "a mixture of sprites". He said that vectors were useful because they enable the characters to be more flexible and they use less memory, which he said was useful because the game was being developed for the Sony PlayStation and Sega Saturn. By late 1995, the Saturn version's expected release date was mid 1996.

Cooper also stated that he was "working hard" to make The Indestructibles an impressive multiplayer game, and that he wanted to the BT Wireplay network. According to Génération 4, The Indestructibles's artificial intelligence featured "very powerful" algorithms that analysed the player's combat techniques and countered them.

By August 1998, the game's engine had been completely revamped, and the setting was no longer the 1920s. The game was focused at 3D hardware, and had an engine capable of "displaying enormous levels". The level scripting language was descended from Creation's.

Artist Fin McGhie said that development was not smooth and that it eventually become apparent that it would be unlikely to be completed. He left to form Mucky Foot Productions and The Indestructibles was rebooted, but that also "didn't work out". According to Corpes, The Indestructibles was cancelled because Marvel Comics threatened to intervene if any of the game's superheroes resembled any of theirs. According to Bullfrog designer Alex Trowers, the game was cancelled due to the lack interest in designing superheroes and an inability to obtain a Marvel licence. Corpes said the game "would have been cool", and Molyneux said it "was a really nice game idea".
