= Genewars =

1996 video game

- European cover art
- Developer: Bullfrog Productions
- Publisher: Electronic Arts
- Director: Richard Reed
- Producer: Andrew Nuttall
- Artist: Jonathan Farmer
- Composer: Russell Shaw
- Engine: Magic Carpet engine
- Platform: MS-DOS
- Release: EU: September 2, 1996; NA: October 12, 1996
- Genre: Real-time strategy
- Modes: Single-player, multiplayer

Genewars is a 1996 real-time strategy video game for MS-DOS. The game includes terrain editing and cross-species breeding.

== Gameplay ==
Players move through a series of worlds using a small number of sentient humanoids to build small bases and to stun, kill, research, and ultimately breed a variety of animals. Plants are also important, as different plants can be grown and harvested for different purposes. Players must use the various plant and animal species available to them (as well as hybrid animals) to deal with different environments, enemies, and tasks. For instance, a crab is a good armored defender, while a mule is a perfect detritus transporter. The two can be bred to form a creature that is well armored, but also suited to mule work. The more a particular species has been studied and created, the more effective future individuals will be.

The primary resource of the game is goop, which is derived from all kinds of biomass.

== Development ==
Genewars was developed by Bullfrog Productions. Its working title was "Biosphere".

Sean Cooper was brought in to help with the game's development, causing tension between him and Peter Molyneux.

== Reception ==
Reception

Review scores
Publication	Score
Computer Gaming World	3/5
GameSpot	5.8/10
PC Zone	9.1/10
Computer Games Magazine	2.5/5

Genewars received average reviews from video game critics upon release.

It was given the dubious honor of "Most Disappointing Game" of 1996 by GameSpot.

Simon Parkin, writing for IGN, considered the game to be Molyneux's least known creation, noting the game bearing "unmistakable signs of his design influence."
