= Blade II (video game) =

2002 video game

- North American PS2 cover art
- Developer: Mucky Foot Productions
- Publisher: Activision
- Director: Mike Diskett
- Producer: Marcus Iremonger
- Designer: Simon Keating
- Artist: Fin McGechie
- Writers: Simon Keating; James Leach
- Composer: Martin Oliver
- Platforms: PlayStation 2, Xbox
- Release: NA: September 3, 2002; PAL: September 27, 2002
- Genres: Action, beat 'em up
- Mode: Single-player

Blade II is a 2002 beat 'em up video game developed by Mucky Foot Productions and published by Activision for the PlayStation 2 and Xbox. Originally scheduled for release on the same day as the 2002 film of the same name (March 22), it was released on September 3, the same day the film was released on DVD.

The game is a sequel to the film rather than a direct adaptation, taking place between the events of Blade II and Blade: Trinity. Set six months after the film's events, it follows Blade and Whistler as they attempt to prevent the vampires from creating a race of super-vampires even more powerful than the Reapers.

The developers championed the game as introducing a new type of never-before-seen melee combat into video gaming. However, most reviewers disliked the system, and the game as a whole was met with largely negative reviews. The game was also a commercial failure, selling less than half a million units.

== Gameplay ==
Blade fighting in 360° combat. The green meter on the bottom left is his health, the blue meter is his Serum level, and the red meter is his Rage. The glyphs on the bottom left represent the three stages of his Rage meter.

Blade II is an action/beat 'em up game played from a third-person perspective, with the player controlling Blade's movement via the left analog stick. The game primarily focuses on melee combat, although it does allow the use of firearms.

Combat is controlled via the right analog stick, allowing for what the developers call a "360° combat system" – the player moves the stick in the direction in which they want to attack and Blade punches or kicks in that direction. The player has no control over what kind of attack Blade executes, only the direction in which he attacks. Blade can also block, chain attacks together into combos and perform "finishing moves", such as grabbing an enemy in a headlock and driving a stake into their head.

A major feature of the game is Rage mode. Fighting slowly and methodically charges up Blade's Rage meter through three levels: "Sword", "Shield" and "Strength". If the player activates Rage mode on the first level, Blade will take out his sword and use it for a limited amount of time. If activated on the second level, Blade uses his sword and becomes invincible. If activated on the third level, Blade uses his sword, becomes invincible and increases in strength.

At the start of the game Blade is equipped with only a "mach pistol", but as the player advances they can unlock other weapons and accessories; a shotgun, a glaive, stronger body armor, silver knuckles, UV grenades, and serum to increase Blade's health regeneration.

== Plot ==
Blade II takes place six months after the events of the film, with Blade having vanquished Nomak and the Reapers.

The game opens with Blade (voiced by Tom Clark) and Abraham Whistler (Don Delciappo) receiving information that a blood exchange is taking place between a mafia outfit and a vampire clan in the parking lot of Karkov Towers, a multi-company tower block and possible vampire safe house. Blade arrives just in time to see the exchange, with a suited vampire disappearing into the tower carrying a briefcase. According to Whistler, the briefcase contains a vial of DNA and must be recovered. Blade fights his way into the tower through the underground car park, and then passes through the "Exploitika" nightclub before destroying the computer mainframe of a vampire-run company called Nth Phase. Eventually, he finds the vampire with the briefcase, who reveals that the DNA is actually that of Damaskinos, former overlord of the Vampire Nation, and a DNA sequencer is currently unraveling the DNA. Blade is able to destroy the machine and then meets Whistler on the roof. Whistler gives him a canister of poison, which Blade puts into the ventilation system, killing every vampire in the building.

Upon returning to their base, however, Blade and Whistler discover that their ally, Dr. Grant (Kate Magowan) has been kidnapped by the Byron vampire clan. Following her GPS signal leads to a subway station where Blade fights his way through the vampires into the sewers, where he is joined by Whistler, who plants a series of bombs. Blade detonates the explosives, and follows the sewers to Gaunt Moor Asylum, where the Byrons have taken Grant. Blade rescues her and she explains the vampires are torturing humans so as to capture "dark energy", an experiment they have called "Project: Vorpal". Blade escorts her out of the building and returns to investigate Vorpal. He discovers the vampires are using the dark energy to attempt to create a super vampire warrior much stronger than even a reaper. However, Blade is able to destroy the incubation chamber and Grant then reveals the Arcan clan is really behind the project, not the Byrons.

Blade heads to the Arcan's mountain base. He infiltrates the facility and destroys the dark energy storage chambers. He then meets up with Grant, who he escorts to the dark energy receiver. Before she is able to take it offline she is caught in an explosion. As she dies, she tells Blade he must destroy the core. He heads there, meeting Whistler, who plants a series of bombs. The duo flee the base and set off the explosions, destroying the core and putting an end to Project: Vorpal.

== Development ==
Blade II was announced on January 22, 2001 when Activision revealed they had partnered with UK-based developer Mucky Foot Productions to produce the game for several as-yet unnamed next generation consoles. On February 2, in an interview with IGN, the game's director, Mike Diskett, revealed the gameplay would be melee-based, but players would also have access to Blade's sword and firearms. Diskett explained that Mucky Foot had pitched a game to Activision called Sky Ships. Activision passed on publishing the game but were impressed with Mucky Foot's work and offered them the Blade franchise. Diskett also explained the combat system in Blade II had originally been created for Sky Ships, and revealed the game would be released for PlayStation 2 and Xbox.

"Having seen the movie we had the idea that Blade was, in a way, a better game than it is a movie. It's very action based and there isn't much of a story line. It's almost like a mock up of a computer game. Even down to the fact that when the bad guys get killed they actually disintegrate. You don't have corpses lying around. There are so many aspects of it that fit perfectly as a computer game".

— Mike Diskett; director

The game was unveiled on November 20, when Activision announced it was not going to be a direct adaptation of the film, but a stand-alone story which takes place after the events of the film. The 360° combat system was also demonstrated for the first time. The game was next shown at E3 in May 2002, where the Rage system was revealed. On May 23, IGN published a full preview. Writer Jeremy Dunham liked the idea of the 360° combat system but found it difficult to get used to, and especially difficult to switch from one target to another. He also found the camera system to have faults, often getting caught behind walls and doors. However, he praised the game for capturing the spirit of the film well (something which he felt the first game had failed to do) and admitted he was looking forward to the final build.

"Taking our cue from both of the films, we have successfully recreated all of the elements that people will associate with the films. We've managed to incorporate the unique styling and the films' fast-paced action while still maintaining solid playability".

— Fin McGechie; lead artist

On June 20, IGN published an interview with lead artist Fin McGechie. He went into detail about the origins of the 360° combat system, which was born from the developers' frustrations with games that allow players to lock onto only one target at a time and force them to manually switch when they want to attack something else.

IGN published another preview on July 26. By this stage, the combat system had been finalized, but writer Hilary Goldstein was unconvinced by it. He criticized the fact that the player could not control what type of attack Blade did at any given time (punch, kick, elbow etc.). Instead all that the player could do was control the direction in which he attacked. He also criticized the lack of a lock-on during melee combat, and felt the system in general seemed unfinished: "It sounds simple, but somehow it doesn't translate properly to gameplay as most combat looks more chaotic than it needs to be. With no way to lock onto specific targets in hand-to-hand combat, it can get confusing whom you're attacking. The combat-style, while different, is counter-intuitive to the way gamers are used to enjoying action games. That could mean a whole new style of gameplay for one person, but may be incredibly frustrating for a stubborn old-school gamer like myself".

The game was released in North America on September 3, the same day the film was released on DVD.

== Reception ==
Reception

Aggregate score
Aggregator	Score	
Aggregator	PS2	Xbox
Metacritic	49/100	53/100

Review scores
Publication	Score	
Publication	PS2	Xbox
EP Daily	6/10	N/A
Eurogamer	4/10	N/A
Game Informer	6/10	6/10
GameSpot	4.8/10	4.8/10
GameSpy	2/5	2.5/5
GameZone	4.8/10	5/10
IGN	4.9/10	5.2/10
Official U.S. PlayStation Magazine	2/5	N/A
Official Xbox Magazine (US)	N/A	6/10
X-Play	2/5	N/A
Entertainment Weekly	C−	C−
Maxim	2/5	N/A

The Xbox version of Blade II received "mixed" reviews, while the PlayStation 2 version received "generally unfavorable reviews", according to the review aggregation website Metacritic.

Eurogamer's Martin Taylor was critical of the combat system, arguing that to achieve combos, the player had to play too slowly: "The way the system is implemented has turned Blade's martial arts abilities from a brutal dance of death to more of an awkward waltz of confusion". He was also highly critical of the fact that the sword is only accessible in Rage mode, he found the graphics average and the voice acting "worryingly bad". He concluded: "Blade II is a missed opportunity. What should have been a good chance for some Devil May Cry-style combat with fantastic characters and recognizable environments has instead turned out to be an extremely dull and awkward jaunt through some dull levels".

GameSpy's Kevin Murphy, too, criticized the PS2 version's limited use of the sword: "This ultimately hurts the game, as it's really fun hacking with the sword". He also disliked the combat system: "Players are just pushing the right analog stick around and don't have any control over the actual moves Blade uses, just the direction of his attack. While this is a wonderful control scheme when enemies surround you, it's just not as good as letting the player decide to punch, kick, or throw". He concluded "Blade II isn't all bad. It has its moments and fans of the character will be content, but not overjoyed with the title. Hardcore and casual gamers alike, however, will tire of it very quickly". Steve Steinberg wrote of the Xbox version's combat system, "it probably made more sense in theory than it does in actual application", calling it "the stick version of button-mashing". He also criticized the AI, saying: "The game would have been far better with fewer, but more intelligent, enemies. As it is, it's just you against wave after wave of poorly developed enemies". He concluded: "Ultimately, Blade II plays more like a platformer for adults than like an action title [...] Clean up some of the rough language, give Blade a big, bulbous, cutesy head, and replace the millions of vampires per level with an equal number of collectible trinkets and you'll have something the Nintendo crowd can tackle when they're done with the latest Mario romp".

GameSpot's Jeff Gerstmann said, "Blade II has some of the worst enemy AI so far this year". He was critical of the graphics, the sound and the controls, concluding, "if you find yourself out shopping for some Blade II-related items, take a pass on the game and stick to the movie. Poor AI, dull design, and lackluster presentation all add up to make Blade II a game that you should definitely skip".

IGN's Jeremy Dunham said of the PS2 version that "there isn't much to find beyond the horrendous controls and suspiciously bad gameplay". He was critical of the control system, saying "admirable as the attempt at a new attack system may be, we think that a more traditional method of attack would have been a better way to go". He was also critical of the graphics, and concluded, "Blade II has turned into our most recent poster child for how NOT to make a movie-licensed videogame". Hilary Goldstein was equally unimpressed with the Xbox version. He too was critical of the combat system, finding it too limiting: "The combat system seems to be begging for more. Chains, grabs, fluidity. But those things are absent. Because you have to use the thumbstick, and because the thumbstick represents the direction of an attack and the attack itself, combat seems very stilted". He was also critical of the story, missions and AI, referring to the game as "a momentary distraction in video game life".

Tokyo Drifter of GamePro called the PlayStation 2 version "a subpar game that will frustrate even die-hard fans." He also said that the Xbox version "has a lot of good raw materials, but the end product doesn't congeal into a bloody good time. Even die-hard fans of the Daywalker will be disappointed." (Note: GamePro gave the game 4/5 for graphics, two 3.5/5 scores for sound and control, and 2.5/5 for fun factor on both platforms.)

=== Sales ===
Blade II was a commercial failure, selling less than half a million units across both platforms. Its failure was indirectly responsible for the closure of Mucky Foot Productions. When Mucky Foot acquired the Blade franchise, they had already developed two commercial failures: Urban Chaos and Startopia, both of which had been published by Eidos Interactive. Mucky Foot wanted to make Urban Chaos 2, but Eidos were not especially interested. According to company director Gary Carr:

Mucky Foot had two strikes. We weren't actually making money. We were just taking lots of money to make games, which weren't selling lots. We took [the Blade] contract on to kind of - I suppose - keep Mucky Foot alive. At the time, Eidos were turning their back on us - they were starting to retract. We could see them physically retracting from us. We signed the game for our own survival, to some degree.

However, because the game had to be ready to ship to coincide with the DVD release of the film in North America, development was rushed, and the game was released before the developers were fully happy with it. After finishing with Blade II, Mucky Foot began work on two more film adaptations: Bulletproof Monk for Empire Interactive and The Punisher for THQ. THQ were unimpressed with Blade II and cancelled The Punisher, which left Mucky Foot unable to complete Bulletproof Monk without letting staff go. They spent several months re-pitching Sky Ships, the game which had developed into Blade II, to various publishers, but were unable to generate any interest, and the company closed in October 2003.
