= Theme Park World =

1999 video game

- Developer: Bullfrog Productions (Note: Ported to PlayStation and PlayStation 2 by Climax Development, and Mac OS by Zonic)
- Publisher: Electronic Arts (Note: PlayStation 2 version released under the EA Games brand. Published on Mac OS by Feral Interactive.)
- Producer: Jeff Gamon
- Composer: James Hannigan
- Platforms: Microsoft Windows; PlayStation; PlayStation 2; Mac OS
- Release: Microsoft Windows: NA: 3 November 1999; EU: 19 November 1999; PlayStation: JP: 16 March 2000; NA: 22 March 2000; EU: 24 March 2000; PlayStation 2: NA: 5 December 2000; EU: 8 December 2000; Mac OS: NA: 8 December 2000
- Genre: Construction and management simulation
- Mode: Single-player

Theme Park World, also known as Theme Park 2, and in North America as Sim Theme Park, is a 1999 construction and management simulation game developed by Bullfrog Productions and released by Electronic Arts. The direct sequel to Theme Park (Theme Hospital and Theme Aquarium are thematic sequels), the player constructs and manages an amusement park to make a profit and keep visitors happy. Initially developed for Windows, it was ported to PlayStation and PlayStation 2 (whose version was titled Theme Park Roller Coaster in North America), as well for Macintosh computers. The Mac version was published by Feral Interactive.

The game was developed because personnel at Bullfrog wanted to bring the original Theme Park up-to-date. Theme Park World contains four different themed areas to build amusement parks in, the ability to ride attractions, and an online service that enabled players to share parks. Reception was mostly positive, with reviewers complimenting the sound and visuals, although some were critical of the interface. The game was followed by Theme Park Inc (also known as SimCoaster) in 2001.

== Gameplay ==
A typical Lost Kingdom park. At the bottom right is the advisor.

Theme Park World tasks players with managing a series of amusement parks. To do this, the player must choose how to spend their funds, finding ways to expand the number and scope of their parks while remaining profitable. Money can be used to purchase things such as new rides or attractions, and hire staff to maintain the park. As in its predecessor Theme Park, the staff available for recruitment include mechanics, cleaners (known in some versions as handymen), entertainers, and guards, but Theme Park World also introduces a new role: scientists (known in some versions as researchers). The staff repair rides, clean litter, entertain visitors, ensure the park's security and research new rides, shops, and attractions. Staff can be trained to make them more efficient, and require frequent rest in staff rooms.

Rides can be upgraded to increase their reliability, capacity, and speed, as well as provide additional components for track-based rides, such as jumps and tunnels for race tracks, and loops for roller coasters. Toilets and features such as bins, speakers, and security cameras can also be purchased. Various elements can be controlled by the player, such as the name of the park, the price of admission, the layout of the roller-coaster tracks, and the quality of goods in the shops. The player can build cafés, novelty stores, restaurants, and parlours for foodstuff such as chips (fries), ice creams, and burgers. In the PlayStation version, certain rides and sideshows are playable as minigames such as races and 9 puzzles. The player can take loans and purchase additional land for the park.

A key focus is maintaining visitor satisfaction: the player is provided with feedback on visitors' merriment in the forms of a happiness meter, and thought bubbles. The bubbles convey feelings such as confusion, pleasure, hunger, and hygiene, which are indicators of the park's success. There is an advisor who provides tutorials and information about the park's events.

The player can earn golden tickets or keys for completing tasks such as getting a certain number of people in the park, reaching a certain happiness level, and making a certain profit in a year. Golden tickets can be used to buy special rides that cannot otherwise be researched by park scientists, as well as unlock golden keys needed to open additional parks. The requirements for earning golden tickets are similar in each park, but get harder as the game progresses. There are four themes of park: Lost Kingdom (featuring mainly Mesozoic, but also Aztec, Mayan, and Ape-based rides) Wonder Land (described as a "fairy kingdom"), Halloween World, and Space Zone, with Space Zone being the hardest. In the PlayStation version, there are two parks for each theme. Each world has setting-appropriate rides, shops, and sideshows. Only the Lost Kingdom and Halloween World are available at the start (in the PlayStation version, the players start in the Lost Kingdom).

The player can ride on rides, and tour the park in the first-person view. In the PlayStation version, four golden tickets are required to use these features.

There is also an Instant Action mode, in which the player starts with a pre-built park in the Lost Kingdom, some staff, and double the usual amount of money. It features automatic research and cheaper staff, tracks, and expansion, but certain rides, shops, sideshows, upgrades, and features are not available.

=== Theme Park World Online ===
The Theme Park World Online website contained news and updates to the game, and featured a page that contained published parks. Invitations to parks could be issued, and players could vote for their favourites. Competitions were hosted, with prizes awarded for the best parks. Players could also visit others' published parks. Platinum Tickets, which were used to download rides from the website, were awarded when others visited the player's parks. Postcards could be sent by email, and the service offered a chat feature. The chat service had a function to report abusive players, who would have their connection terminated. Players could also be blackmarked. An account was required to use Theme Park World Online.

== Development ==
Theme Park World was announced (as Theme Park 2) in April 1999. Many Bullfrog personnel had wanted to produce an updated version of Theme Park. Producer Jeff Gamon said that and that players wanted to ride rides they created and Bullfrog built on the original game's success using the latest technology. Gamon also said that Theme Park World would be less objective-based and more open-ended than the previous Theme games. Early in development, there were 12 artists, who were led by Darran Thomas before he left Bullfrog with Jeremy Longley and Glenn Corpes to found Lost Toys.

The game used a 3D engine to eliminate the need for a 3D accelerator card, and an advanced behavioural artificial intelligence system (programmed by Ben Board) that gave visitors different behavioural traits. Board said that the most important feature was the queuing behaviour, and that he spent a while making it look interesting when visitors were in long queues. Many management features of the original game were retained, but some, such as supply ordering and competition with other parks, were removed. Staff would no longer get strike action because it was considered confusing and annoying.

Theme Park World originally used the Populous: The Beginning engine, but it was "limiting", and a new one was built. Most of the development team were from Mindscape: they were brought to Bullfrog to complete Dark Omen. After Theme Resort was cancelled, its team joined the people from Mindscape to develop Theme Park 2. As of October 1999, development of the PlayStation version was two months behind the PC version, and there was a greater emphasis placed on the minigames to compensate for its lack of internet connectivity. The internet connectivity and the ability to ride on rides were developed in response to criticism of the original game's repetitiveness.

In August 1999, Theme Park World was renamed as Sim Theme Park for North America, and was released as part of Maxis' (a sister company of Bullfrog) Sim line. The renaming was to make the game easy to recognise by all types of gamer. Bullfrog General Manager Bruce McMillan said that the Theme series was much stronger in Europe and Asia than North America, and the re-branding would inform gamers of the type of gaming experience the game would offer. He also said they were pleased to work with Maxis, which would allow the game to become popular in the United States. Luc Barthelet, Maxis' General Manager, said Theme Park World "is a great game" and that he was pleased to have it as part of the Sim series, but expressed jealousy at Bullfrog for developing such a game before Maxis.

Theme Park World was released for Microsoft Windows on 3 November 1999. The Japanese version was published by Electronic Arts Square. It was released on Macintosh by Feral Interactive on 8 December 2000. The PlayStation version (developed by Climax Studios) was released on 22 March 2000 (16 March in Japan), and the PlayStation 2 (titled Theme Park Roller Coaster in North America) version was released on 5 December 2000 in North America and 8 December 2000 in Europe (28 December 2000 in Japan) The European PS1 and PS2 versions were released in July 2000 and December 2000, respectively. Theme Park World was released on the PlayStation Portable and PlayStation 3 via the PlayStation Store in North America on 11 February 2010, and in Japan on 24 December 2009.

The adviser is voiced by Lewis MacLeod in UK release.

== Reception ==
Reception

Aggregate score
Aggregator	Score
GameRankings	77% (PC)

Review scores
Publication	Score
Computer Gaming World	4.5/5 (PC)
Computer and Video Games	3/5 (PC)
GameSpot	8/10 (PC); 8.3/10 (PlayStation 2)
IGN	8.4/10 (PC); 8.5/10 (PlayStation); 8.4/10 (PlayStation 2)
Next Generation	4/5 (PC); 2/5 (PS); 4/5 (PS2)
PC Zone	70% (PC)
Jeuxvideo.com	15/20 (PC); 15/20 (PlayStation); 15/20 (PlayStation 2)
FiringSquad	4/5 (PC)
Absolute Playstation	71% (PlayStation)
Génération 4	5/6 (PC)
Game Revolution	2.5/5 (PC)
Inside Mac Games	8.75/10 (Macintosh)

Theme Park World received generally positive reviews, though it failed to match the success of its predecessor. In North America, it sold 309,516 units and earned $8.51 million from January through October 2000, according to PC Data. These figures rose to 563,299 units and $13.08 million by the end of 2000, which made Sim Theme Park the region's eighth-best-selling computer game for the year. In 2001, the game took ninth in the United States for the year, with sales of 514,288 units ($9.92 million). The game was later given a "Platinum" sales award by the Entertainment and Leisure Software Publishers Association (ELSPA), indicating sales of at least 300,000 copies in the United Kingdom.

The PC version was praised highly by Robert Coffey of Computer Gaming World: he believed the game is "Wildly entertaining" and liked the ability to tour parks and ride rides. His only real criticism was the difficulty of constructing roller coasters. The game was awarded the Editors' Choice award. A reviewer from IGN described the presentation as "clear, concise, and fun", and was impressed with the sound. Ron Dulin of GameSpot also liked the "amusing" visual appeal, but complained about the amount of detail the player must manage once the park becomes popular, and said it takes away the enjoyment of the player's creation. Computer and Video Games's criticism was that the game is much more freeform than Theme Hospital: he said no specific goals are presented, and that golden tickets are often won suddenly. PC Zone's reviewer complained that the player cannot build more than one of the same item at a time, and must keep re-entering the menus and select it again. He also described the adviser as "incredibly annoying", and the rides as "tamer than a sedated penguin". Despite these criticisms, Theme Park World was also described as "Very addictive". Jeuxvideo.com's reviewer thought Theme Park World is better than the original due to the 3D graphics, and also praised Bullfrog's humour, but also described the appearance as "repetitive". Bob Colayco of FiringSquad found the 3D graphics as colourful, and liked the refined user interface, describing it as "context sensitive" and believed that hotkeys play a greater role than in the previous game. He believed the game is "cuter" than RollerCoaster Tycoon. Génération 4's Rémy Goavec was highly complimentary: he said Theme Park World was "a real treat" and "possibly the best Christmas gift Bullfrog could give". It was also described as "beautiful", "funny", and "intelligent". Theme Park World was more heavily criticised by Ben Silverman of Game Revolution: he liked the graphics, but described the adviser's advice as "worse than a nagging housewife". He also complained about the lack of variety, and said that the rides are repeated across the four worlds. Daniel Erickson of Next Generation stated that "hardcore sim fans might miss having to trade stocks and manage land grants, but everyone else is in for a treat".

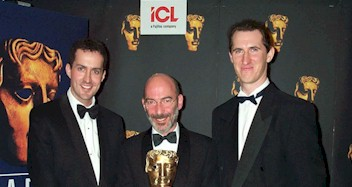
James Hannigan, Richard Joseph and Nick Laviers after receiving the award on stage for Sound at the BAFTA Interactive Awards, 2000.

The PlayStation version was described by IGN's Sam Bishop as "a fantastic game". He thought the sound is "fantastic" and the adviser's voice acting is "perfect", but criticised the sprites as not becoming more detailed as the player zooms in, making close-up views a "pixeled horror". Absolute PlayStation said the music is repetitive, and disagreed with IGN on the adviser by describing him as "infuriating". A staff member described the game as "just more of the same". Jeuxvideo.com's reviewer thought the PlayStation version's gameplay is "mediocre", and criticised the interface for being too complex, although the action was described as "rich". Eric Bratcher reviewed the PlayStation version for Next Generation, and stated that "although there's nothing else like it on PlayStation this sluggish, homely, online version of a great PC title would have been much better suited for the next-generation systems".

The PlayStation 2 version was described by a reviewer of Jeuxvideo.com as "a very good simulation game", and he also said the graphics were good, but could have been "more beautiful". IGN's Doug Perry said the PlayStation 2 version is smoother than the PC version, and praised its "laptop" interface. He described the game as "a fun, clean addictive game that's intelligent and highly amusing". Jeff Gerstmann of GameSpot liked the fact the PlayStation 2 version's goals are made clear, and believed the music fits the parks well and the fact that it has multiple parks made it great for players who like to play for short periods.

Eric Bratcher reviewed the PlayStation 2 version of the game for Next Generation, rating it four stars out of five, and said that "a stripped-down PC sim that shared the strange, hypnotic appeal of amusement parks themselves – you can't logically explain why you're there, but you'll find yourself captivated, unable to wipe the smile from your face". This version of the game won GameSpot's annual "Best Simulation Game" award among console games.

The Macintosh version was believed to be "just plain fun" by Michael Phillips of Inside Mac Games, who also praised the vibrant graphics. He also complimented the music as "themeparkish", and said it adds to the game's mood.

Theme Park World for PC was awarded the 2000 BAFTA Interactive Entertainment Award for Sound at the time recognising all aspects of Sound and Music in games. The award was collected on stage by composer James Hannigan, Richard Joseph and Nick Laviers of Electronic Arts.

== See also ==
- RollerCoaster Tycoon
