= Flood (video game) =

1990 video game

- Cover art
- Developer: Bullfrog Productions
- Publisher: Electronic Arts
- Designer: Sean Cooper
- Artist: Simon Hunter
- Composer: Charles Callet
- Platforms: Amiga, Atari ST
- Release: June 1990
- Genre: Platform
- Mode: Single-player

Flood is a 1990 platform game developed by Bullfrog Productions. It was published for the Amiga and Atari ST by Electronic Arts. The objective is to collect all the litter and find the exit to the level.

== Plot ==
The player controls a character named Quiffy who is the last of his race of small green creatures. He lives underground in a series of sewers and tunnels. His mission is to reach the surface by navigating all the sewers, whilst they are slowly flooding. Quiffy can walk on walls and ceilings.

== Gameplay ==
Quiffy must collect all of the various pieces of litter on the level and then find the exit to complete each level. In general the litter is not particularly hidden, it is just distributed around the level. Quiffy can climb on most walls and ceilings, and swim through water. He has energy which depletes upon touching dangerous objects, but can also die instantly when touching any of the few lethal objects. Although he can swim and has the appearance of an amphibious life-form, he can only breathe above water and will start to drown if he runs out of air.

In each level, the player is followed by the ghost of Aunt Matilda, copying the player's movements and starts off about 15 seconds behind. However, she is very slightly faster and will eventually catch up. Touching the ghost will hurt Quiffy. Quiffy starts each level with no weapon, and can pick up any of five available weapons. He can only hold one of these at any time and if he picks up another one, it will swap for the current one.

Most of the levels have taps in them, which pour water in to the level. The modelling of the water was quite advanced for a home computer game of its time: the water will flow to the lowest point that it can and when multiple taps are pouring water in one place, it will fill up proportionally fast. A lot of levels feature taps in all areas so the entire level will eventually flood, leaving Quiffy with no available source of air. This aspect is how the game derives its title. There are various enemies on each level, some of which have special properties. In general the enemies move around in a specific pattern, and when killed will throw a heart up which will return health to Quiffy.

== Reception ==
The game was reviewed in 1990 in Dragon #164 by Hartley, Patricia, and Kirk Lesser in "The Role of Computers" column. The reviewers gave the game 4 out of 5 stars.
