= Music of the Fable series =

Soundtrack for the first Fable game.

Fable is a series of action role-playing video games developed by Lionhead Studios and published by Microsoft Studios for Xbox, Xbox 360, Windows, and Mac OS X platforms. The music of the Fable series is the soundtrack to all three games.

== Fable Original Soundtrack ==
Fable Original soundtrack

Soundtrack album
- Released: February 15, 2005
- Length: 49:45
- Label: Sumthing Else Music Works
- Producer: Russell Shaw

The Fable Original Soundtrack was released on February 15, 2005, for Lionhead's 2004 game Fable. The orchestral score was composed by Russell Shaw with Danny Elfman assisting on the theme. The soundtrack was also performed by The Philharmonia Orchestra and The Pinewood Singers, under the orchestration and conduction of Allan Wilson. The music only covers the original Fable game and does not contain any of the new music heard in The Lost Chapters.

Fable Original Soundtrack
No.	Title	Music	Length
1.	"Fable Theme"	Shaw/Elfman	3:27
2.	"Oakvale"	Shaw	3:25
3.	"Darkwood"	Shaw	4:10
4.	"Witchwood"	Shaw	3:10
5.	"Lychfield Cemetery"	Shaw	4:31
6.	"Summer Fields"	Shaw	4:04
7.	"Bowerstone"	Shaw	4:34
8.	"Arena"	Shaw	2:06
9.	"Temple of Light"	Shaw	2:38
10.	"Hobbes Cave"	Shaw	3:57
11.	"Greatwood"	Shaw	3:15
12.	"Guild"	Shaw	5:29
13.	"Fresco Dome"	Shaw	4:59
Total length:			49:45

== Fable II Original Soundtrack ==
Fable II Original soundtrack

Soundtrack album
- Released: November 25, 2008
- Length: 45:08
- Label: Sumthing Else Music Works
- Producer: Russell Shaw

The Fable II Original Soundtrack was released on November 25, 2008, for Lionhead's 2008 game, Fable II. The orchestral score was composed by Russell Shaw with Danny Elfman assisting on the theme. The music only covers the original Fable game and does not contain any of the new music heard in the Downloadable Content.

Fable II Original Soundtrack
No.	Title	Music	Length
1.	"Fable Theme"	Shaw/Elfman	1:42
2.	"Old Town"	Shaw	3:01
3.	"Bowerstone Cemetery"	Shaw	3:58
4.	"Bowerlake"	Shaw	6:22
5.	"Wraithmarsh"	Shaw/Elfman	4:08
6.	"Fairfax Castle"	Shaw	2:26
7.	"Westcliff"	Shaw	3:45
8.	"Oakfield"	Shaw	3:38
9.	"Bowerstone Market"	Shaw	4:28
10.	"Shadow of Evil"	Shaw	4:26
11.	"Howling Halls"	Shaw	4:29
12.	"Marcus Memorial"	Shaw	2:45
Total length:			45:08

== Fable III Original Soundtrack ==
Fable III Original soundtrack

Soundtrack album
- Released: October 26, 2010
- Length: 1:12:18
- Label: Sumthing Else Music Works
- Producer: Russell Shaw

The Fable III soundtrack was released by Sumthing Else Music Works on October 26, 2010. The soundtrack was modelled after the game Fable III was released by Lionhead Studios in October 2010. The game is the third installment of the Fable series and is placed five decades after the game before it, Fable II. The entire album was created by British composer and sound designer Russell Shaw and performed by the Slovak National Symphony Orchestra.

Fable III Original Soundtrack
No.	Title	Music	Length
1.	"Fable III Theme"	Shaw	2:54
2.	"A Hero Awakes"	Shaw	2:23
3.	"Keyhole"	Shaw	2:54
4.	"Elise"	Shaw	1:16
5.	"Escape"	Shaw	5:00
6.	"Theresa"	Shaw	1:05
7.	"Fight or Flight"	Shaw	2:42
8.	"The Dwellers"	Shaw	4:19
9.	"Sanctuary"	Shaw	3:54
10.	"Sabine"	Shaw	1:19
11.	"Brightwall"	Shaw	2:55
12.	"Reliquary"	Shaw	4:57
13.	"Music Box"	Shaw	0:39
14.	"Driftwood"	Shaw	2:23
15.	"Reaver Mansion"	Shaw	11:13
16.	"Shadelight"	Shaw	3:18
17.	"Desert"	Shaw	4:54
18.	"Kalin"	Shaw	4:59
19.	"Coronation"	Shaw	0:55
20.	"Logan's Trial"	Shaw	2:28
21.	"Execution"	Shaw	1:23
22.	"Death of Walter"	Shaw	2:47
23.	"Farewell Walter"	Shaw	0:56
24.	"Finale"	Shaw	0:45
Total length:			1:12:18
