= Magic Carpet 2 =

1995 video game

Magic Carpet 2: The Netherworlds
- European cover art
- Developer: Bullfrog Productions
- Publisher: Electronic Arts
- Director: Alan Wright
- Designer: Peter Molyneux
- Programmer: Alan Wright
- Artist: Eoin Rogan
- Composer: Russell Shaw
- Platform: MS-DOS
- Release: EU: 1995; NA: September 8, 1996
- Genre: Action
- Modes: Single-player, multiplayer

Magic Carpet 2: The Netherworlds is a 1995 video game, the sequel to the Magic Carpet. It was developed by Bullfrog and published by Electronic Arts. It was re-released in 2013 on GOG.com with support for Windows and macOS.

== Plot ==
The apprentice's master, who died after unleashing his deadly spell, was being spied upon by the Netherworld's ruler, Vissiluth, who is now intent on conquering the world of the living. It's once again up to this apprentice to stop him, by battling this demon.

The NPC wizards are now considered to be Vissiluth's lackeys. They are all based in a city just before Vissiluth's seat of power. After the enemy wizards are vanquished, the apprentice takes an underground passage to reach Vissiluth's citadel. After the apprentice destroys the citadel, Vissiluth emerges and the two do battle. Upon emerging victorious, a volcano spews out mana in all different colours.

== Gameplay ==
Magic Carpet 2 fixed many of the design complaints present in the first Magic Carpet. The basic concept of the game remains the same as Magic Carpet, with the player being able to build a castle, collect mana, destroy creatures for their mana and battle rival sorcerers.

It adds night-time levels, and underground levels, which not only helped alleviate the repetitiveness of the preceding game, but also accompanied the storyline progression, which was mapped out before each level. Underground levels, however, do not have rival wizards. There are also several secret entrances to reach hidden levels, where the player can gain more spells and experience.

Also unlike its predecessor, the game proceeds by completing various missions such as reaching checkpoints and destroying specific buildings/monsters, rather than just simple accumulation of mana.

The multiplayer mode supports both modem and local area network play.

== Development ==
A version for the Panasonic M2 was in the works, but it never released due to the system's cancellation.

== Reception ==
Reception

Review scores
Publication	Score
AllGame	3.5/5
Next Generation	4/5
PCMag	3/4
CD Player	9/10
PC Games	B

A Next Generation critic assessed that despite the improvements to the interface, addition of level objectives, modifications to the game engine, and improved graphics, Magic Carpet 2 plays the same as the original Magic Carpet. Concluding that "if you loved the first Magic Carpet, this one is definitely for you", he gave it four out of five stars. Rating it three out of four stars, PC Magazine praised the graphics' quality and speed but advised those susceptible to motion sickness from first-person games to avoid the game.

In 1996, GamesMaster rated the game 27th on its "Top 100 Games of All Time", one place below the original Magic Carpet.
