= Battle Engine Aquila =

2003 video game

- European Windows cover art
- Developer: Lost Toys
- Publishers: Infogrames Europe (Note: Released under the Atari brand name.); Encore Software (Windows); Evolved Games (Windows)
- Producer: Jeremy Longley
- Designers: Alex Trowers; Darren Thomas
- Programmers: Stuart Gillam; Glenn Corpes
- Artist: Jeremy Elford
- Composer: Nathan McCree
- Platforms: PlayStation 2 Xbox; Windows
- Release: PlayStation 2, Xbox: NA: 27 January 2003; EU: 28 February 2003; Windows: NA: 23 October 2003; EU: 8 April 2004
- Genres: First-person shooter, simulation
- Modes: Single-player, multiplayer

Battle Engine Aquila is a 2003 video game for PlayStation 2 and Xbox developed by Lost Toys and published by Infogrames Europe. In the game the player pilots the Battle Engine for the Forseti military in their wars against the Muspell to decide who will rule what's left of the world. Battle Engine Aquila received little attention from the public despite overall good reviews from critics. It was listed as #86 in the Top 100 Games for PlayStation 2 by IGN. A later Microsoft Windows port was published by Encore Software.

== Setting ==
The ice caps on the planet Allium have melted due to the greenhouse effect. As a result, most of the planet's surface ended up underwater. Only 13 islands scattered across the surface remain and only two civilizations of Allium's human-like inhabitants are left: the peaceful and technological Forseti and the aggressive Muspell. Both civilizations are at the brink of war with each other in a battle over the remaining landmasses.

== Story ==
The player assumes the role of Hawk Winter, a Forseti dockworker. He is also a dock racer where he races on his loader. After one of the races Tatiana Kiralova, a friend of Hawk's and an overseer of the Aquila program, persuades colonel Chuck Kramer, the leader of the Forseti Air Force, to secretly assign Hawk to pilot the Battle Engine.

War erupts with the Muspell attacking RI-04 island close to Forseti Major, the homeland of Forseti, and home of the Aquila program R&D facilities. The player wipes out the whole Muspell strike force in time to fight the rest of the war.

== Gameplay ==
The Battle Engine has two modes of operation: "Jet mode" allows the Battle Engine to fly for a limited time, while "Walker mode" transforms the Battle Engine into a mech-like walking tank. When the Battle Engine is in Walker Mode, its weapons are considerably stronger than when it is in Jet Mode, and is tougher but much slower.

There are 4 different types of Battle Engine that one may choose to pilot: Pulsar, Blazer, Lancer and Sniper. There are multiple weapons that are available for the Battle Engines that can be used. The Sniper Battle Engine only has 1 airborne weapon (the others have two each), the Vulcan Cannon, but it is the only ship that can engage a stealth mode, rendering it invisible. This capability drains the energy of the Battle Engine, in a similar fashion to the Jet Mode.

The campaign provides at least 8 hours gameplay on the easiest difficulty, and each level presents a new threat or dilemma to tackle. There are a variety of boss - style unique enemies that play key roles on the battlefield, and a good variety of standard units to take on as well. The story's narrative and the characters within do little to enhance the game's entertainment value.

The battles themselves are well simulated, with beach landings, ambushes and airborne landing craft, artillery raining down from naval forces while bombers and fighters engage each other overhead.

The game also involves some strategic thinking, giving the players the option of what targets to prioritize rather than giving them a specific objective. The players may at any point choose to take out the enemies factories, distract their fighters, harass incoming landing craft or pick off specific targets.

== Reception ==
Reception

Aggregate score
Aggregator	Score		
Aggregator	PC	PS2	Xbox
Metacritic	65/100	73/100	76/100

Review scores
Publication	Score		
Publication	PC	PS2	Xbox
Computer Games Magazine	3/5	N/A	N/A
Computer Gaming World	3/5	N/A	N/A
Electronic Gaming Monthly	N/A	N/A	7.5/10
Eurogamer	N/A	N/A	8/10
Game Informer	N/A	7/10	7/10
GamePro	N/A	3.5/5	4/5
GameRevolution	N/A	B	B
GameSpot	6.1/10	6.7/10	6.7/10
GameSpy	3/5	3/5	3/5
GameZone	7.9/10	7.5/10	8.2/10
IGN	7.2/10	8/10	8/10
Official U.S. PlayStation Magazine	N/A	3.5/5	N/A
Official Xbox Magazine (US)	N/A	N/A	8.3/10
PC Gamer (US)	60%	N/A	N/A

The Xbox version received "generally favorable reviews", while the PC and PlayStation 2 versions received "mixed or average reviews", according to the review aggregation website Metacritic. Edge gave the PS2 and Xbox versions 7 out of 10. GamePro gave the PS2 version an average review over a month before the game's release.

Despite positive critical reception, Battle Engine Aquila received poor sales. IGN ranked it as the 86th best PlayStation 2 game.
