= Hi-Octane =

1995 video game

- Developer: Bullfrog Productions
- Publisher: Electronic Arts
- Producer: Sean Cooper
- Designers: Barry Meade; Alex Trowers
- Programmers: Sean Cooper; Mark Huntley
- Composer: Russell Shaw
- Platforms: MS-DOS, PlayStation, Saturn
- Release: MS-DOS: NA: August 1995; EU: July 1995; PlayStation: NA: December 29, 1995; EU: December 1995; Saturn: NA: December 1995; EU: December 1995; JP: March 22, 1996
- Genres: Racing, vehicular combat
- Modes: Single-player, multiplayer

Hi-Octane is a 1995 vehicular combat and racing video game published by Electronic Arts for MS-DOS, PlayStation, and Sega Saturn. It was developed by Bullfrog Productions based upon their earlier Magic Carpet game code. The tracks are wider and more open than most racing games. Hi-Octane was not as well received as the thematically similar Wipeout by Psygnosis and was criticized for the short view distance. Bullfrog also released an expansion pack with three new tracks and new game modes.

== Gameplay ==
Saturn version

The game offers a choice of six hovercraft vehicles differentiated by their top speed, armour, firepower, weight and appearance: KD-1 Speeder, Berserker, Jugga, Vampire, Outrider, and Flexiwing. There are six tracks to race on, with names like New Chernobyl which hint at a dystopian futuristic world (although the game does not feature a backstory). The tracks offer different difficulties, various textures and types of landscape like wastelands and city streets. Certain parts of the track allow to recharge vehicle's fuel, shields or ammo, although the vehicle has to slow down in order to fully benefit of the recharge. There are also power-ups on the tracks, recharging fuel/shield/ammo (10, 100 or 200%) or upgrading the car's minigun, missile or booster, for more power. Other parts of the tracks changed in the course of racing, opening shortcuts or places with scattered upgrades for a short time.

The different vehicles display different handling values in the front end but these are just for show, the underlying stats are the same for all the vehicles. Due to the dimensions of models the vehicles appear different sizes but in fact the collision volumes are all identical meaning that you are just as likely to hit something with the Outrider as you are with the Jugga.

There are four camera views, switched while playing: three of them are from behind the vehicle with one being further away than the other, and the fourth view is from the front of the car, with no parts of the car obscuring the sight.

== Development ==
Developer Peter Molyneux stated that in May 1995, EA set Bullfrog under pressure to release Dungeon Keeper in six and a half weeks. "Because I wasn't prepared to sacrifice Dungeon Keeper, I wrote and designed a game from scratch in six weeks: Hi-Octane," Molyneux recounted. To allow the development of the game in such a short time, the Magic Carpet engine was used. Producer Sean Cooper's account is slightly different, stating that the game was developed in eight weeks, as a way to "fill a quarter that didn't have enough revenue". Due to time constraints, all the vehicles actually have the same speed, despite what their stats say in the game.

== Reception ==
Reception

Review scores
Publication	Score
AllGame	2/5 (PS1); 2/5 (SAT)
Electronic Gaming Monthly	8.2/10 (PC)
Famitsu	21/40 (PS1); 22/40 (SAT)
Next Generation	4/5 (PC); 2/5 (SAT, PS1)
Maximum	2/5 (SAT, PS1)
Sega Saturn Magazine	90% (SAT)

Mark LeFebvre of Electronic Gaming Monthly gave the PC version an 8.2, praising the selection of vehicles, the well-balanced challenge, the secret areas, and the networked eight-player racing, though he did remark that there should have been more than six tracks. A critic for Next Generation also considered the small number of tracks to be the game's one shortcoming, and gave it overall approval for its use of texture mapping and Gouraud shading, sense of speed, and overall fun gameplay.

Maximum deemed the Saturn version "a mildly entertaining but graphically impoverished title for fans of the original only." They criticized the port's many graphical shortcomings, particularly the jerky frame rate, heavy slowdown in two-player mode, lack of texture mapping on enemy craft, and clipping polygon scenery which can cause the player's craft to become stuck. They also took issue with the control configuration and bizarre "hot seat" multiplayer mode, though they praised the additional courses and selection of cars. In contrast, Rad Automatic of Sega Saturn Magazine called it "a brilliant title", applauding the varied abilities and handling of the vehicles, the combat elements, the assortment of multiplayer modes, and the hover vehicle physics. While noting that the conversion was not as outstanding as Sega's arcade ports, he nonetheless found it of acceptable quality. GamePro concurred with Maximum that the game has a strong selection of cars and tracks but poor graphics. They also criticized the loose, unresponsive controls and the sounds. Next Generation likewise commented that "With its blocky graphics, devilishly slow frame-rate, and nebulous controls, Hi-Octane simply lacks the focus of most console games." He added that the game was very similar to, but clearly inferior to, its contemporaries Cyber Speedway and Wipeout. However, he also stated that "One truly awesome concept introduced ... is the realtime morphing tracks which add a great deal to the game's challenge and is sure to be a feature copied in future racing titles."

Reviewing the PlayStation version, GamePro said the game is "crippled by gummy controls and slow, repetitive gameplay. Flat, unimaginative graphics and sounds cause further problems. Stick with Wipeout - Hi-Octane runs out of gas." Maximum criticized that the drop in frame rate when using the new split screen multiplayer makes the game "virtually unplayable" and, like GamePro and Next Generation, they compared the game unfavorably to Wipeout: "Whereas WipeOut required genuine skill to master its cornering and overtaking, the courses in Hi-Octane have less involving [sic] and, with the exception of the odd shortcut, there's very little else to surprise. ... WipeOut and Ridge Racer have shown the potential for PlayStation racers, and the Bullfrog offering comes across as little more than a weak PC port."
