= Lost Toys =

British video game developer

Lost Toys Ltd.
- Industry: Interactive entertainment
- Predecessor: Bullfrog Productions
- Founded: March 1999
- Founders: Glenn Corpes; Jeremy Longley; Darran Thomas
- Defunct: 2 October 2003
- Fate: Dissolved
- Headquarters: Guildford, England
- Key people: Glenn Corpes (director and lead designer); Jeremy Longley (managing director); Darran Thomas (director and head of art)
- Products: Ball Breakers; Battle Engine Aquila
- Website: www.losttoys.com:80

Lost Toys Ltd. was a British video game developer founded in March 1999 by Glenn Corpes, Jeremy Longley, and Darran Thomas, all of whom had previously worked for Bullfrog Productions. Les Edgar helped by providing financial support. Lost Toys was the third Bullfrog break-off group, after Mucky Foot Productions and Lionhead Studios, and was founded due to disillusionment after Electronic Arts purchased Bullfrog.

The company produced two games: Ball Breakers (Moho in Europe), and Battle Engine Aquila. In May 2003, Geoff Crammond chose Lost Toys as a partner to develop Stunt Car Racer Pro. Lost Toys closed on 2 October of the same year, and the game was never released.

== History ==
Thomas stated that Bullfrog's working culture changed considerably after Electronic Arts' takeover, and Corpes believed that is more efficient to develop games on one's own. He also said that, with Mucky Foot Productions and Lionhead Studios running their own affairs the way Bullfrog used to, it was "quite embarrassing to still be working for the Borg". Alex Trowers, a designer at Bullfrog who joined Lost Toys, said that the reason people were leaving Bullfrog was "because it was EA, not Bullfrog", and that Lost Toys intended to go back to developing games for its own sake rather than to keep shareholders satisfied. Corpes also commented that Lost Toys was partially his take on what Bullfrog was, as opposed to Mucky Foot, which he said was Guy Simmons, Mike Diskett, and Fin McGechie's take, and Lionhead, which he said was Peter Molyneux's take. Longley believed that small teams (Corpes said that they intended to have a maximum of 20 employees) were valuable to the gaming industry and that they could work creatively like Bullfrog. He also said that it was encouraging to see Mucky Foot and Lionhead break off from Bullfrog successfully. Early on, Les Edgar provided financial support to the group.

Lost Toys' first title, MoHo (known in North America as Ball Breakers) was released by Take Two Interactive for the Sony PlayStation in August 2000 under the Rockstar label, with PC and Sega Dreamcast versions following later that year. European president of Take Two, Kelly Summer, stated that they were impressed with the game's style and design, and that they had found "the best of the best" with Lost Toys. Corpes said that it was "a cool little game" and that it was inspired by Marble Madness. In April 2000, Longley said that MoHo is "a next-generation game on a now-generation platform". MoHo is targeted toward all gamers, and the minimal violence was in line with Bullfrog's philosophy. By early 2002, Lost Toys had 17 employees.

Lost Toys's second title, Battle Engine Aquila, was released on the Xbox and PlayStation 2 by Infogrames in January 2003. According to Edge, Lost Toys' philosophy and small team structure influenced its inception. Longley said that Lost Toys were tempted to have it feature an apple with a worm, referring to Black & White demos. In May 2003, it was revealed that Lost Toys had created an enhanced version for NVIDIA's GeForce FX 5900 and signed an OEM deal, and that Geoff Crammond has selected Lost Toys to be his company Simergy's partner in developing Stunt Car Racer Pro, and would be responsible for its art and graphics. Crammond chose Lost Toys because of their "proven track record of producing great multiformat titles on time and to budget". In August, Encore signed a publishing deal with Lost Toys to publish the PC version of Battle Engine Aquila. Corpes said that Battle Engine Aquila was "the best thing I ever worked on".

On 2 October of the same year, Lost Toys closed, and all staff were made redundant. Stunt Car Racer Pro was cancelled, and Crammond's business manager said it was "the best game he never sold". According to Crammond, the game had reached a "working demo stage".
