= MoHo =

2000 video game

Ball Breakers
- Developer: Lost Toys
- Publisher: Take-Two Interactive
- Platforms: PlayStation, Dreamcast, Microsoft Windows
- Release: PlayStation: NA: July 27, 2000; UK: August 4, 2000; Windows: EU: November 3, 2000; Dreamcast: EU: November 24, 2000
- Genre: Action video game
- Modes: Single-player, multiplayer

MoHo (known as Ball Breakers in North America) is a video game developed by Lost Toys and published by Take-Two Interactive for PlayStation, Dreamcast, and Microsoft Windows in 2000.

== Reception ==
Reception

Aggregate score
Aggregator	Score		
Aggregator	Dreamcast	PC	PS
GameRankings	N/A	32%	73%

Review scores
Publication	Score		
Publication	Dreamcast	PC	PS
CNET Gamecenter	N/A	N/A	6/10
Edge	N/A	N/A	6/10
EP Daily	N/A	N/A	7/10
Eurogamer	N/A	6/10	7/10
Game Informer	N/A	N/A	3.5/10
GameRevolution	N/A	N/A	B
GameSpot	N/A	N/A	5.3/10
IGN	N/A	N/A	7.5/10
Next Generation	N/A	N/A	3/5
Official U.S. PlayStation Magazine	N/A	N/A	3.5/5
PC Zone	N/A	32%	N/A
The Guardian	N/A	N/A	4/5
Official Dreamcast Magazine UK	3/10	N/A	N/A

The PlayStation version received average reviews, while the PC version received unfavorable reviews, according to the review aggregation website GameRankings. Chris Charla of NextGen called the former version "The Running Man meets Marble Madness: surprisingly fun, especially for less than the cost of two boxes of Cheerios."

Greg Howson of The Guardian commended the gameplay of the PlayStation version, which he described as "mixing Marble Madness, skateboarding and future sport" and "remarkable graphical effects on a machine already drawing its pension." Steve Key of Official Dreamcast Magazine UK described the Dreamcast version's character movement as like "slow, awkward muppets rolling about like a drunken version of It's a Knockout...but with absolutely no fun at all" and stated that it was "probably the most boring game on Dreamcast."
