= Fusion (video game) =

1988 video game

- Developer(s): Bullfrog Productions
- Publisher(s): Electronic Arts
- Producer(s): Joss Ellis
- Programmer(s): Kevin Donkin
- Artist(s): Glenn Corpes
- Composer(s): David Hanlon
- Platform(s): Atari ST, Amiga
- Release: EU: 1988
- Genre(s): Multidirectional shooter

Fusion is a scrolling multidirectional shooter developed by Bullfrog Productions and published by Electronic Arts in 1988 for the Atari ST and Amiga.

== Gameplay ==
It is a scrolling multidirectional shooter with parallax scrolling. The action is viewed from the top. The player controls either a ground-based crawler or a spacecraft. There are thirteen levels.

== Development ==
Fusion was created by Bullfrog Productions, a development studio founded by game designer Peter Molyneux. It was the company's first original product and second game overall, after a port of the shoot 'em up Druid II: Enlightenment. As with Druid II and the later Populous, artist Glenn Corpes created most of the graphics and animation for Fusion, while Molyneux handled the majority of its programming and design. The game was coded in assembly language, and the Atari ST version was developed using HiSoft Systems' Devpac II assembler. Its soundtrack, available on the double-sided disk release, was composed by David Hanlon. Fusion was released in 1988.

== Reception ==
Reception

Review scores
Publication	Score
ACE	607 out of 1000 (Amiga); 712 out of 1000 (ST)
Zzap!64	87%
The Games Machine	62%

Matt Fox, author of The Video Games Guide, summarized Fusion as a "run-of-the-mill shoot 'em up [that] caused few ripples on release". According to Corpes, Fusion was not a commercial success and, together with Druid II, "only brought in a fraction of the money needed to pay the wage bill."

A UK magazine gave the ST version of Fusion a score of 9 out of 10, saying that despite being "yet another vertically scrolling shoot-'em-up" it has "sufficient variation". Bullfrog went on to develop Populous, Magic Carpet and other well-received titles.
