= Startopia =

2001 video game

- European cover art
- Developer: Mucky Foot Productions
- Publisher: Eidos Interactive
- Platform: Microsoft Windows
- Release: UK: June 15, 2001; NA: June 19, 2001
- Genre: Business simulation
- Modes: Single-player, multiplayer

Startopia is a video game by Mucky Foot Productions (formed by ex-Bullfrog employees) and published by Eidos in June 2001, in which the player administers various space stations with the task of developing them into popular hubs. The game has a comical overtone, with lighthearted humour and cartoonish aliens. The game was re-released on GOG.com in September 2012 and was added to the Steam catalogue in October 2013.

Startopia was shortlisted for BAFTA PC Game of the Year in 2001.

== Gameplay ==
A screenshot of the Recreational Deck with buildings such as a Disco, Motels, Bars, Holodome, and Shops

The player is tasked with developing a series of space stations according to the wishes of various employers. The game is set after an apocalyptic galactic war, and many of the stations are in a state of considerable disrepair. It is hinted that these space stations are essentially the last few space-based environments available to the denizens of Startopia, as most of them had been destroyed during the galactic war.

The player has no direct control over the aliens that wander about the station. Instead, it is the player's job to construct rooms and hire aliens to staff them. The rooms provide basic necessities as well as recreation, encouraging visitors to remain on the station and continue spending money. Each type of alien is suited to a particular kind of task, and individual aliens have a set of statistics that determine their value as an employee. The actual goal for the player varies from one scenario to the next; in some scenarios, the player is expected to meet an economic goal, while in other scenarios the player is required to perform a specific task such as converting a certain number of aliens, or taking over the entire station by force. A sandbox mode is also available.

As with most business simulation games, the player builds facilities and hires workers to operate them. Some rooms take care of basic necessities such as food, sanitation, and health care, while others provide entertainment or love. Visitors may be hired by the player to remain on the station and attend to its facilities.

The space station has a toroidal shape, and it is divided by sectors. Additional sectors can be opened by paying a certain amount of energy for repairs. When sectors from two different players are adjacent, they can be opened to allow visitors to move between them. A war can also be started, allowing players to conquer other sectors by hacking an opponent´s sector door using security droids. The space station has three decks:

- The engineering deck is the biggest and the one that allows a biggest variety of building to be constructed.
- At the pleasure deck, buildings for assessing love and fun necessities can be built.
- The bio deck satisfies nature and religion necessities. Additionally, plants can be harvested for obtaining supplies. The deck can be terraformed by modifying temperature, humidity, water level and height.

The player can trade with a merchant called Arona Daal since the start of the game. In order to trade with other species merchants, that provides better prices, the player has to build a star dock and have an active communications center.

Other mechanic of Startopia is research.By hiring Turakken employees and having a research lab, the player can discover new technologies and upgrade those technologies. In order to research a new technology, an object must be introduced in the lab´s analyzer. If the object´s technologies has not discovered yet, the player will get the technology, and the item´s production will be enabled at the factory. If that technology is already researched, it may unlock a new technology from the same brand of the tech tree or improve the current technology, reducing energy cost for producing the item. The analyzer can also disable bombs.When there are not items in the analyzer, the employees will randomly update previously discovered technologies.

In order to maintain the station operational, the player must hire employees among the visitors. Employees are required for the function of some buildings, and some species can also provide defense against enemies, spies and monsters. There are two types of droids: scuzzer droids clean the station, build and repair infrastructures, and move crates, whereas security scuzzers are part of the armed forces of the station, detain or expel criminals and can also hack enemy doors.

In addition to normal visitors, the station can also receive enemy agents. An agent can be disguised as a normal alien or appear as a shady human character sneaking around the station.

Startopia draws inspiration from and makes frequent references to mainstream science fiction, such as Star Trek, 2001: A Space Odyssey (the player's assistant computer VAL is a parody of Space Odyssey's HAL), Red Dwarf, and The Hitchhiker's Guide to the Galaxy. Startopia is dedicated to the memory of Douglas Adams, author of The Hitchhiker's Guide, who died during the game's production.

== Reception ==
John Lee reviewed the PC version of the game for Next Generation, rating it four stars out of five, and stated that "Although a bit short on missions, it turns out to be a real kick to build your own luxury hotel in space.

Startopia received generally favorable reviews upon its release. It holds an average of 85% and 86/100 on aggregate web sites GameRankings and Metacritic.

Startopia sold approximately 110,000 copies.

== Legacy ==
During the August 2019 Gamescom, Realmforge Studios and Kalypso Media announced Spacebase Startopia, a new game based on Startopia. It was scheduled to release on October 23, 2020, for PlayStation 4, Xbox One and Microsoft Windows and in 2021 for Nintendo Switch, would include both competitive and co-operative multiplayer elements. After delays in production, the remake has then been officially released for all platforms on March 26, 2021.
