= Powermonger =

1990 video game

- Developer: Bullfrog Productions
- Publisher: Electronic Arts
- Designers: Peter Molyneux; Glenn Corpes; Kevin Donkin
- Artists: Gary Carr; Simon Hunter
- Composer: Charles Callet
- Platforms: Amiga, Atari ST, PC-98, X68000, MS-DOS, Genesis, FM Towns, SNES, Macintosh, Sega CD
- Release: 1990: Amiga, Atari ST October 1990 MS-DOS, PC-98, X68000 1991 Genesis, FM Towns 1992 SNES 1993 Macintosh, Sega CD 1994
- Genre: Real-time strategy
- Modes: Single-player, multiplayer

Powermonger is a real-time strategy video game developed by Bullfrog Productions and published by Electronic Arts. Originally released in 1990 for the Amiga and Atari ST, it was derived from the Populous engine but presented using a three-dimensional game map.

== Gameplay ==
Screenshot of the Amiga version

The game features a three-dimensional game map, although camera movement is limited to rotating the map by 90 degrees or small discrete intervals and eight pre-defined levels of zoom. Only the map topography itself is three-dimensional; people, trees and other game objects are 2-dimensional sprites.

The game features a fairly advanced "artificial life" engine. Each person seems to have a mind of their own and will go about his or her job, fishing, farming, shepherding, collecting wood or making items without any input from the player. The player can also use a query tool to view the name, sex, age, allegiance, vital stats, hometown and equipment of any given individual. This aspect of the game has some clear resemblances (though less advanced) with the later Black & White game also designed by Peter Molyneux.

While the player cannot form the land as in Populous, actions can still have some limited effect on the environment. For example, if a large area is deforested, the weather pattern will change and more rain or snow (depending on the season) will fall, making movement slower.

The player starts out on each map with a small number of soldiers, and maybe a few towns already under control. To win the map, the balance of power needs to be tipped completely to the player's side – represented by a scale below the mini-map – by conquering most or all of the towns on the map and killing any opposing captains. Once a town is under the player's control, locals can be drafted into the player's army and bigger towns or enemy armies can be taken on. Some of the bigger towns also have neutral captains and if these survive the battle they come under the player's command as well.

The player can only control as many armies as captains, so it is important to keep them alive. If a captain is killed, his army is disbanded and his surviving soldiers go back to their town of origin. Unlike the player's main army – which the main character commands – the subordinate captains have a lag time (indicated by a tiny homing pigeon animation next to their command icon) before their commands are executed. The further away from the player's main character they are, the longer it takes for orders to reach them.

Food is the single most important resource in the game. Aside from friendly towns the player can also slaughter wandering sheep, barter food from neutral towns, or kill an enemy captain and pillage his food supply.

Aside from manpower and food, towns can also provide equipment. Townspeople will occasionally make items but to speed things up the player can order an army to "invent" at a friendly town. Depending on nearby resources and what posture the army is set to (passive, neutral or aggressive), men will then go to work collecting resources and make items. As the more useful items can usually only be made in one or two towns on any given map these have great strategic importance.

There is no micromanagement involved with equipment. Once an army is ordered to equip itself from a pile of equipment it is automatically distributed. If there are bows, swords, and pikes available, soldiers will pick them up in that order. As long as there are soldiers without any weapon in the army no one will pick up more than one weapon. If everyone has something then people with the least valuable weapon will have first pick and so on. The captain carries any excess equipment. There is no limit to how much a captain can carry, but the more he carries the slower he (and his army) will move.

== Expansions ==
In 1991 an expansion pack titled Powermonger: World War I Edition was released, which changed the setting from the conquest of a medieval kingdom, to World War I. World War I Edition retains the core gameplay of Powermonger, but with more ranged weapons and war-machines. More expansion packs with different settings were planned depending on the success of the World War I expansion, but were never released. The unreleased expansions include a fantasy theme, Feudal Japan, and the American Civil War. The fantasy scenario was planned to have a magic system with the ability to create custom spells, and fantasy races such as elves and gnomes.

== Development ==
The Amiga and Atari ST versions of Powermonger cost £29.99 in 1990, and were released in October 1990; the version for IBM PC compatibles was released in 1991. Magazine advertisements for Powermonger quoted Peter Molyneux, who stated that the game is "Better than Populous". A 3DO version was planned but never released.

== Reception ==
Reception

Review scores
| Publication | Score |
|---|---|
| AllGame | 4/5 (PC) |
| Dragon | 5/5 (Amiga, Atari ST) |
| Electronic Gaming Monthly | 6.6/10 (Sega CD) |
| GamePro | 3.37/5 (Sega CD) |
| Computer Gaming World | 3/5 (Amiga, DOS) |

Award
| Publication | Award |
|---|---|
| Computer Gaming World | Strategy Game of the Year (1991) |

The game got 5 out of 5 stars in Dragon. Computer Gaming World in 1991 praised Powermonger as "simply superb ... a joy to play". Reviewing the Amiga version, CGW favorably cited its graphics and realism, but criticised its unusually strict copy protection and the need to load a saved game twice to return to the previous state. In a 1993 survey of strategy games set pre 20th-century, the magazine gave the game three stars out of five.

Reviewing the Sega CD version, GamePro criticised the graphics, particularly its pixelated maps that can make it difficult to see in-game, but they gave the game an overall recommendation based on its slow-paced strategy gameplay. Electronic Gaming Monthly gave Powermonger an overall score of 6.6 out of 10 from five reviewers, who praised the high detail of the simulation.

Powermonger won Computer Gaming World's 1991 Strategy Game of the Year award, and was ranked the 32nd best game of all time by Amiga Power.
