= Theme Park Inc =

2001 video game

Theme Park Inc.
- Microsoft Windows cover art for Theme Park Inc.
- Developers: Bullfrog Productions; Climax Group
- Publisher: EA Games
- Producer: Stuart Whyte
- Designer: Karl Fitzhugh
- Composer: James Hannigan
- Series: Theme Park
- Platform: Microsoft Windows
- Release: NA: January 30, 2001; EU: February 9, 2001
- Genre: Construction and management simulation
- Mode: Single-player

Theme Park Inc. (known as SimCoaster in the United States and Australia and Theme Park Manager in Germany) is a construction and management simulation video game. It is the final entry in Bullfrog Productions' Theme Park trilogy, following Theme Park (1994) and Theme Park World (1999).

Theme Park Inc. was published by Electronic Arts and was the last game to be developed by Bullfrog before the company's merger with EA UK in 2004.

== Gameplay ==
Gameplay screenshot of the player managing the "Arabian Nights" theme park

The player starts out as the assistant manager of a theme park, hired by the president of the company to take over his position. To do this, the player must build and manage a theme park with three unique zones: "Land of Invention", "Polar Zone", and "Arabian Nights". Each zone has unique rides, sideshows and scenery items. The player is guided by the president and his directors, each of whom specialize in a specific area of park management, and is aided by a blue spherical creature named the Advisor who gives the player advice. The player must hire staff to maintain the park, keep guests happy, and research new items for the player to build. Staff members must be kept well-rested and happy, or they may go on strike.

To advance further into the game, the player must complete several objectives. These objectives involve training staff for a specific job to unlock a new section of the park zone, or completing challenges to gain golden tickets, which are required to beat those objectives. Challenges include keeping guest happiness levels high, making sure a ride does not break down, or making a certain amount of profit from a specific ride. Completing these challenges will give a specified number of golden tickets, and certain challenges must be completed to complete an objective. However, if the player fails too many challenges, they will be fired and the game will be over. The objective of the game is to advance within the company by completing objectives and challenges, earning stock, unlocking new park areas, and gaining access to special rides through the use of golden tickets.

Theme Park Inc, in comparison to Theme Park World, has a greater emphasis on the management of the park rather than the rides themselves. The game requires more effort be put into finer aspects such as staff management, park layout, and guests' needs, as not doing so can make it more difficult to complete challenges and objectives. Theme Park Inc also introduced the Roller Coaster Editor, an in-built feature that allows players to create their own layouts for the pylon rides (roller coasters and log flumes) in the game. The players can then save these designs and use them in the game proper.

== Reception ==
Reception

Aggregate score
Aggregator	Score
Metacritic	75/100

Review scores
Publication	Score
AllGame	2.5/5
Computer Games Strategy Plus	3.5/5
Computer Gaming World	4/5
EP Daily	6.5/10
Game Informer	7.75/10
GameSpot	6.8/10
GameZone	8/10
IGN	8.5/10
Next Generation	4/5
PC Gamer (US)	75%
X-Play	4/5

The game received "generally favorable reviews" according to the review aggregation website Metacritic. Vincent Lopez of IGN said that the game has a visual charm that similar games, such as RollerCoaster Tycoon, lack. Lopez also said that the game was much improved from Theme Park World, in regards to the interface and advisor system. However, Ron Dulin of GameSpot criticized the game's complicated nature, and said that the goals interfere with its enjoyment. Eric Bratcher of NextGen said, "Like cotton candy dipped in chocolate and then sprinkled with peanuts, SimCoaster takes an established good thing and adds needed substance, though the ingredients don't blend perfectly."

The game sold 290,000 units in the U.S. and earned $5.8 million by August 2006, after its release in February 2001. It was the country's 68th best-selling computer game between January 2000 and August 2006. It also received a "Silver" sales award from the Entertainment and Leisure Software Publishers Association (ELSPA), indicating sales of at least 100,000 units in the UK.
