= Bullfrog Productions =

British video game developer

Bullfrog Productions Limited
- Logo used by Bullfrog throughout most of its lifetime, designed by Evie McLaughlin
- Type: Subsidiary
- Industry: Video games
- Predecessor: Taurus Impact Systems
- Founded: 1987; 39 years ago
- Founders: Peter Molyneux; Les Edgar
- Defunct: 2001
- Fate: Merged into EA UK
- Successors: See § Legacy
- Headquarters: Guildford, England
- Key people: Peter Molyneux; (managing director, 1987–1997); Les Edgar; (chairman, managing director, 1987–1999); Bruce McMillan; (managing director, 1999–2001)
- Products: Populous series; Syndicate series; Magic Carpet series; Theme series; Dungeon Keeper series
- Parent: Electronic Arts (1995–2001)

Bullfrog Productions Limited was a British video game developer based in Guildford, England. Founded in 1987 by Peter Molyneux and Les Edgar, the company gained recognition in 1989 for its third release, Populous, and is also well known for titles such as Theme Park, Theme Hospital, Magic Carpet, Syndicate and Dungeon Keeper. Bullfrog's name was derived from an ornament in the offices of Edgar's and Molyneux's other enterprise, Taurus Impact Systems, Bullfrog's precursor where Molyneux and Edgar were developing business software. Bullfrog Productions was founded as a separate entity after Commodore mistook Taurus for a similarly named company.

Electronic Arts, Bullfrog's publisher, acquired the studio in January 1995. Molyneux had become an Electronic Arts vice-president and consultant in 1994, after EA purchased a significant share of Bullfrog. Molyneux's last project with Bullfrog was Dungeon Keeper, and as a result of his dissatisfaction of the corporate aspects of his position, he left the company in July 1997 to found Lionhead Studios. Others would follow him to Lionhead, and some founded their own companies, such as Mucky Foot Productions. After Molyneux's departure, Electronic Arts' control over Bullfrog caused several projects to be cancelled. Bullfrog was merged into EA UK in 2001 and ceased to exist as a separate entity. Bullfrog titles have been looked upon as a standard for comparison and have spawned numerous spiritual sequels.

== History ==
=== Background, founding, and early years (1982–1989) ===
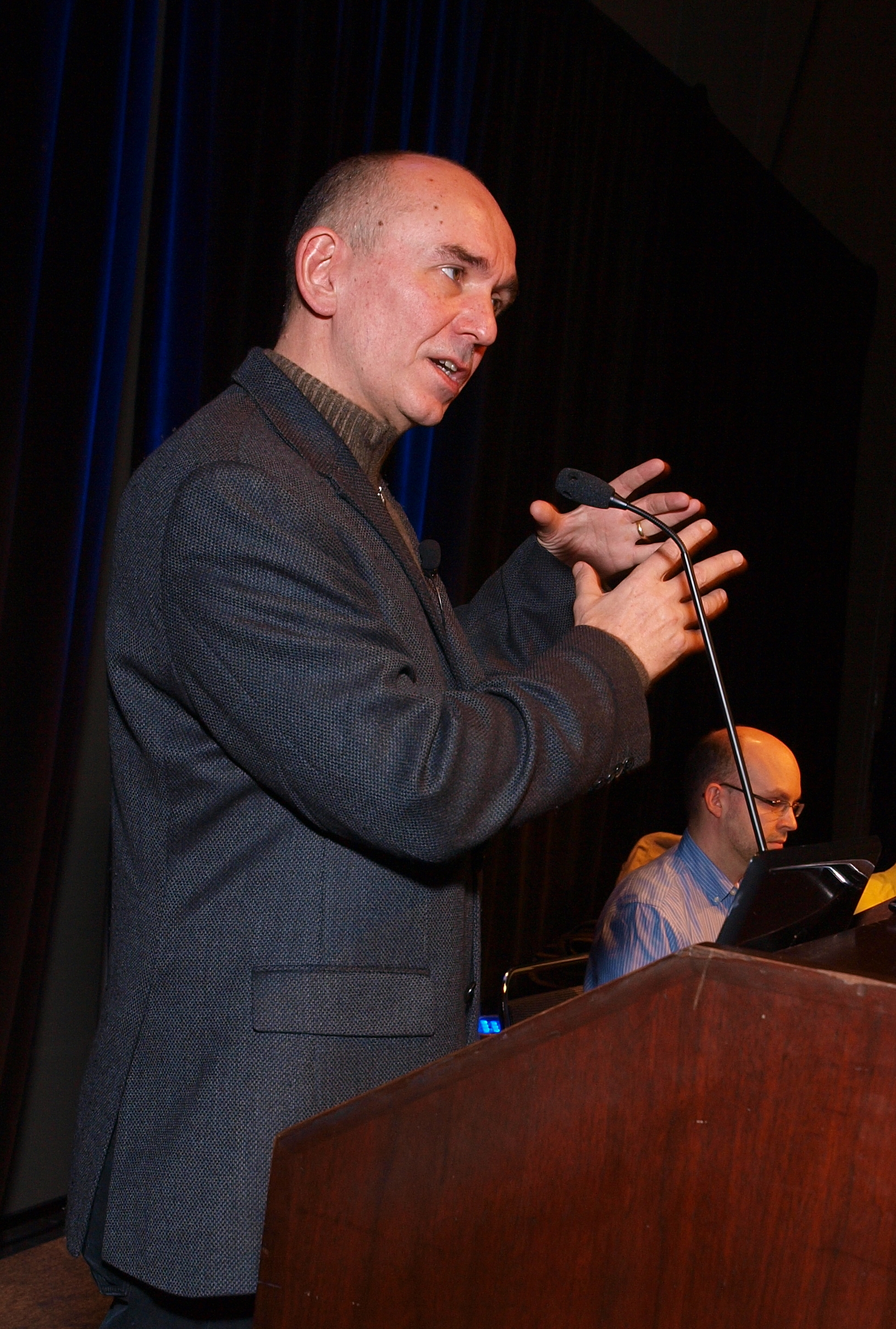
Peter Molyneux, co-founder of Bullfrog Productions, in 2010

In 1982, entrepreneur Peter Molyneux met Les Edgar at an audio electronics shop called PJ Hi-Fi. When Molyneux left the company where he was working, Edgar suggested that they start a new one, which would later develop business software for the Commodore 64 as Taurus Impact Systems (also known as Taurus Software). The new company was named after Molyneux and Edgar's shared astrological sign, the Taurus. At some point, Molyneux accepted a deal to export money systems to Switzerland and baked beans to the Middle East.

One day, Taurus received a call from the head of Commodore Europe, wanting to discuss the future of the Amiga and Taurus' software's suitability for the system. Molyneux was invited to Commodore Europe's headquarters, where he was offered several Amiga systems and a space at a show in Germany. When Molyneux was told that they were anticipating getting his network running on the Amiga, he realised that they had mistaken his company for one called Torus, a producer of networking systems. Molyneux wanted the Amiga systems, so he did not inform Commodore of this error. He received them and began writing a database program called Acquisition. Commodore kept asking about the database, and Molyneux gave them excuses because they were threatening to shut Taurus down. When Acquisition was finished, it was shown at the exhibition in Germany, and won product of the year. 2,000 copies were sold to a company in the United States, giving Molyneux and Edgar funds to sustain Taurus.

Another program Taurus wrote was a computer-aided design (CAD) package called X-CAD. They knew the Amiga was becoming a gaming machine, and a friend of Molyneux's asked him to convert Druid II: Enlightenment from the Commodore 64 to the Amiga. According to Edgar, it was around this time Bullfrog was founded in preparation for the day when Acquisition was no longer important and they could focus on games. Bullfrog was originally a brand of Taurus; Molyneux explained that this was because they wanted to avoid confusion over business software and money-making opportunities.

The name came from an ornament of a bullfrog located in the office: when asked by Joystick why the name "Bullfrog" was chosen, Molyneux stated that they wanted "an idiotic name" without having to find one, and there happened to be a sculpture of a colourful frog on a pedestal labelled "Bull Frog by Leonardo" on the table. Afterwards, Molyneux and Edgar were running out of money, and Edgar suggested they close the company down. It was at this point when Molyneux came up with the idea of Populous. The conversion of Druid II: Enlightenment, Populous, and a shoot 'em up game called Fusion were the first games developed under the Bullfrog brand.

=== Early success (1989–1995) ===
Populous was difficult to publish at first due to a lack of recognition—the god genre was, according to Bullfrog, "misunderstood by everyone". Despite this, Electronic Arts was willing to publish the game. Molyneux did not expect it to be successful, yet in 1989, the game received 10 awards, and another 12 the following year, with sales reaching one million copies. It ultimately sold four million copies. Edgar took note of the game's success and gave developers such as Imagineer licences to create ports for platforms such as the Super Nintendo Entertainment System (SNES) and Sega Mega Drive, which enabled the game to gain traction in Japan.

After Populous, Bullfrog moved into the Surrey Research Park in Guildford and had around 20 employees. Bullfrog was starting to gain a reputation, so people started to want to work for the company. Molyneux searched for staff himself, and employed artists and programmers. He travelled to universities, including Cambridge, where he offered computer scientists and banks the chance to come to the gaming industry.

Bullfrog's Powermonger was developed as a result of pressure from Electronic Arts for a follow-up to Populous. and was released in 1990. The game won multiple Best Strategy Game awards, including one from Computer Gaming World (as did Populous). The direct sequel to Populous, Populous II: Trials of the Olympian Gods, was released the following year and sold over a million copies. In late 1993, Bullfrog worked with researchers from the University of Surrey, who were nearby their offices, to study the movement and behaviour of underwater life so Bullfrog could reproduce it in the game Creation.

By the mid-1990s, Bullfrog had become well known for innovation and quality. A 1995 article in GamePro stated that "Bullfrog's work has been termed some of the most innovative by industry leaders, and it's pioneered different genres of software." The same year, Next Generation similarly asserted that "Bullfrog has earned a reputation as one of the most consistently innovative and imaginative development teams in the world." In July 1995, Edge stated that Bullfrog had "an unparalleled reputation for quality and innovation", and by that year, Bullfrog were "rightly considered one of the most innovative in the world", according to GamesTM.

In 1994, three games were in development: Creation, Theme Park, and Magic Carpet. Bullfrog focused on implementing multiplayer in all three games; Molyneux believed that multiplayer was more important than the compact disc (CD) format. Theme Park and Magic Carpet were released that year, the latter being the best-selling CD game that Christmas and winning Game of the Year awards in the United Kingdom and Germany. Theme Park proved popular in Japan and was a best-seller in Europe. During the development of Theme Park, artist Gary Carr left Bullfrog following a disagreement with Molyneux on the game: Molyneux wanted gaily coloured graphics that would appeal to the Japanese market, but Carr disapproved, believing it would not work. Carr joined The Bitmap Brothers, returning to Bullfrog in 1995 to work on Dungeon Keeper, although he ended up working as the lead artist on Theme Hospital instead.

In November 1994, Bullfrog began development for Dungeon Keeper. By then, the company had been approached many times to develop games around film licences. McDonald's approached Bullfrog at some point for a joint game venture. By mid-1995, Bullfrog was focused on artificial intelligence (AI) and had a dedicated AI team working at its offices. Two AI techniques, Personality Mapping and Skeletal Mapping, were developed.

=== Acquisition by Electronic Arts and Molyneux's departure (1995–1998) ===
According to Edgar, Bullfrog began merger talks with Electronic Arts in 1993. To get the best deal, he believed Bullfrog should also talk with other companies such as Sony and Virgin. He explained that Electronic Arts was the obvious choice as Bullfrog already had a positive relationship with them. According to Molyneux, Bullfrog received numerous offers expressing interest in purchasing the company. The offers were not taken seriously until major companies, such as Electronic Arts and Philips, made contact; it was then thought that the acquisition by one of these companies would be inevitable. Bullfrog was bought by Electronic Arts in early January 1995. The rumored price of the acquisition was $44 million(£29 million). By this time, the studio's staff count had risen from 35 to 60 and the acquisition allowed it to grow to 150 people within months. Molyneux became a vice-president of Electronic Arts and head of their European branch. Edgar became the vice-president of the European branch and Bullfrog's chairman. He described Bullfrog becoming part of a multinational company as "a very big change" and worked for Electronic Arts to assist with the transition. Although Molyneux had said that Bullfrog's products would not suffer as a result of Electronic Arts' purchase, the number of games in development meant that there was less time to refine them (despite the company's growth rate), affecting their quality.

After the release of Magic Carpet in 1994, seven games were in development: Magic Carpet 2, Theme Hospital, The Indestructibles, Syndicate Wars, Gene Wars, Creation, and Dungeon Keeper. After Electronic Arts' purchase, Molyneux was told to release a game, namely Magic Carpet 2 or Dungeon Keeper, within six weeks. Neither was near completion, so to appease Electronic Arts, Hi-Octane was created. It had a rushed development and no name by July 1995. Molyneux explained that Bullfrog's games were normally original, and it was not concerned about them being copied, but the project was "a little derivative", which was why it was kept secret—even Edgar was not informed of the project at first. Around this time, Bullfrog had a reputation for having largely ignored 16-bit game consoles, and Syndicate Wars was the company's first title originally developed for a console—the PlayStation.

As Molyneux had been made vice-president of Electronic Arts, his corporate role and responsibility increased considerably and he began making frequent trips to San Francisco. Over time, he grew increasingly frustrated with the position and wished to return to game development. In July 1996, Molyneux decided to resign from Bullfrog to focus on game design, rather than become a mere employee. In response, Electronic Arts banned him from its offices, forcing him to move development of Dungeon Keeper to his house. Molyneux speculated that this was because Electronic Arts feared that he would take people with him. He decided to leave as soon as Dungeon Keeper was finished and commented: "My last day will be the day that this game goes into final test. I'm very, very, very sad, but also very relieved." He also said that Electronic Arts had been "unbelievably patient" and thanked vice-president Mark Lewis for campaigning for Dungeon Keeper's completion. Molyneux's planned departure was his motivation to make Dungeon Keeper good. He believed that he would enjoy being an executive but said that it was "an utter nightmare". Shortly after his departure, Molyneux said he still had feelings for Bullfrog and wished them success. Despite his dissatisfaction with the corporate aspects of being vice-president, Molyneux said that he had learned "an enormous amount". In 2017, he revealed that his resignation was the consequence of his, and technical director Tim Rance's, drunkenness. He said he would take his resignation email back if he could.

Around this time, as Electronic Arts increased control over Bullfrog. Mark Healey (the lead artist for Dungeon Keeper) stated that the company "felt more like a chicken factory" after Electronic Arts' takeover and compared it to being assimilated by the Borg. Glenn Corpes (an artist for Fusion and Populous) stated that he was not surprised at Molyneux's departure. Another employee believed that working for Bullfrog had become "a job" and that the company had lost its innovation. In 2008, Electronic Arts' president John Riccitiello corroborated these sentiments by admitting that their "dictatorial managerial approach" had suppressed Bullfrog's creativity. Sean Cooper (the designer of Syndicate) said that if he could travel back in time, he would probably force Molyneux to refrain from selling Bullfrog to Electronic Arts. He described the period of resignations following Molyneux's departure as "such a horrible time". Molyneux believed that Electronic Arts had good intentions for Bullfrog, saying that "they just wanted to make it nicer" and putting the company's effects on Bullfrog down to "love abuse".

When Dungeon Keeper was nearing its completion in 1997, Molyneux, Rance, and Mark Webley (the project leader for Theme Hospital) founded a new company, Lionhead Studios, that July. By the time the studio's first game, Black & White, was released, Bullfrog employees such as Healey, Andy Bass (an artist who had worked on Theme Hospital), Russell Shaw (the composer for various titles), James Leach (Bullfrog's script writer), Paul McLaughlin (who worked on Creation), and Jonty Barnes (a programmer who had worked on Dungeon Keeper) had joined Lionhead. Healey stated that, because of his dissatisfaction at Bullfrog, he was happy to follow Molyneux and became Lionhead's first artist. Also in 1997, Mike Diskett (the project leader, lead programmer, and lead designer of Syndicate Wars), Finn McGechie (the lead artist for Magic Carpet), and Guy Simmons left to found Mucky Foot Productions, with Carr joining them the following year.

Other notable people at Bullfrog around the mid-1990s include Simon Carter (the lead programmer for Dungeon Keeper), Richard Reed (the project leader for Gene Wars), Mike Man (the lead artist for Syndicate Wars), Alan Wright (the project leader and lead programmer for Magic Carpet 2), and Eoin Rogan (the lead artist for Magic Carpet 2).

=== Post-Molyneux, final years, and closure (1998–2001) ===
In 1998, two games were released: Theme Aquarium, and Populous: The Beginning. Theme Aquarium was an attempt to "cross barriers" between the United Kingdom and Japan. Edgar explained that Bullfrog was more successful than most western game developers in Japan due to Populous and Theme Park, and wondered about the possibilities of having a game designed in the United Kingdom and implemented in Japan by Japanese development teams. A small group was set up to do this. Theme Aquarium was released as a Theme game in Japan only; western releases removed the Bullfrog branding. As of 2012, many ex-Bullfrog employees were unfamiliar with the game. Shortly before Molyneux's departure, Bullfrog announced that the games then in development may be the final ones released for MS-DOS. It was "quite likely" that all future games would be Windows-only. The reason for the change in platform focus was so Bullfrog could create games with Windows in mind and use "powerful features" (such as 3D acceleration), which were difficult to use with MS-DOS.

In 1999, Theme Park World and Dungeon Keeper 2 were released. Most of Theme Park World's development team came from Mindscape—they were brought to Bullfrog wholesale. Bullfrog worked with its sister company Maxis to release Theme Park World in North America under their Sim brand as Sim Theme Park to further establish itself in the region. Theme Resort, a Theme game based around holiday islands, was cancelled and its team reallocated to Theme Park World. Dungeon Keeper 2 had a new development team led by Nick Goldsworthy, previously an assistant producer for Theme Park at Electronic Arts. During the development, Colin Robinson was interviewed for the role of Bullfrog's chief technical officer, and helped the project succeed. In 2016, Glenn Corpes speculated that Electronic Arts did not understand Molyneux's role at Bullfrog and thought he was in charge of everything and that Electronic Arts' response to his departure would be to install managers. In fact, he focused on one game at a time, and let others carry out their work.

In mid-1999, Edgar stepped down as chairman. He was succeeded as managing director by Bruce McMillan of Electronic Arts' Canadian studios. Corpes left to found the studio Lost Toys with Jeremy Longley (who had worked on Theme Hospital, Syndicate Wars, and Populous III) and Darren Thomas (who had worked on Dungeon Keeper and Magic Carpet 2, and was the lead artist on Theme Park World), which Edgar supported financially. Corpes stated that he was inspired by Mucky Foot Productions running its own affairs and that it was "quite embarrassing to still be working for the Borg". He also said that Lost Toys was partially his take on what Bullfrog was. Alex Trowers (a designer who had worked on Syndicate and Powermonger) believed that Bullfrog had become too corporate after Electronic Arts' takeover and left for Lost Toys to return to "making games for the sake of making games", rather than to satisfy shareholders.

In August 1999, Electronic Arts appointed Ernest Adams as the lead designer of the fourth instalment in the Populous series, Genesis: The Hand of God. Bullfrog's management had concerns about its similarity to Lionhead Studios' Black & White and cancelled the project. Adams then became the lead designer on Dungeon Keeper 3. As Dungeon Keeper 2 did not perform as well as hoped, the team were instructed to make the third game more accessible. Development began in November 1999, but Electronic Arts' focus was changing. It was in negotiation with J. K. Rowling and New Line Cinema for licences to Harry Potter and The Lord of the Rings, respectively. Electronic Arts saw a profitable opportunity and, in March 2000, cancelled Dungeon Keeper 3 in favour of those franchises, although its cancellation was not officially announced until August. Bullfrog moved to Chertsey in 2000 and went through "a quiet patch" for the remainder of the year.

The final game under the Bullfrog brand, Theme Park Inc, was released in 2001. By the time the game was in development, most of the Bullfrog teams had become part of EA UK and much of the development was handled by another company. What remained of Bullfrog was then merged into EA UK. Molyneux stayed with Lionhead Studios until the formation of 22cans in 2012. Edgar had some involvement with the gaming industry since Bullfrog but eventually left for the automotive industry. In August 2009, Electronics Arts were considering reviving some of Bullfrog's games for then current systems.

== Legacy ==
Several employees founded their own companies after leaving Bullfrog. These include:

- Lionhead Studios – Founded by Peter Molyneux, Mark Webley, and Tim Rance (as well as Steve Jackson, the co-founder of Games Workshop and co-author of the Fighting Fantasy books), Lionhead is best known for their Black & White and Fable series. The company was acquired by Microsoft and closed down on 29 April 2016.
- Mucky Foot Productions – Founded by Mike Diskett, Fin McGechie, and Guy Simmons. Gary Carr joined shortly afterwards. A deal with Eidos Interactive was signed and Mucky Foot Productions developed three games: Urban Chaos, Startopia, and Blade II. The company closed in 2003.
- Lost Toys – Founded by Glenn Corpes, Jeremy Longley, and Darran Thomas. The studio created two games—Ball Breakers/Moho and Battle Engine Aquila—before shutting down.
- Media Molecule – Best known for LittleBigPlanet, Media Molecule was established by Mark Healey, Alex Evans, Dave Smith, and Kareem Ettouney.
- Intrepid Computer Entertainment – This company was started by Joe Rider and Matt Chilton, and signed by Microsoft as a first-party developer. Intrepid closed in 2004, and its employees moved to Lionhead Studios.
- Big Blue Box Studios – Founded by Bullfrog programmers Simon and Dene Carter, and Ian Lovett (who worked on Magic Carpet and Dungeon Keeper), Big Blue Box Studios were "very close" to Lionhead Studios, and the two companies merged.
- 22cans – Founded in 2012 by Molyneux after he left Lionhead. 22cans is known for Godus, which took inspiration from Populous and Dungeon Keeper, as well as Lionhead's Black & White.
- Two Point Studios – Founded in 2016 by Gary Carr and Mark Webley, Two Point Studios signed a publishing deal with Sega in May 2017.
- Elixir Studios – Founded in 1998 by Demis Hassabis, Elixir Studios is best known for Republic: The Revolution and Evil Genius. Demis Hassabis would later move onto found the company DeepMind in 2010, and win the Nobel Prize in Chemistry in 2024.

Several Bullfrog games have spawned spiritual successors or have been used as a base for comparison. Dungeon Keeper has influenced War for the Overworld and Mucky Foot's Startopia, the former being described as "a true spiritual successor to Dungeon Keeper". DR Studios' Hospital Tycoon has been compared to Theme Hospital. Satellite Reign (programmed by Mike Diskett) has been labelled a spiritual successor to the Syndicate series. Two Point Hospital, developed by Two Point Studios, is considered to be a spiritual successor to Theme Hospital. In October 2013, Jeff Skalski of Mythic Entertainment, which produced a free-to-play remake of Dungeon Keeper for mobile platforms, said he would like to remake other Bullfrog titles, and described the company as "unstoppable". Theme Park also received a freemium remake in December 2011.

== Games developed ==
=== Cancelled projects ===
Bullfrog cancelled several projects. According to Molyneux, the most common reason games were abandoned in the company's earlier days was because the game testers did not like them. That being the case, his theory was that customers would not either. Cancelled games include:

- Ember – Players would have piloted a speeder craft to repair a microprocessor chip, competing against a rival trying to undo the player's repairs.
- Colony – An arcade-adventure-puzzle game in which players would have attempted to save the passengers and crew of a cryogenic ship by repairing the cryogenic suspension system, using video cameras to monitor activity on the ship.
- Hell – A scrolling shoot 'em up based in the underworld and based on Joust.
- The Indestructibles – Described as "an action-beat-'em-up-strategy-everything game", The Indestructibles would have involved creating superhumans to defend cities from invaders.
- Creation – Set in the same reality as Syndicate, Creation would have had the player battling to transform an alien water world.
- Void Star – This was to be a 3D real-time strategy game set in space, but was cancelled it was believed that there would be no interest in the concept.
- Theme Resort, Theme Prison, Theme Ski Resort, and Theme Airport – These were "talked about" after the release of Theme Hospital but never materialised due to Mark Webley and Gary Carr leaving for other companies. Theme Resort was in development (according to Webley, its team were trying to have a trip to Club Med for research), and its team joined Theme Park World after cancellation. Webley stated that Bullfrog intended to explore other possibilities for its Designer Series (of which Theme Park and Theme Hospital are part of), but Electronic Arts had it shut down.
- Genesis: The Hand of God – Intended to be the next instalment in the Populous series but was cancelled due to similarities to Lionhead's Black & White.
- Dungeon Keeper 3 – Project was cancelled in favour of film franchises such as Harry Potter and The Lord of the Rings. Bullfrog also decided to cease developing real-time strategy games.
- Theme Movie Studio – Did not make it past the concept stage.
