= Urban Chaos =

1999 video game

- North American PlayStation cover art
- Developer: Mucky Foot Productions
- Publisher: Eidos Interactive
- Platforms: Microsoft Windows, PlayStation, Dreamcast
- Release: Windows; December 10, 1999; PlayStation: NA: March 31, 2000; EU: April 15, 2000; Dreamcast: EU: October 6, 2000; NA: November 13, 2000
- Genre: Action-adventure
- Mode: Single-player

Urban Chaos is the debut video game of English developer Mucky Foot Productions with its initial release in 1999 on Microsoft Windows. It was subsequently released on the PlayStation and Dreamcast. The game was published by Eidos Interactive.

In May 2017, Mucky Foot's Mike Diskett released the source code of the game under the MIT license on GitHub.

== Gameplay ==
The game is an action-adventure game from a third-person perspective. It is set in largely free-roaming maps. It also utilized a rather complex fighting system incorporating kicks, punches, throws and sliding tackles as well as two melee weapons; knives and baseball bats. However, the player can also arrest enemies, which will make the populace more friendly towards them. Later on, an additional character is gained who is less agile, due to his age, but whose attacks do more damage. A Jamaican gang banger is also available in bonus missions.

The city maps, although small, do include indoor areas, people to talk to, fights to intervene in and even additional missions and completely different ways to achieve the player's goals that include assaults, hostage rescues, and stopping someone from committing suicide. There are 24 main levels, four bonus levels and a separate demo level which is not included in the full version of game.

== Plot ==
The story begins with D'arci Stern, the protagonist, joining the Union City Police Department. Much of her time is spent dealing with the Wildcats, a gang that is getting increasingly bold in their criminal activity. With the help of a vigilante named Roper McIntyre, D'arci begins to believe that the Wildcats plan to take over Union City. As the Wildcats grow ever bolder, D'arci discovers that the gang is led by Mack Bane, a candidate for mayor of Union City. Eventually, the Wildcats attempt a hostile takeover of the city, which is finally repelled by D'arci, Roper and the police.

Some time later, D'arci is investigating a particularly brutal murder. She discovers that the murder was committed by Bane's elite bodyguards, a brotherhood of mysterious men in tailored black suits known as "The Fallen". This establishes a connection between Bane, the Wildcats and the Fallen. Soon after, he is arrested by D'arci and Roper in his out-of-town estate. Even from jail, Bane is able to direct the Wildcats, and D'arci and Roper are forced to deal with several more threats to the city. Later, Bane breaks out of jail and claims to be an Ancient Warlock. He uses his powers to summon a fire beast known as a Baalrog, which attempts to destroy the city, but D'arci and Roper defeat it. Bane and the Wildcats flee to a sanctuary tower to fulfill a prophecy; before they can complete their ritual, D'arci and Roper must rescue injured civilians, battle the remnants of the Wildcats and Fallen, and use the tower's ventilation system to destroy Bane once and for all.

== Reception ==
Reception

Aggregate scores
Aggregator	Score		
Aggregator	Dreamcast	PC	PS
GameRankings	48%	76%	51%
Metacritic	52/100	N/A	N/A

Review scores
Publication	Score		
Publication	Dreamcast	PC	PS
CNET Gamecenter	N/A	6/10	N/A
Computer Gaming World	N/A	3.5/5	N/A
Electronic Gaming Monthly	N/A	N/A	5.33/10 (Note: In Electronic Gaming Monthly's review of the PlayStation version, one critic gave it 6/10, and the rest gave it each a score of 5/10.)
EP Daily	N/A	9/10	4.5/10
Eurogamer	N/A	9/10	8/10
Game Informer	N/A	N/A	2.75/10
GameRevolution	N/A	B−	C
GameSpot	2.4/10	8.3/10	2.9/10
GameSpy	N/A	61%	N/A
IGN	6.8/10	8.7/10	4.5/10
Next Generation	N/A	3/5	N/A
Official U.S. PlayStation Magazine	N/A	N/A	2/5
PC Accelerator	N/A	8/10	N/A
PC Gamer (US)	N/A	58%	N/A
The Cincinnati Enquirer	N/A	4/4	N/A
The Sydney Morning Herald	N/A	3/5	N/A

The game was met with positive reviews when it was released on PC, but console ports were met with mixed to negative reception, according to GameRankings. The Dreamcast version received "mixed or average" reviews according to the review aggregation website Metacritic. Computer Games Strategy Plus gave the PC version a score of four stars out of five and called it "a game screaming to become a comic book. The graphics are excellent and the storyline will have you wanting to turn to the last page just to see who, or what, is responsible. Muckey Foot has definitely brought the fun back to vigilante justice." Bernard Dy of GamePro called it "a wild jaunt through an alternate millennium. Don't be misled by the cartoonish art or simple controls into thinking this is a lesser product. Quit waiting for the Tomb Raider series to do something different: Urban Chaos is a fix you can get right now." (Note: GamePro gave the PC version 3.5/5 for graphics, and three 4/5 scores for sound, control, and fun factor.) GameZone gave it 7.4 out of 10, saying, "This is a lot of fun, and in spite of the amount of hard drive space it consumes, it is well crafted." Edge gave it seven out of ten and called it "a 'nearly there' title, a game whose patent quality will have you wondering 'What if?' time and again." Jim Preston of NextGen called it "a fun no-brainer."

Rich Briggs of AllGame gave the PlayStation version two-and-a-half stars out of five, calling it "a terrible shame. There are so many excellent concepts at work, and the game possesses such depth, that it should be a pleasure to play. Unfortunately, the combat, control and camera problems will keep most players from ever experiencing its true charm." However, Jon Thompson gave the Dreamcast version two stars out of five, saying that it "seeks to bring large brawls to life, with enemies attacking from all sides, but dealing with multiple baddies soon becomes a tremendous pain, as they attack quickly and the loose controls do not allow you to respond in time. If you don't die getting to the criminals, you'll often find yourself losing your life once you get there."

The game's console port was a runner-up for the "Worst Game" award at GameSpot's Best and Worst of 2000 Awards, which went to Spirit of Speed 1937. The staff dubbed it "an uncontrollable, choppy mess."
