= Mucky Foot Productions =

British video game developer

Mucky Foot Productions Limited
- Type: Private
- Industry: Video games
- Predecessor: Bullfrog Productions
- Founded: January 1997
- Defunct: November 2003
- Fate: Liquidation
- Headquarters: Guildford, England
- Key people: Mike Diskett; Fin McGechie; Guy Simmons; Gary Carr
- Products: Urban Chaos; Startopia

Mucky Foot Productions Limited was a British video game developer active from 1997 to 2003.

== History ==
The company was founded in 1997 in Guildford, England by three ex-Bullfrog developers: Mike Diskett, Fin McGechie and Guy Simmons. They intended to avoid the expansion and corporate atmosphere that had taken over at Bullfrog. Another ex-Bullfrog stalwart, Gary Carr, joined as the fourth director shortly afterward.

A worldwide publishing deal with the UK publisher Eidos was announced in October 1997. That announcement was also used to announce Mucky Foot's first game Urban Chaos. At this point, the game was referred to by its earlier work in progress name of Dark City.

Over its lifetime, Mucky Foot went on to release two more titles: Startopia and Blade II.

Despite high initial expectations, the company closed its doors in November 2003 due to a decline in both business and financial stability. This company closure saw six further games cease development while still only part produced like Bulletproof Monk, The Punisher, and Urban Chaos 2.

In May 2017, Mucky Foot's Mike Diskett released the source code of Urban Chaos under the MIT license on GitHub.

== Games ==
Release date	Titles	Platform(s)
1999	Urban Chaos	Windows, PlayStation, Dreamcast
2001	Startopia	Windows
2002	Blade II	PlayStation 2, Xbox
Canceled	Bulletproof Monk	PlayStation 2, Xbox, Windows
Canceled	The Punisher	PlayStation 2, Xbox, Windows
Canceled	Urban Chaos 2	PlayStation 2, Xbox, Windows
Canceled	ER Tycoon	Windows
Canceled	Skyships	Unknown
Canceled	Barbarian	Unknown
