= Theme Park (video game) =

1994 video game

- European cover art
- Developers: Bullfrog Productions; Krisalis Software (PlayStation, Saturn); EA Japan (Nintendo DS)
- Publishers: Bullfrog Productions; Electronic Arts; Mindscape (CD32); Ocean Software (Jaguar, PAL SNES); Domark (Mega-CD)
- Programmers: Peter Molyneux; Demis Hassabis
- Composer: Russell Shaw
- Platforms: 3DO, Amiga, CD32, Classic Mac OS, FM Towns, Genesis/Mega Drive, Jaguar, Mega CD, MS-DOS, PlayStation, PC-98, PC-88, Saturn, Super NES, X68000, Nintendo DS, iOS, Windows
- Release: June 1994: MS-DOS; EU: 1994; NA: 1994 Amiga; EU: 1994 3DO; NA: 1994; EU: 1994 Mega Drive/Genesis; EU: May 21, 1995; NA: 1995 Sega CD, CD32; EU: 1995 Mac; NA: 1995 Jaguar; NA: March 1995 FM Towns; JP: 22 September 1995 Saturn; EU: November 1995; JP: 22 December 1995; NA: 1995; WW: 11 April 1997 PlayStation; EU: 30 October 1995; JP: 29 December 1995; NA: 1996; WW: 11 April 1997 SNES; JP: 15 December 1995; EU: 11 November 1996 Nintendo DS; JP: 15 March 2007; NA: 20 March 2007; AU: 22 March 2007; EU: 23 March 2007 iOS; NA: 8 December 2011
- Genre: Construction and management sim
- Mode: Single-player

Theme Park is a construction and management simulation video game developed by Bullfrog Productions and published by Electronic Arts in 1994. The game is the first installment in Bullfrog's Theme series and their Designer Series. The player designs and operates an amusement park, with the goal of making money and creating theme parks worldwide. Development took about a year and a half, with the team aiming for as much realism as possible. Certain features, including multiplayer, were dropped.

The game was released in June 1994 on numerous computer systems. Theme Park received generally positive reviews and has been listed among the greatest video games ever made. Critics praised its gameplay and humor, with minor criticism directed at the console ports' lack of save and mouse support. In addition to the game selling 15 million units, it received several rereleases; The game received a Japanese localisation (in addition to normal Japanese releases), Shin Theme Park, released in 1997 for the Saturn and PlayStation, and remakes for the Nintendo DS (2007) and iOS (2011). Theme Hospital is Bullfrog's thematic successor to the game, and two direct sequels followed: Theme Park World (1999) and Theme Park Inc (2001).

== Gameplay ==
A typical Theme Park

Starting with a free plot of land in the United Kingdom and a few hundred thousand pounds, the player must build a profitable amusement park. Money is spent on building rides, shops, and staff, and earned through sale of entry tickets, merchandise, and refreshments. Shops available include those selling foodstuff (such as ice creams) or soft drinks, and games such as coconut shies and arcades. Their attributes can be customised, which may affect customers' behaviour: for example, affecting the flavour of foods (e.g. by altering the amount of sugar an ice cream contains) may entice customers to return. Facilities such as toilets, and items that enhance the park's scenery (such as trees and fountains) can be purchased. Over thirty attractions, ranging in complexity from the bouncy castle and tree house to more complicated and expensive rides such as the roller coaster and Ferris wheel are available. Also available are shows (called 'acts') with themes such as clowns and mediaeval. Certain rides, such as roller coasters, require a track to be laid out. The ride complement varies between platforms: for example, the PlayStation version is missing the mediaeval and dolphin shows. Rides require regular maintenance: if neglected for too long they will explode. Depending on the platform, it is possible to tour the park or the rides.

Visitors arrive and leave via a bus. The entry price can be set, and loans can be taken out. The player starts with a limited number of shops, rides, and facilities available. Research must be carried out to purchase others. Research can also make rides more durable, staff more efficient, and buses larger with increased capacity. The topic of research and how much funding goes into it is determined by the player.

Staff available for employment include entertainers, security guards, mechanics, and handymen. Lack of staff can cause problems, including messy footpaths, rides breaking down, crime, and unhappy visitors. If visitors become unhappy, thugs may come to vandalise the park by committing offences such as popping balloons, stealing food, and beating up entertainers. Occasionally, wages and the price of goods must be negotiated; failure to reach an agreement results in staff strikes or loss of shipment.

Theme Park offers three levels of simulation: the higher difficulties requiring more management of aspects such as logistics. For example, at full level, the player must manage research, negotiations, stocks, and shares. On sandbox, the game does not involve those aspects. The player can switch mode at any time. Game time is implemented like a calendar: at the end of each year, the player is judged on that year's performance against rivals. Game speed can be adjusted, and staff can be moved by the player. Cash awards may be earned for doing well, and trophies may be awarded for achievements such as having the longest roller coaster.

The goal is to increase the park's value and available money so that it can be sold and a new lot purchased from another part of the world to start a new theme park. Once enough money has been made, the player can auction the park and move on to newer plots, located worldwide and having different factors affecting gameplay, including the economy, weather, terrain, and land value. The Mega Drive and SNES versions feature different settings (e.g. desert and glacier) depending on the park's location.

== Development ==
Peter Molyneux stated that he came up with the idea of creating Theme Park because he felt the business genre was worth pursuing. He said that Theme Park is a game he had always wanted to create, and wanted to avoid the mistakes of his earlier business simulation game, The Entrepreneur: He wanted to create a business simulation game and make it fun so that people would want to play it. In an interview, he explained that the primary reason he created Theme Park was because he wanted players to create their dream Theme Park. Another reason is he wanted players to understand the kind of work running one entails. The three difficulty settings enable players to choose the desired depth: simply having fun creating a theme park, or making all the business decisions too. Molyneux stated that the most difficult part to program was the visitors' behaviour.

The story was originally to have the player play the role of a nephew who had inherited a fortune from his aunt, to be spent only on the world's largest and most profitable theme park. The graphics were drawn and modelled using 3D Studio. Molyneux stated that each person takes about 200 bytes of memory, enough for them to have their own personality. The team travelled the world visiting theme parks and taking notes, and sound effects were sampled from real parks. Molyneux explained that they were going for as much realism as possible. There was to be a feature where a microphone is placed on a visitor, so the player could hear what they were saying, and multiplayer support was dropped two weeks prior to release because of a deadline. Multiplayer mode would have let players send thugs to other parks.

Theme Park took roughly a year and a half for Molyneux and co-designer and chief programmer Demis Hassabis to develop. Much of the code was used in Theme Hospital, and an animation editor was improved by Theme Hospital's designer and producer Mark Webley, who dubbed it The Complex Engine. Artist Gary Carr did not think the game was a good idea, and disliked the art style. Molyneux wanted him to create a colourful style to appeal to a Japanese market, but Carr disagreed and left Bullfrog. Carr later retracted his beliefs and, in 2012, stated that he considered the game a classic. In 1994, Molyneux was developing both Theme Park and Magic Carpet. The game was mostly complete by January 1994 and scheduled for release on 28 March, but this was pushed back to June, and then August. Theme Park sold over 15 million copies, and was extremely popular in Japan (the Japanese PlayStation version sold 85 thousand copies within weeks), as well as Europe. Theme Park did not sell well in the United States; Molyneux hypothesised that this was because the graphics are too childish for American audiences. The game is the first instalment in Bullfrog's Designer Series, and it was intended for the series to use Theme Park's engine and for each instalment to have three simulation levels. The PC version was sponsored by Midland Bank.

The PlayStation port was developed by Krisalis Software, and released in 1995. The Mega CD port features CD soundtrack, and was developed by Domark and released in the same year. Bullfrog developed the Mega Drive port, which was released on May 21, 1995, and the Sega Saturn port, released in November 1995. Other ports include the Amiga CD32, Atari Jaguar, 3DO Interactive Multiplayer, Super Nintendo Entertainment System, and Macintosh. Mark Healey handled the graphics for the Mega Drive and Super Nintendo Entertainment System versions. The graphics were completed in three days. The PC version was released on GOG.com on 9 December 2013.

== Reception ==
Reception

Review scores
Publication	Score
Computer and Video Games	92% (PC)
Edge	8/10 (PC)
Electronic Gaming Monthly	6.5/10 (JAG); 8/10 (SAT)
Hyper	87% (SMD)
Jeuxvideo.com	17/20 (PC); 17/20 (Macintosh)
Joystick	85% (PC)
Mean Machines Sega	93% (Mega Drive); 90% (SAT)
Mega Fun	85% (SNES); 75% (JAG)
Next Generation	2/5 (JAG and 3DO); 3/5 (SAT); 3/5 (Macintosh)
PC Gamer (UK)	95% (PC)
Atari Inside	85% (JAG)
CU Amiga	93% (Amiga)
Maximum	3/5 (PS1)
Sega Saturn Magazine (UK)	90% (SAT)
ST Computer	82% (JAG)
Sega Saturn Magazine (Japan)	7.66/10 (SAT)

Theme Park received critical acclaim. The gameplay, graphics, and addictiveness in particular were well received. A reviewer of Edge commented that the game is complex, but praised the detail and addictiveness. PC Gamer's Gary Whitta was highly impressed with the game: he eulogised the fun factor and compared it to that of SimCity 2000. He also praised the "gloriously cartoony" graphics and "exceptional" soundtrack. Theme Park was named as the PC Gamer June 1994 Game of The Month. Computer and Video Games's reviewer complimented the "cute" graphics, and described the game as "fun" and "feature-packed". The visitors' and ride animations were complimented by French magazine Joystick.

The Jaguar version was noted by critics as having problems such as slowdown and lack of a save option, although some liked the graphics and gameplay. The four reviewers of Electronic Gaming Monthly commented that the game itself is great fun, but that the Jaguar conversion had confusing menus and dithered text which is excessively difficult to read. GamePro echoed these criticisms and further stated that the Jaguar version suffers from frustrating slowdown. They summarised that "Ocean didn't work hard enough to make Theme Park look and sound good on the Jaguar". A reviewer for Next Generation took the reverse position, saying that the Jaguar conversion "is seamless" and the game itself was mediocre. Their elaboration was that "slow gameplay and confusing layouts keep it from ever achieving the addictiveness of the other 'god' games, and most players will find themselves bored before they've even run through all of the options". German magazine Atari Inside's reviewer complimented the addictiveness, but the lack of save opportunities was criticised, and a reviewer from ST Computer believed the game's complexity and colourful graphics assured it of being long and attractive. Mega Fun's main criticism of the Jaguar version was its inability to save in-game.

The Saturn version was noted as being mostly faithful to the PC original. Sam Hickman of Sega Saturn Magazine praised it for retaining the original intro, music, speech samples, and features of the PC version (all of which had been left out of most previous console versions), although a reviewer from the Japanese magazine of the same name criticised the lack of mouse support. Electronic Gaming Monthly's reviewer held a similar opinion to that of Hickman by commending the Saturn version for being a comprehensive port of the PC original, and also applauded the addictive simulation gaming of Theme Park, calling it "SimCity with a playful spirit". Mean Machines Sega's reviewer compared it to the Mega Drive version, citing the save function and variety of entertainers as major improvements over that version. A Next Generation critic lauded the game's "simple interface", "infectious gameplay", and "realistic business fundamentals", but felt the Saturn's "near-perfect" conversion of the PC original was commendable but unexciting, and expressed regret that there were no upgrades or additions. GamePro gave a terse joint review of the Saturn and PlayStation versions, commenting: "You decide every detail, right down to the roller coaster's speed. Simple graphics and sounds offer up little treats to keep the game interesting. Overlapping menu systems force you to read the manual".

Critics had similar opinions of other versions. Mean Machines Sega described the game as "the most complex Megadrive game ever created", and eulogised playability and longevity, but criticised the behaviour of the handymen. CU Amiga praised the addictiveness of the Amiga version, and called the game "colourful". The visuals were likewise commended by Jeuxvideo.com on the PC and Macintosh versions, and the British humour was complimented as well. German magazine Mega Fun compared the SNES version to the Mega Drive version, and said the SNES version had better controls and music, creating atmosphere. Reviewing the PlayStation version, Maximum said that the game "is probably one of the best sim games around. It manages to strike a balance between in-depth game play and personality, which you don't get with the more brow-furrowing games of this genre", although the only improvement being a view option was cited as a disappointment. Next Generation reviewed the 3DO version of the game, and stated that "it's cute, but we're waiting for 3DO's Transport Tycoon". In their review of the Macintosh version of the game, they believed that players would think of it when they visit Disneyland.

=== Accolades ===
In 1997, Theme Park appeared jointly with Theme Hospital at No. 61 on PC Gamer's list of top 100 games. In 2004, Theme Park was inducted into GameSpot's list of the greatest games of all time. In 1995, Total! ranked the game 36th on their Top 100 SNES Games. In 1996, GamesMaster rated the Sega Saturn version 6th in its "The GamesMaster Saturn Top 10."

== Re-releases ==
Shin Theme Park. The visuals are redone to appeal to a Japanese audience.

A Japanese remake of Theme Park, titled Shin Theme Park (新テーマパーク, Shin Tēma Pāku; lit. New Theme Park) was released on 11 April 1997 by Electronic Arts Victor for the Sony PlayStation and Sega Saturn. This version is different from other releases in Japan; the game's style and visuals are changed. The game was remade for the Nintendo DS by EA Japan. It was released in Japan on 15 March 2007 with releases in the US and Europe on 20 and 23 March, respectively. New features of the game are the user interface, which was designed to fit the stylus functionality of the DS platform, and bonus rides/shops exclusive to certain properties, such as a tea room themed on an AEC Routemaster bus for England, Japanese dojo-style bouncy castle for Japan, a Coliseum-themed pizza parlour for Italy, a La Sagrada Familia-themed paella restaurant for Spain etc. The remake is based on the MS-DOS version. The game differs from the original in that the game provides four different advisers. Theme Park was remade for iOS in 2011. Items can only be placed on designated places, and the game relies on premium items. Rides can cost up to $60 (£46) in real money, and for this reason the game was not well received.

== See also ==
- Parkitect – 2018 video game
- Planet Coaster – 2016 video game by Frontier Developments
- RollerCoaster Tycoon – Video game series
