= Glenn Corpes =

Video game developer

- Occupation: Video game developer
- Known for: Populous; Magic Carpet; Dungeon Keeper; Battle Engine Aquila
- Notable work: Populous

Glenn Corpes is an independent video game developer. He is best known for his work at Bullfrog Productions on titles including Populous (of which he was a co-creator), Magic Carpet, and Dungeon Keeper. He left Bullfrog in 1999 to form Lost Toys, which developed two games including Battle Engine Aquila. He has since focused on mobile game development and has created Ground Effect for iOS and Topia World Builder for iOS and Android. His latest projects are Fat Owl With A JetPack, and powARdup. His work has influenced games such as Minecraft.

== Career ==
Prior to joining Bullfrog, Corpes had been a computer operator, and then a Telex machine OS programmer. He joined Bullfrog after being made redundant from the Telex job, as chief graphics artist. He was a co-designer of Populous, and also designed its graphics. Corpes also created the 3D landscape, which Peter Molyneux and Les Edgar were intrigued by. He also wrote functions enabling CGA, EGA, and VGA support, and programmed the Atari ST version.

In 1991, Corpes came up with the idea for Magic Carpet, and created its circular map. He also refined its engine many times, and developed editors and landscape generators to facilitate its use. Corpes wrote the engine of Dungeon Keeper (which was taken from Magic Carpet), which became an inspiration for Minecraft. Corpes has held various positions at Bullfrog, including head of technology, and head of research and development.

In 1999, Corpes left Bullfrog and founded Lost Toys with Jeremy Longley and Darren Thomas. The company developed two titles: Moho (also known as Ball Breaker) and Battle Engine Aquila before closing in October 2003. Lost Toys had been developing a third title, Stunt Car Racer Pro. Corpes stated that Battle Engine Aquila is "the best thing I ever worked on". Corpes afterwards formed Weirdwood, which focused on online-distributed games. At some point, he worked for Kuju Entertainment and Electronic Arts. He also worked with 22cans for a year and did "a bit of work" on Curiosity – What's Inside the Cube?. In May 2001, Edge described Corpes as "one of the most gifted coders working in the game industry".

Corpes developed Ground Effect, a racing game featuring "ground effect vehicles (a cross between hovercraft and aeroplanes) released for iOS in 2009. He collaborated with Crescent Moon to develop Topia World Builder, a world simulation game. It was released on iOS in October 2012, and its also available on Android. Corpes is developing Fat Owl With A Jetpack, a "Lunar Lander-style game" for iOS. Corpes has said "it's taken way too long!". Corpes self-published powARdup, developed with his son, Jack Corpes and released in October 2017. It is an augmented reality "futuristic collect-and-avoid arcade game". Corpes has been working on the team of 3D design software Vector Suite since 2019 heading up R&D activities for surface generation technology for both AR/VR and non-VR creation.
