= Russell Shaw (composer) =

British composer and sound designer

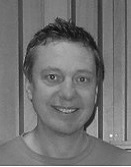
- Born: 1962 (age 63–64); United Kingdom
- Occupations: Composer and sound designer
- Known for: Syndicate; Dungeon Keeper; Populous; Black & White; Theme Park; Fable series

Russell Shaw is a BAFTA-nominated British composer and sound designer. He is known for his work in many video games, particularly those designed by Peter Molyneux.

== Biography and career ==
Shaw was exposed to music at the age of five, when he was given a guitar by his uncle. He trained himself in music playing in various bands through late 1970s to early 1980s. Although he had an interest in playing music, he wanted to be a record producer. After training at SAE London in the mid-1980s, he was hired by Gerry Anderson (of Thunderbirds fame) as his recording studio manager, recording sound for various television shows. including Terrahawks, Dick Spanner and Space Precinct.

Around 1990, Shaw left Anderson and returned to music production, working for StreetSounds record label, providing releases for the London white label dance club scene. He also stated that he was "an avid gamer" at that time, owning an Atari ST, which he also used for processing and sequencing music.

In 1992, he learned that Peter Molyneux's Bullfrog Productions needed a sound specialist for audio in their games, and Shaw decided to try as he was experienced in both computer technology and sound, successfully getting the job. At Bullfrog, Shaw composed soundtracks for many of their games, but most memorable and successful were for strategy games Syndicate, Theme Park, Magic Carpet' and Dungeon Keeper. In 1997, Bullfrog's founder Peter Molyneux quit the company and formed Lionhead Studios, and Shaw followed him in the new venture.

His first project with the new game studio was the soundtrack for Black & White. A fan of ambient techno, Shaw composed an interactive, meditative and relaxing soundtrack in the manner of the genre. The music was positively received by sites such as IGN and GameSpot. Black & White was followed by 2004's Fable. Danny Elfman was brought in to compose the theme music, and Shaw was asked to do more traditional orchestral ingame score that would more fit Elfman's dark fairytale-styled theme music. Hollywood conductor Allan Wilson (who worked with Elfman on his music for 1999 film Sleepy Hollow) was brought in to conduct the Philharmonia Orchestra, and Shaw used The Pinewood Singers to further enhance the dark fantasy nature of the score.

Shaw not only composed the game score, but also coded the audio tools and libraries and implemented the sound into the game himself. The Fable soundtrack was successful, with IGN saying "It really couldn't have been a better score" and GameSpot calling out the audio as "quite possibly the best part of the game". After his success with Fable, Shaw went on to compose the soundtracks for Fable II, Fable III and Fable: The Journey, all using the Slovak National Symphony Orchestra.

In 2012, Shaw decided to leave Lionhead and go freelance, forming his own music production company.

In 2014/2015, Shaw composed the soundtrack for the computer game Satellite Reign, which incorporated themes from the first 2 games in the Syndicate series.

In the summer of 2015, Shaw composed and recorded the orchestral score for the now cancelled Lionhead game Fable Legends, with the Philharmonia Orchestra.

In June 2016, Shaw composed the music for the Google VR title Earthshape by Bithell Games.

In October 2016, Shaw completed the orchestral score for the Sky TV movie adaptation of The Last Dragonslayer by Jasper Fforde.

In April 2019, Shaw joined Wargaming UK (rebranded as DPS Games in 2020) as Audio Director.

Shaw's comment about his work in the game audio area:

"I would not want to go back to the early days of game audio design. This was a time when audio was very much the afterthought. Nowadays, I need to be in on the early conceptual stages of game design if the game is going to sound any good. The audio designer can bring as much to the early game design as anyone else can."

== See also ==
- Fable Original Soundtrack
- Fable II Original Soundtrack
- Fable III Original Soundtrack
