= Magic Carpet (video game) =

1994 video game

- European MS-DOS cover art
- Developers: Bullfrog Productions; Krisalis Software (PS1 & Saturn)
- Publisher: Electronic Arts
- Designers: Jonty Barnes; Sean Masterson; Barry Meade; Daniel Russell; Alex Trowers
- Programmers: Sean Cooper; Mark Huntley
- Composer: Russell Shaw
- Platforms: MS-DOS, PlayStation, Saturn
- Release: 1994: MS-DOS; 1995: Expansion; 1996: PlayStation, Saturn
- Genre: Action
- Modes: Single-player, multiplayer

Magic Carpet is a 3D flying video game developed by Bullfrog Productions and published by Electronic Arts in 1994 for MS-DOS, PlayStation, and Sega Saturn platforms. Its graphics and gameplay were considered innovative and technically impressive at the time of its release.

An expansion pack, Magic Carpet: Hidden Worlds, was released for MS-DOS compatible operating systems in 1995 and added 25 levels and winter-themed graphics. A compilation package, Magic Carpet Plus, which included the main game and the expansion, was used as the basis for PlayStation and Sega Saturn ports that were released in 1996. A sequel was released in 1995, Magic Carpet 2: The Netherworlds.

== Plot ==
The player plays a wizard on a magic carpet flying over water, mountains and other terrain while destroying monsters and rival wizards (which are controlled by the computer) and collecting "mana" which is gathered by hot air balloons and stored in the player's own castle.

The story is told in a cutscene that depicts the pages of a book being flipped. According to this backstory, mana was discovered and though it initially had beneficial uses, the quest for it made the lands barren. Worse, many corrupt wizards began turning to mana for their own nefarious purposes, eventually leading to war between them. The battling wizards began using more destructive spells and summoning deadly monsters, the latter of which often turned against them. One wizard hoped to end everything with an all-powerful spell but instead only left the worlds shattered. Only his apprentice survived and his goal is to restore the worlds to equilibrium.

== Gameplay ==
The player has to visit a series of small spherical "worlds" (45 in the original game (Note: The box says 50, but levels 9, 18, 29, 34, and 40 are not actually present in the game.) and an additional 25 in the expansion). The goal in each world is to build a castle and fill it with the necessary percentage of the total mana in the current level (or "world"), thus restoring it to "equilibrium". The total mana level is fixed in each world. To accomplish this, the player has to possess the mana so that mana-collecting balloons bring them to the player's castle (the balloons ignore mana that are unpossessed or possessed by an enemy wizard). Mana, represented by pearls of varying sizes, may be found freely in the world but is primarily gathered by destroying monsters and/or leveling castles of enemy wizards.

The player is fighting two enemies.

As the player expands the castle, it spawns additional balloons and armed guards that defend the castle against attacks by enemy wizards. The player character can have up to two spells equipped at a time, one for each hand. Greater amounts of mana stored in the castle allow the player to expand the castle and cast more powerful spells. Besides storing mana, the player's castle also serves as a home base for the player character where he can regain health and mana. Upon death, the player character respawns at his castle. Dying without a castle forces the player to restart the level since the game does not have a mid-level save feature. As long as the player's castle is at least partly intact, the player character cannot die.

The magic carpet can be piloted in three dimensions, similar to a helicopter, although the player cannot roll and it is impossible to crash. Instead, when the carpet approaches an obstacle, it automatically ascends to fly over the obstacle.

== Development ==
The game was promoted with a marketing budget of $307,600.

The game supported anaglyph 3D and autostereogram effects. 3D glasses came with the game package and VFX1 Headgear was supported.

== Ports ==
=== PlayStation ===
The PlayStation version retains many of the PC version's spells. The map has changed slightly, and some of the monster graphics and enemy wizard graphics are slightly different. As in the PC game, one can only save at the end of the level. Enemy wizards now have a health-bar over their heads, so the player can see when they are close to death. This version does not support multiplayer, but does contain the Hidden Worlds expansion as a reward for finishing the game in "Normal" mode.

=== Saturn ===
There was also a port for the Sega Saturn console. It is largely identical to the PlayStation version, and likewise includes the Hidden Worlds expansion. Gaming journalist Ed Lomas reported the technical differences from the PlayStation version as: the sky is animated in a "sliding wallpaper" fashion (whereas it moves in 3D in the PlayStation version), the sprites are more detailed, and the shadows lack the translucency effect.

=== Atari Jaguar CD ===
A port for the Atari Jaguar CD was in development after Atari Corporation made a deal with Electronic Arts to bring some of the latter's titles to the system in the middle of 1995, with Magic Carpet being among them. The port was announced during the same month for a general 1995 release and later slated for a December 1995 release. Despite kept being advertised in magazine ads and catalogs, in addition to internal documents from Atari Corp. still listing the port under development, this version was never released. Mike Diskett, one of the playtesters of the title and programmer of the Atari Jaguar versions of Syndicate and Theme Park, revealed in a 2015 forum post at AtariAge that before Atari bought the rights to the title, he had tried porting Magic Carpet to the Jaguar during his spare time and concluded that it was impossible due to the Jaguar's difficulty with texture mapping.

=== 3DO ===
A 3DO Interactive Multiplayer version of Magic Carpet was announced to be in development, but this port was never released for unknown reasons.

== Reception ==
Reception

Review scores
Publication	Score
AllGame	4.5/5 (PS1, SAT)
Computer Gaming World	5/5 (PC)
Edge	9/10 (PC)
Electronic Gaming Monthly	7/10 (PS1)
Next Generation	4/5 (SAT, PC); 3/5 (PS1)
Maximum	4/5 (SAT)
Sega Saturn Magazine	90% (SAT)

In the United Kingdom, it was among the nineteen best-selling PlayStation games of 1996, according to HMV.

Next Generation reviewed the PC version of the game, and stated that "Sure to be loads of fun for fans of any genre."

James V. Trunzo reviewed Magic Carpet in White Wolf Inphobia #56 (June, 1995), rating it a 5 out of 5 and stated that "Were it not for Wing Commander III, Magic Carpet might well be the Game of the Year. No doubt it will garner a good number of specialty awards, and they'll all be well deserved. Magic Carpet is guaranteed to ruin marriages, deprive you of sleep and possibly get you fired. It's highly addictive and worth all the trouble it will bring!"

Reviewing the Saturn version in GamePro, Tommy Glide lauded the game's massive size, wide open 3D environment, morphing terrain animations, subtle touches to the sound effects, and accessible controls. He concluded that "If you want to break out of those corridor adventures and play an original first-person shooter, test-drive this carpet of the Persian persuasion." Sam Hickman of Sega Saturn Magazine approved of both the originality of the game and the accuracy of the Saturn port, summarizing that "as a conversion, Magic Carpet is actually very good. As a game in its own right it's nigh on brilliant." She criticized the absence of multiplayer mode, but praised the inclusion of additional levels and a new spell, as well as the more streamlined spell system, and described it as one of the Saturn's most visually impressive games to date. Maximum assessed that the Saturn version is graphically less impressive than the PC and PlayStation versions, but carries over the gameplay flawlessly. They praised the game itself for its deep and original yet enjoyable gameplay, summarizing it as "a perfect mix of strategy and mindless blasting."

Reviewing the PlayStation version, the four reviewers of Electronic Gaming Monthly commented that the controls and interface are confusing at first, and that the graphics become pixelated when getting close to objects, but three of the four felt that it was an overall enjoyable game. Tommy Glide gave it the same ratings as the Saturn version in all four categories, and reiterated his praises for that version. Next Generation commented in a brief review that "Magic Carpet has a lot of challenging action. But a weird control scheme and so-so graphics fail to deliver." However, the magazine's review of the Saturn version in the same issue was much more positive, praising the originality, demanding strategy, massive length, and "airy, mystical quality".

In 1996, Computer Gaming World named Magic Carpet the 137th best game ever. The editors wrote, "Darned weird rules were offset by a rich, 3D world to explore and conquer." In 1996, GamesMaster ranked Magic Carpet 26th in their "Top 100 Games of All Time."
