= List of Lionhead Studios games =

Video games by developer

Lionhead Studios was a British video game developer located in Guildford, England. It was founded in July 1997 by Peter Molyneux, Mark Webley, Tim Rance, and Steve Jackson, following their departure from Bullfrog Productions, which Molyneux had co-founded in 1987. In 2001 it released its first title, the real-time strategy game Black & White; over the next year it launched deals with independent studios Big Blue Box Studios and Intrepid Computer Entertainment, who were developing Fable and B.C., respectively, to serve as a producer for their games. In 2002, after helping them sign publishing deals with Microsoft Game Studios, Lionhead purchased the companies outright, though they continued as satellite studios working on their games. After the launch and success of the action role-playing game Fable in 2004, however, at the urging of Microsoft B.C. was cancelled and Intrepid shut down, and Unity, a collaboration between Lionhead Studios and Llamasoft, was also cancelled. The following year Lionhead released the games they had been developing at their main studio, Black & White 2 and business simulation game The Movies, neither of which were as successful as the company's first two titles. Lionhead had financial difficulties as a result, and was purchased by Microsoft Game Studios in 2006.

Over the next decade, Lionhead only released titles in the Fable series; although several other projects were worked on, such as Project Dimitri, Survivors, and Project Milo, sometimes for years, none turned into published products. Lionhead released five titles in the series between 2008 and 2012, including action role-playing games, a beat 'em up game, and a tie-in minigame pack. Molyneux, the face of the company, left in 2012, before the company's final two games were released that year. In 2016, with no further titles finished, the studio was shut down by Microsoft, cancelling its in-progress projects Fable Fortune and Fable Legends, the latter while in closed beta. During its lifetime Lionhead Studios released nine games, primarily for Microsoft Windows personal computers and Xbox consoles, and worked on at least ten other titles which were cancelled in various stages of development.

== Games ==
Games developed by Lionhead Studios
Game	Details
Black & White Original release date: 27 March 2001	Release years by system: 2001 – Windows; 2002 – MacOS
Black & White Original release date: 27 March 2001	Notes: Real-time strategy game; Published by Electronic Arts; Part of the Black & White series; Ports for the PlayStation and Dreamcast planned for release in 2001, and ports for the PlayStation 2 and Xbox planned for release in 2002, but all were cancelled; An expansion pack, Black & White: Creature Isle (2002), developed by Lionhead Studios and published by Electronic Arts; Black & White Deluxe (2003, Windows) and Black & White: Platinum Pack (2004, MacOS) include the original game and Creature Isle
Fable Original release date: 14 September 2004	Release years by system: 2004 – Xbox; 2005 – Windows (The Lost Chapters); 2008 – MacOS (The Lost Chapters); 2014 – Xbox 360 (Anniversary)
Fable Original release date: 14 September 2004	Notes: Action role-playing game; Published by Microsoft Game Studios; Part of the Fable series; Expanded and re-released as Fable: The Lost Chapters on Xbox, Windows (2005) and MacOS (2008); Remade as Fable Anniversary on Windows and Xbox 360 (2014), including The Lost Chapters; Fable Anniversary included in Fable Trilogy compilation release (2014, Xbox 360)
Black & White 2 Original release date: 3 October 2005	Release years by system: 2005 – Windows; 2009 – MacOS
Black & White 2 Original release date: 3 October 2005	Notes: Real-time strategy game; Published by Electronic Arts; Part of the Black & White series; Sequel to Black & White; An expansion pack, Black & White 2: Battle of the Gods (2006), developed by Lionhead Studios and published by Electronic Arts
The Movies Original release date: 8 November 2005	Release years by system: 2005 – Windows; 2006 – MacOS
The Movies Original release date: 8 November 2005	Notes: Business simulation game; Published by Activision; Ports for the GameCube, Xbox and PlayStation 2 were cancelled; An expansion pack, The Movies: Stunts & Effects (2006), developed by Lionhead Studios and published by Activision; The Movies: Superstar Edition (2009, MacOS) includes the original game and Stunts & Effects
Fable II Pub Games Original release date: 13 August 2008	Release years by system: 2008 – Xbox 360
Fable II Pub Games Original release date: 13 August 2008	Notes: Pub games; Developed by Carbonated Games and Lionhead Studios; Published by Microsoft Game Studios; Part of the Fable series; Tie-in game to Fable II, featuring three minigames from that game
Fable II Original release date: 21 October 2008	Release years by system: 2008 – Xbox 360
Fable II Original release date: 21 October 2008	Notes: Action role-playing game; Published by Microsoft Game Studios; Part of the Fable series; Sequel to Fable; A port for Windows was cancelled; Two pieces of downloadable content (DLC) released, "Knothole Island" and "See the Future"; base game and DLC included in Fable II: Game of the Year Edition (2009), also released as Fable II (2009) in the "Platinum Hits" line; Included in Fable Trilogy compilation release (2014, Xbox 360)
Fable III Original release date: 26 October 2010	Release years by system: 2010 – Xbox 360; 2011 – Windows
Fable III Original release date: 26 October 2010	Notes: Action role-playing game; Published by Microsoft Game Studios; Part of the Fable series; Sequel to Fable II; Two expansion DLCs released, "Understone Quest Pack" and "Traitor's Keep"; additional DLC content also released; Tie-in game Fable: Coin Golf (2011) for Windows Phone 7 developed by Ideaworks Game Studio and published by Microsoft Game Studios; Included in Fable Trilogy compilation release (2014, Xbox 360)
Fable Heroes Original release date: 2 May 2012	Release years by system: 2012 – Xbox 360
Fable Heroes Original release date: 2 May 2012	Notes: Beat 'em up game; Published by Microsoft Studios; Part of the Fable series; Cross-game interaction with Fable: The Journey
Fable: The Journey Original release date: 9 October 2012	Release years by system: 2012 – Xbox 360
Fable: The Journey Original release date: 9 October 2012	Notes: Action role-playing game; Published by Microsoft Studios; Part of the Fable series; Sequel to Fable III

=== Cancelled ===
Cancelled games developed by Lionhead Studios
Game	Details
Black & White: Titan Cancellation date: 2002	Proposed system release: Xbox, GameCube, PlayStation 2
Black & White: Titan Cancellation date: 2002	Notes: Announced in 2001, last update in 2002; never officially cancelled; Part of the Black & White series
B.C. Cancellation date: 22 October 2004	Proposed system release: Xbox
B.C. Cancellation date: 22 October 2004	Notes: Action-adventure game; Under development by Intrepid Computer Entertainment prior to its purchase by Lionhead
Untitled B.C. sequel Cancellation date: 22 October 2004	Proposed system release: N/A
Untitled B.C. sequel Cancellation date: 22 October 2004	Notes: Cancelled alongside B.C.
Unity Cancellation date: 10 December 2004	Proposed system release: GameCube
Unity Cancellation date: 10 December 2004	Notes: Shooter game, music game; Was being developed by Lionhead Studios and Llamasoft
The Room Cancellation date: 2005	Proposed system release: N/A
The Room Cancellation date: 2005	Notes: Designed by the founders of Media Molecule: Alex Evans, Mark Healey, Kareem Ettouney, and Dave Smith; Was shown at the 2005 Game Developer's Conference; Used a similar gameplay concept to Valve's Portal
Project Dimitri Cancellation date: 2006	Proposed system release: N/A
Project Dimitri Cancellation date: 2006	Notes: Game iterated through several concepts under the same project name starting in 2001; Later inspired Project Milo
Survivors Cancellation date: 2007	Proposed system release: N/A
Survivors Cancellation date: 2007	Notes: Third-person shooter
Justice and Survivor Cancellation date: 2009	Proposed system release: N/A
Justice and Survivor Cancellation date: 2009	Notes: Game cancelled while in concept stage
Project Milo Cancellation date: September 2010	Proposed system release: Xbox 360
Project Milo Cancellation date: September 2010	Notes: Simulation game; Originally announced at E3 2009 as part of public reveal of Kinect motion detection device
InkQuest Cancellation date: 24 September 2014	Proposed system release: N/A
InkQuest Cancellation date: 24 September 2014	Notes: Announced as a cancelled game by internal incubation group
Fable Legends Cancellation date: 7 March 2016	Proposed system release: Windows, Xbox One
Fable Legends Cancellation date: 7 March 2016	Notes: Cooperative action role-playing game; Part of the Fable series; Project cancelled when Lionhead Studios shut down while in closed beta
Fable Fortune Cancellation date: 7 March 2016	Proposed system release: Windows, Xbox One
Fable Fortune Cancellation date: 7 March 2016	Notes: Digital collectible card game; Part of the Fable series; Project cancelled when Lionhead Studios shut down; Developers of the game founded Flaming Fowl Studios to complete it; was finished with assistance by Mediatonic and released on 22 February 2018
