= Fable (2027 video game) =

Upcoming video game

- Developer: Playground Games (Note: Additional work by Eidos-Montréal and Third Kind Games. Blizzard Entertainment assisted with art and cinematics.)
- Publisher: Xbox Game Studios
- Director: Ralph Fulton
- Producers: Rachel Hardy; Ian Mitchell
- Designer: Will Kennedy
- Programmer: David Springate
- Artist: Conar Cross
- Writers: Martin Lancaster; Craig Owens; Anna Megill; Andrew Walsh
- Composer: Jacob Shea
- Series: Fable
- Engine: ForzaTech
- Platforms: PlayStation 5; Windows; Xbox Series X/S
- Release: 23 February 2027 (Note: Pre-ordering the Premium Edition grants five-day early access beginning on 18 February 2027.)
- Genre: Action role-playing
- Mode: Single-player

Fable is an upcoming action role-playing game developed by Playground Games and published by Xbox Game Studios. It is the fourth mainline instalment in the Fable series. The game scheduled to be released on 23 February 2027, for PlayStation 5, Windows, and Xbox Series X/S. Fable is not a continuation of the original trilogy and does not follow its established timeline or characters. It serves as a beginning that reimagines the world of Albion while retaining elements of the original games, including moral choices, player freedom, British humour, and the concept of Heroes.

The game is set in the fictional kingdom of Albion. Players create and control a Hero whose appearance can be customised. The story begins during the protagonist's childhood, when their heroic abilities emerge, before a time jump moves the story into adulthood. The main narrative begins in the protagonist's home village of Briar Hill, where a mysterious stranger turns the village's inhabitants, including the Hero's grandmother, to stone. The Hero leaves the village to discover who is responsible and find a way to reverse what happened.

Fable is played from a third-person perspective and features an open world environment. Gameplay combines melee weapons, ranged weapons, and magic through a combat system described by Playground Games as "style-weaving", allowing players to transition between different forms of combat without interrupting the flow of battle. The game features a morality system in which the player's decisions affect their relationships with Albion's inhabitants and can have consequences throughout the world. A population system known as the "Living Population" gives more than 1,000 non-player characters individual personalities, routines, and relationships that continue to develop while the player is away.

Development began as an effort to revive the Fable franchise following the closure of original developer Lionhead Studios. Playground Games has described the project as its own interpretation of Fable, rather than an attempt to reproduce Lionhead's games. The developers have emphasised that the reboot is intended to preserve the conceptual identity of the series while introducing a modern open world design and an interpretation of Albion.

== Gameplay ==
Third-person perspective, with the player-created character visible on screen

Fable is a fairy tale-themed action role-playing game played from a third-person perspective. Players create their own Hero and can customize their character's appearance, including their head, hairstyle, and skin tone. The player character's identity and reputation are shaped through choices made throughout the game. The game takes place in an open world version of Albion. Fable games allows players to freely explore its environments. Locations include forests, villages, countryside, caves, and the city of Bowerstone. The world is populated by non-player characters whose behaviour and relationships change over time.

Combat combines melee combat, ranged weapons, and magic. Players can switch seamlessly between the three combat styles, with their choice of weapons, equipment, and spells affecting their playstyle. Melee weapons vary in speed, power, and attack range. For example, heavier weapons can deal greater damage and strike multiple enemies, while the Hero can dodge, parry, perform charged attacks, and execute weapon-specific finishing moves. Enemies can be dismembered during combat, with damaged skeleton enemies continuing to fight despite losing body parts.

Ranged combat allows the Hero to attack enemies and target specific weak points from a distance. Different ranged weapons offer varying characteristics, such as greater accuracy or faster firing rates. Shooting certain parts of an enemy can produce different effects, such as causing an enemy to stumble. Magic provides offensive, defensive, and utility abilities. Spells can be equipped to different slots and cast during combat, with individual spells entering a cooldown after use. Spells shown in the game include Fireball, Lightning, Blades, Lift, Rush, Push, and Befowl, the latter of which transforms enemies into chickens. Several abilities can be combined with melee or ranged attacks, allowing players to create different combat combinations and builds.

Combat encounters can involve large groups of enemies with different abilities and weaknesses. Enemy types include the Hollow Folk, a group of skeleton enemies with melee, ranged, and armored variants; Wraiths, flying ghosts that can spawn additional enemies; and the Lantern Keeper, a larger enemy with ranged attacks and a destructible weak point. The game encourages players to combine melee, ranged, and magical abilities depending on the enemies they encounter. Exploration is a major component of the game. Players can travel throughout Albion and discover characters, quests, locations, and activities outside the main story. Playground Games has stated that players have considerable freedom in deciding where to go after leaving Briar Hill. The game retains the series' emphasis on humour and player choice, with decisions affecting how characters perceive the Hero, their relationships, and the wider world.

The game features a large population of individually simulated non-player characters (NPCs) known as the Living Population. Developer Playground Games describes the system as containing more than 1,000 NPCs, each with their own personality and life. Players can interact with these characters and develop different relationships with them, including friendship, hostility, employment, and marriage. NPCs continue their routines and relationships even when the player is not directly observing them.

Players are presented with moral decisions that can affect the Hero's reputation, relationships, and interactions with the inhabitants of Albion. Rather than classifying the Hero as good or evil, individual choices can have different consequences. For example, players may choose whether to kill or spare a talking pig, with such decisions influencing the Hero's reputation and how NPCs respond to them. The player's actions can affect the wider world and shape the stories and relationships that develop around individual characters.

== Plot ==
Fable is set in Albion, a fictional fantasy kingdom. Although the game uses the same setting name and incorporates recognizable elements from the original series, Playground Games has stated that the new game does not follow the established timeline of the original Fable games. The developers instead created a new interpretation of Albion that allows them to introduce new stories, characters, and locations without being restricted by previous continuity. Albion is presented as a fully open world containing a variety of towns, villages, cities, and natural environments, including forests, countryside, caves, and other areas that players can explore freely. Bowerstone returns as a major city, while smaller settlements such as Briar Hill provide different settings throughout the world. Rather than following a traditional high-fantasy setting, Albion is presented as a fairy-tale-inspired world, drawing on elements such as enchanted forests, magical creatures, legendary Heroes, and fantastical locations. This fairy-tale influence is combined with the series' characteristic dark humour and satire, giving Albion a setting that is whimsical and fantastical while also incorporating darker themes. The world is inhabited by humans, magical creatures, Heroes, and other supernatural beings. Classic elements from the series also return, including Demon Doors and chickens.

The player begins the game as a child living in the village of Briar Hill, where they discover that they possess heroic powers. A time jump then moves the story forward, with the player character returning as an adult. The central conflict begins when a mysterious stranger turns the inhabitants of Briar Hill to stone, including the Hero's grandmother. The Hero leaves the village to investigate what happened and find a way to reverse the petrification. The Hero's journey eventually brings them into contact with other Heroes and forces threatening Albion. Among the confirmed characters is Isabel, the Hero of Wraithmarsh, portrayed by Hayley Atwell. Isabel is described as a Hero haunted by her past who believes that Albion does not need traditional Heroes and instead needs her own uncompromising approach to solving its problems. The Jack of Blades, one of the most recognisable villains from the original Fable games, also appears in the reboot. Playground Games has confirmed his presence but has not publicly revealed the full nature of his role in the story. Another major character is Humphry, a former Hero who has been forced out of retirement to assist the player character. He is portrayed by actor Matt King.

== Development ==
Original Fable developer Lionhead Studios was closed by Microsoft in April 2016, following the release of its final title, the Kinect-based Fable: The Journey (2012) for Xbox 360 which was critically panned. Lionhead's closure placed the Fable series on hiatus and resulted in the cancellation of Fable Legends. Microsoft would later go on to state they mismanaged the company, using Lionhead Studios to advance and stir interest in Microsoft projects "A couple of years later we reflected back on that experience. What did we learn, and how do we not repeat our same mistakes? You acquire a studio for what they’re great at now, and your job is to help them accelerate how they do what they do, not them accelerate what you do,” said Phil Spencer, Head of Xbox."

The first indication of a possible new installment came in April 2017, when Phil Spencer, head of Xbox, stated that the franchise had "a lot of places it could go". After releasing Forza Horizon 3 in 2016, Playground Games sought to branch out from the Forza series. According to Playground general manager Ralph Fulton, the studio believed that its experience in "open world game design, open-world technology, and open-world streaming" could be transferred to another type of game. In 2017, Playground Games created a dedicated development team for Fable separate from the main Forza Horizon team. In early 2018, Eurogamer reported that Playground Games had initiated the development of the fourth installment in the Fable series. Later that year, it was disclosed that Playground Games was actively recruiting for 177 positions dedicated to an open-world role-playing game. In June 2018, Playground Games was officially acquired by Xbox Game Studios.

Playground Games wanted to reboot the Fable series with a new installment under the simple title of Fable rather than creating Fable 4. They wanted to make their own version of Fable, feeling it would be "inauthentic" to continue Lionhead's work as a different studio with a different internal culture. They approached the reboot by identifying the characteristics that it considered fundamental to Fable. Rather than directly reproduce Lionhead's design, the team sought to retain the series' moral choices, humour, player expression, fantasy setting, and consequences while creating a modern interpretation. The developers particularly emphasised that the game should remain recognisably Fable while reflecting Playground Games' own creative identity. Fulton said the team did not want to simply imitate Lionhead's work, describing the project as "Playground's Fable." With their Fable title, Playground created a new story in the world of Albion rather than continue the original timeline or characters.

By March 2023, the game was reported to be in the early stages of full production. However, Fable suffered from an identity crisis during development with the team at Playground Games unsure about what they wanted the game to be. The term "Witcher-like" was being used within Playground as a direction to potentially take the game. Eidos-Montréal and Third Kind Games are supporting the development of Fable, while Blizzard Entertainment's cinematics team is supporting the game's art and cinematics. A July 2026 report claimed that Fable had gone "uncomfortably" over budget during its development period.

=== Gameplay ===
The open-world structure represents one of the largest changes from the earlier games. Playground Games sought to create an Albion that could function as an active part of the story rather than simply serving as a collection of locations. NPCs have individual routines and relationships, while player actions can produce consequences that remain visible in the world. The studio's experience with large open-world environments influenced the game's approach to Albion and its exploration systems. Ralph Fulton serves as the game's director, while Will Kennedy is the game's designer. The development team also includes Craig Littler, who serves as level design director, and Grant Orban, who serves as senior game designer. Littler and Orban previously worked on the Forza Horizon series, while Kennedy worked at Rockstar North on Grand Theft Auto V and its Online component.

=== Writing ===
In December 2020, Anna Megill, a former developer from Remedy Entertainment, assumed the role of lead writer for the project. Megill was subsequently promoted to narrative lead in July. In October 2022, Andrew Walsh, senior writer for Horizon Forbidden West, joined the Fable team. Playground Games sought to maintain the British humour from the original Fable games which it saw as essential to the series. The studio took inspiration from British comedies like Peep Show, The IT Crowd and The Office for a "really grounded, awkward style of humour". Fable will feature over 150,000 lines of dialogue across its 1,000 handcrafted NPCs, equivalent to 1,000 hours of voice recordings.

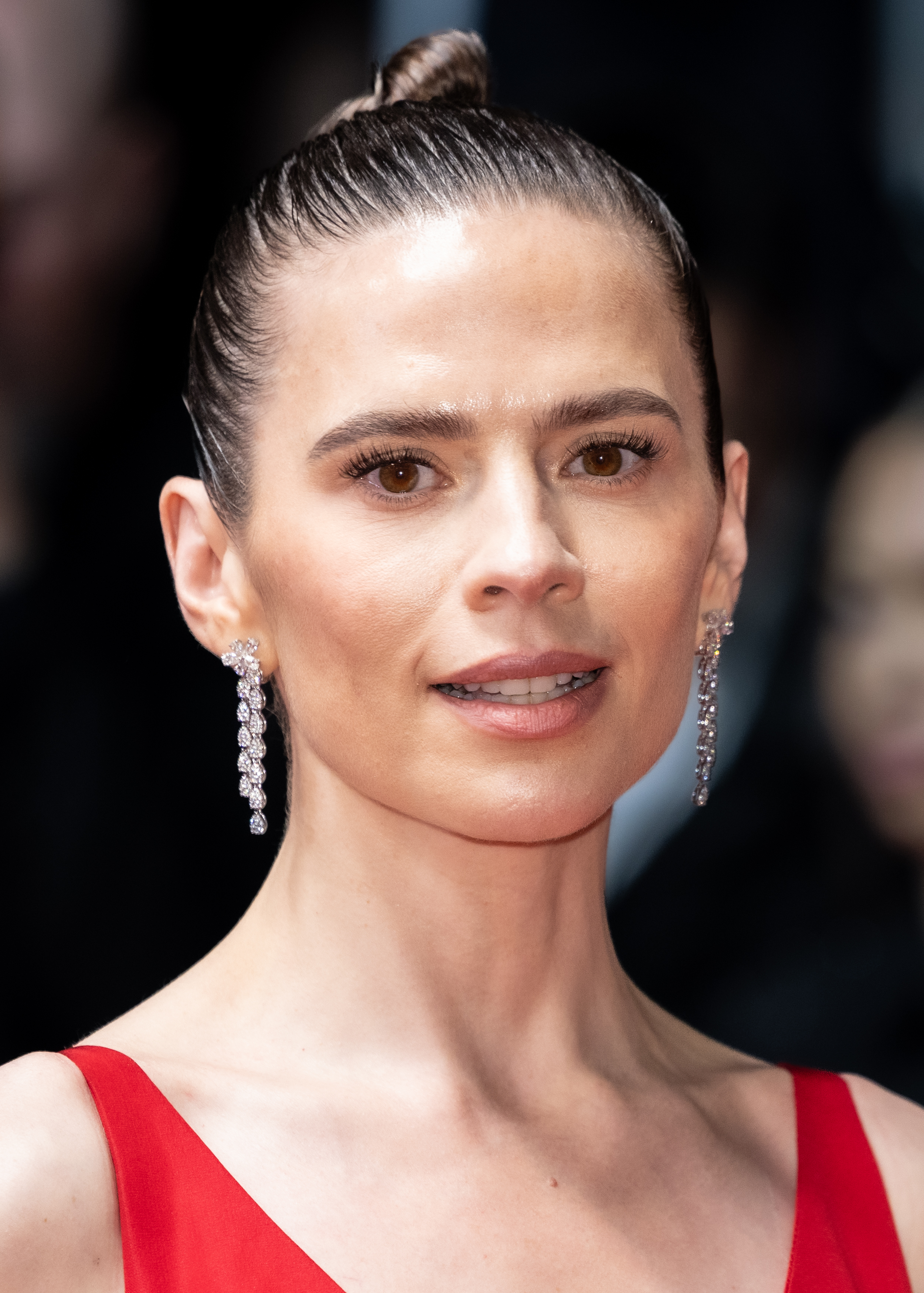
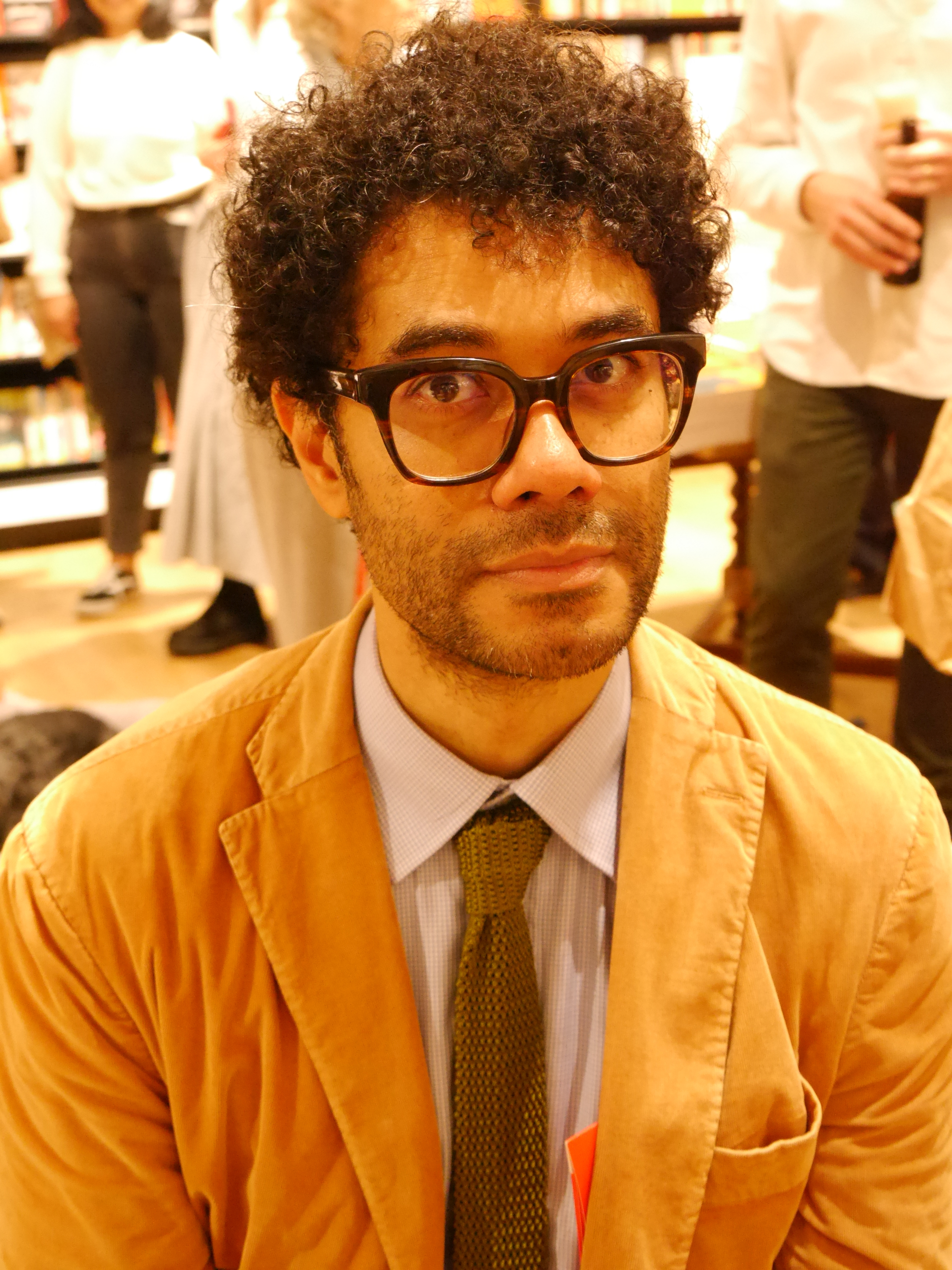
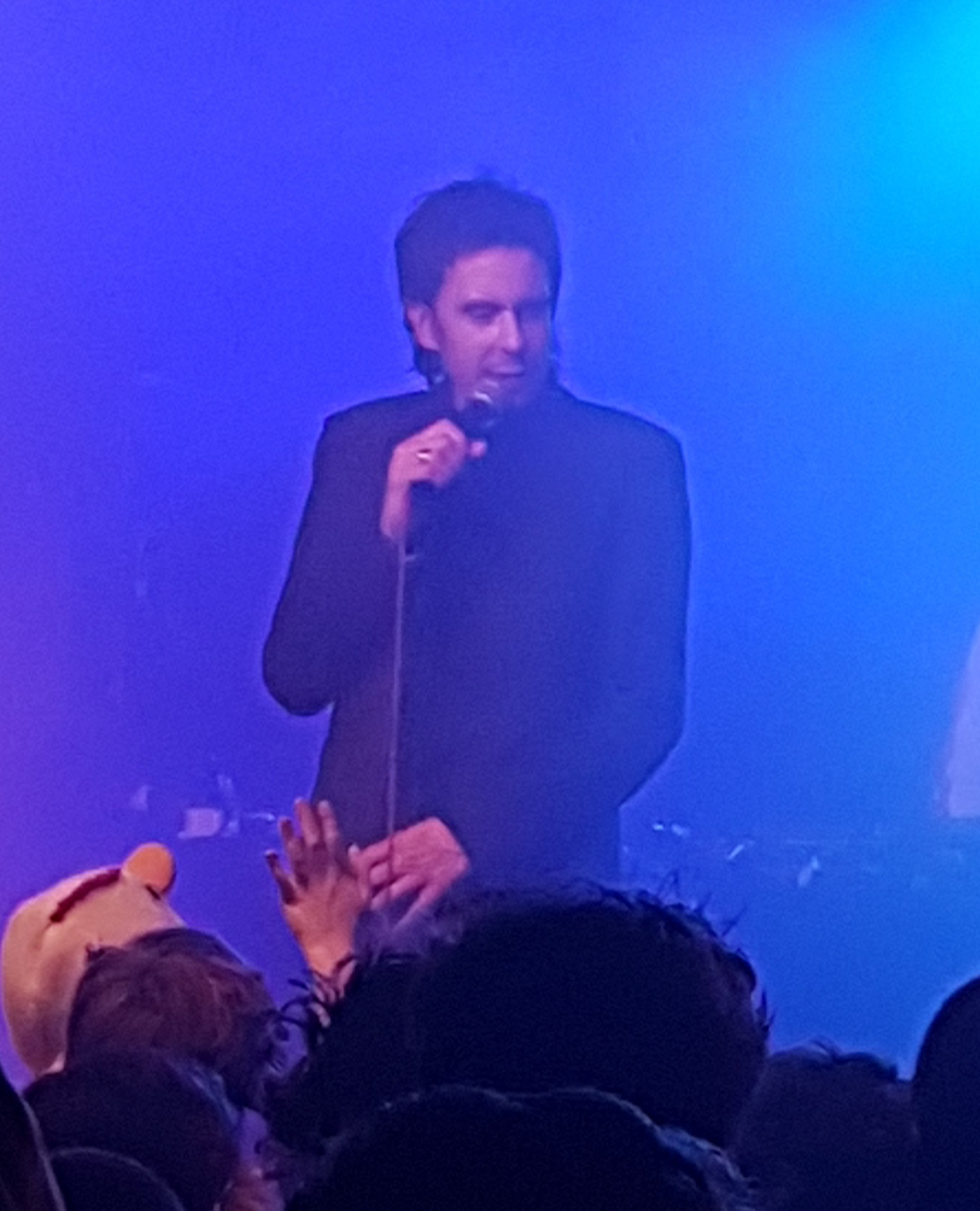
Fable's cast includes Hayley Atwell and British comedians Richard Ayoade and Matt King.

=== Casting ===
The protagonist of Fable, the Hero of Briar Hill, is voiced by Lily Nichol and Ukweli Roach who provide the respective female and male voices. Fable is Nichol's video game acting debut while Roach had previous roles in Assassin's Creed Valhalla and Horizon Forbidden West. Nichol and Roach were commended by narrative director Craig Owens as having "great range paired with natural charisma". Hayley Atwell was cast as villain Isabel, the Hero of Wraithmarsh with her casting being announced on 7 June 2026 during the Xbox Games Showcase. She was cast due to her "ability to combine vulnerability with strength" according to Owens. Natasia Demetriou plays Jenny, one of the two feuding heirs to the city of Bloodstone. She feuds with Jacob, portrayed by Nathan Foad who was able to act as a "perfect comedic foil to Jenny in his scenes with Natasia". Around 100 actors were cast to voice the Living Population.

=== Technology ===
Fable is powered by ForzaTech, an in-house engine created by Turn 10 Studios and used by both Turn 10 and Playground Games to develop all Forza titles. As ForzaTech was intended for racing game development, Playground Games had to build additional technology on top of the base engine to better accommodate a third-person action-adventure game with characters rather than cars. The ForzaTech engine already was capable of high fidelity graphics rendering and data streaming so Playground Games had to invest additional work into animation and cinematics. There was debate within Playground on whether they should continue to use ForzaTech for a non-racing title or move to Unreal Engine for Fable. The decision to use ForzaTech reportedly extended the development time of Fable due to the additional work needed and Microsoft's insistence on its studios using their own tools.

== Marketing and release ==
Forbes reported on a leaked video related to Fable by Playground Games ahead of E3 2019. In July 2020, the game was announced at the Xbox Games Showcase, alongside the Xbox Series X/S console reveals, and was touted as a "new beginning" for the series.

The game received its first in-game trailer at the Xbox Games Showcase on 11 June 2023, featuring actor Richard Ayoade as a giant. During the Xbox Showcase on 9 June 2024, Playground Games announced that the game would launch in 2025 for Xbox Series X/S and Windows and actor-comedian Matt King was revealed to be playing Humphry, the former hero of Albion who is forced out of retirement to aid the player character. On 25 February 2025, Head of Xbox Game Studios Craig Duncan announced that the launch of the game was moved to 2026.

On 8 January 2026, Xbox announced that Fable would be featured at Xbox Developer Direct on 22 January 2026, where Playground Games would present a deep dive into the gameplay. It was also announced that the game would launch simultaneously on PlayStation 5, Xbox Series X/S, and Windows in Autumn 2026. Fable is scheduled for Game Pass from day one.

On 29 May 2026, Xbox's chief content officer, Matt Booty, announced that Fable's release date had been moved to February 2027 "so it can have the dedicated moment it deserves" with enough space from other releases, including Grand Theft Auto VI in November. A follow up trailer was shown during the Xbox Games Showcase on 7 June 2026 that confirmed Fable's release date being 23 February 2027.

== Reception ==
=== Awards ===
Year	Award	Category	Result	Ref.
2026	Golden Joystick Awards	Most Wanted Game	Nominated	
2026	The Game Awards 2026	Most Anticipated Game	Pending	
