= Fable Fortune =

2018 video game

- Developers: Flaming Fowl Studios, Mediatonic
- Publisher: Mediatonic
- Series: Fable
- Platforms: Microsoft Windows, Xbox One
- Release: February 22, 2018
- Genre: Digital collectible card game

Fable Fortune was a free-to-play digital collectible card game set in the Fable universe. Developed by Flaming Fowl Studios and Mediatonic, it was released for Windows and Xbox One in February 2018, after an initial early access release. In late 2019, Flaming Fowl Studios announced their intent to cease work on further updates for the game, citing its lacklustre performance on the market. The support for the game was finally discontinued in March 2020.

== Gameplay ==
Fable Fortune is a digital collectible card game. Players build their 30-card decks around individual heroes, who have unique spells with a variety of effects to add to your deck, alongside cards available to all decks. The player who goes second gets a 31st card to balance the first-mover advantage. The game has a morality component, similar to the role-playing elements of the main games in the franchise; at the beginning of a match players can choose an objective to work through during the match. Once achieving the objective, players can choose to upgrade their hero with "good" or "evil" powers. There are three objectives per match. Completed objectives also enable additional effects on cards with morality effects.

== Development and release ==
Fable developer Lionhead Studios began developing Fable Fortune in late 2014 as an unannounced project. At the same time, Lionhead was publicly developing Fable Legends. Microsoft shut down the studio in April 2016, ending development on Legends and Fortune. Microsoft offered the Fable license to Flaming Fowl Studios, an independent developer formed of former Lionhead staff. Seeking to continue work on Fortune, Flaming Fowl turned to a Kickstarter crowdfunding campaign in May 2016, looking to raise £250,000 towards the game's development costs. The campaign failed its target and was cancelled in June. Flaming Fowl CEO Craig Oman cited difficulties in crowdfunding a free-to-play title, and the unfamiliar genre for the Fable universe as reasons for the failure. The game did however attract private funding, allowing its development to continue. The game was released as early access for Windows and Xbox One in July 2017, and was co-developed by Flaming Fowl Studios and Mediatonic. The game launched out of early access on February 22, 2018.

== Reception ==
Reception

Aggregate score
Aggregator	Score
Metacritic	PC: 63/100; XONE: 70/100

Fable Fortune received a mixed reception from critics.
