= Fable II Pub Games =

2008 video game

- Developers: Carbonated Games; Lionhead Studios
- Publishers: Xbox Live Productions; Microsoft Game Studios
- Series: Fable
- Platform: Xbox 360
- Release: 13 August 2008
- Genre: Pub games
- Mode: Single-player

Fable II Pub Games is an Xbox Live Arcade game developed by Carbonated Games under the supervision of Lionhead Studios and released for the Xbox 360 in 2008. It includes three pub game-styled minigames called Keystone, Fortune's Tower and Spinnerbox that all share functionality with Fable II. The games are included in both editions of Fable II. It was also free for those who pre-ordered Fable II from participating retailers.

== Fable II ==
The Pub Games offer players a chance to win money and items for their Fable II character, to be given to them once their character has reached adulthood. For every piece of gold won in the tournament section of Pub Games, a piece of gold is added to the Fable II character's wallet, giving players a chance to have a rich character from the start of the game. Conversely, if the player accumulates debt in the Pub Games, negative consequences will befall their character. Fifteen unique items can also be won in the Pub Games' tournaments, ranging from weapons to clothing or tattoos that can be used by their Fable II character.

== Gameplay ==
Pub Games consists of three different casino-style games, of which only low-stakes versions can be played from the start. For every piece of gold the player bets on these games, they earn experience points that can be used to unlock higher-stakes versions and Fable II concept art. Tournaments for these games are also unlocked, giving players an opportunity to win items by competing with computer-controlled opponents.

=== Fortune's Tower ===
Fortune's Tower

Fortune's Tower is a card game utilizing a deck with multiples of the number one through seven. After players make an ante of a multiple of fifteen, they are dealt one face down "Gate" card and two face up cards on top of it. The player can choose to take the sum value of the row of two cards, or be dealt three new cards on top of the other two. The cycle repeats until an eighth row is created, at which point the player automatically receives a payout. If the player chooses to end the game before then the game automatically deals the rest of the cards to see what the outcome would have been. A pay multiplier can be activated if all the cards in a row are the same number (called a "Set"), which multiplies the bet by the number of cards in the row (a row of two threes causes the bet to double). Multiple Sets are not cumulative – the highest multiplier counts alone.

If a card is dealt atop a card of the same value, a game-ending condition known as "Misfortune" occurs. There are three "saves" that may avert a game ending with Misfortune: the Gate card will automatically replace the first Misfortune – if the Gate card is not the same number as the card it replaces, and there are no other Misfortunes in the current row of cards, the game can continue, then one of four "Hero" cards may be dealt during the course of the game, which saves all cards in the row it is dealt to from Misfortune, and a Set will remove any Misfortunes as well.

If the player completes the Tower without using a Gate card, the player receives a Jackpot, which gives him the total of all the rows, which is then multiplied if a Set is present.

=== Keystone ===
Keystone

Keystone is described by Peter Molyneux as "a bit of a cross between Roulette and Crappes". Rather than a spinning wheel, the player throws three six-sided dice, and makes bets prior to the throw on what the outcome will be, as in Roulette, picking the exact total, the range of the score, and so forth. The more uncommon the roll, the higher the payout (i.e. 3 and 18 pay the highest).

The major departure from Roulette is that the game is based around a stone arch composed of tiles from 3 to 18, with the 3, 10, 11, and 18 tiles being "Archstones". When dice are rolled, a tile to its corresponding result removes the tile. If either both the 10 and 11 Keystones or just one of the base (3 or 18) stones are removed, the game ends. The player must initially make an arch-bet (a bet on a Keystone) which remains throughout the game. If the die is rolled a value matching a removed stone, it removes the stone adjacent to it, based on its position (lower if it is 10 or less, higher if it is 11 or higher). If the first roll of the game is a 3 or 18, it is declared a Jackpot and all arch-bets automatically win; the game still ends.

A variation of the game is "Bloodstones" which features opposite rules, in which the player is betting against the die rolls.

=== Spinnerbox ===
Spinnerbox is a slot machine game, where players bet gold and spin anywhere from three to six different slots. The player wins payouts on "chains" (symbols connected adjacently), with each themed spinner having its own bonus rules. For example, "Cow and Corset" features a bonus fourth spinner if the player gets a three of a kind; the fourth spinner pays as if it were a three of a kind for whatever it reveals.

== Reception ==
Reception

Aggregate score
| Aggregator | Score |
|---|---|
| Metacritic | 53/100 |

Review scores
| Publication | Score |
|---|---|
| GameSpot | 6.5/10 |
| IGN | 6.4/10 |

On Metacritic, a website aggregating review scores, the game received a score of 53, indicating "mixed or average reviews".
