= Fable Heroes =

2012 video game

- Developer: Lionhead Studios
- Publisher: Microsoft Studios
- Composer: Robin Beanland
- Series: Fable
- Platform: Xbox 360
- Release: WW: 2 May 2012
- Genre: Beat 'em up
- Modes: Single-player, multiplayer

Fable Heroes is a beat 'em up video game in the Fable series, developed by Lionhead Studios and published by Microsoft Studios for Xbox 360. Announced at the 2012 Xbox Spring Showcase, it was released on 2 May that year as part of the Xbox Live Arcade Next Promotion. It is the first "family-friendly" game in the Fable series.

Lead designer Ted Timmins described how the team "brought a modern touch to the old and out dated side scroller". He also mentioned that Fable Heroes would connect with Fable: The Journey. By completing tasks in Fable Heroes the player will gain access to unique items in Fable: The Journey and vice versa. Additional avatar awards are also available in-game.

== Gameplay ==
Fable Heroes is a hack and slash adventure game. The player plays as one of 12 characters from across the four Fable games and are presented in a hero doll form which are a recognisable item from the series. The game features up to 4 player co-op through Xbox Live or through local multiplayer as well as online leaderboard and time trials for competitive play. In the game the player journeys through Albion and fights against familiar foes and new enemies to collect coins that are used to unlock new items and characters in Fable Heroes as well as Fable: The Journey, there are also boss fights in the game as well as smaller enemies which are fought in groups. Familiar enemies from the series include Chesty, Hobbes, Beetles and Hollow Men. There are also items in the levels, hidden within chests, that grant the player temporary abilities such as Slow Time, and items that give the player temporary disguises, like a Hobbe Costume, that hide the player from the relevant enemies so that they don't attack the player. The game also features mini-games that are separate from the main game and are based on various ideas from the series, which include mine cart racing and avoiding chickens for a certain amount of time.

== Development ==
Fable Heroes was started during the "Creative Day" that Lionhead Studios held every year (until lionheads closure is 2016), where anyone in Lionhead can show an idea for a game, the game was accepted and a small team of 5 people, led by lead designer Ted Timmins, began work on Fable Heroes in early 2011. The game was then revealed at the Xbox Spring Showcase in 2012 and was released on 2 May as the third title in the Arcade Next Promotion.

== Reception ==
Reception

Aggregate score
Aggregator	Score
Metacritic	55/100

Reviews for Fable Heroes have been fairly mixed, with a range of high and low review scores from various reviews, the lowest being from Destructoid which gave the game a 3.5 out of 10 saying that: "If it was even slightly exciting to play, all of its issues could be overlooked in favor of a capability to provide simple cooperative family entertainment. Unfortunately, it is not." As of July 2012, the game scores 55 out of 100 on Metacritic.
