= Fable (2004 video game) =

- Developers: Big Blue Box Studios; Lionhead Studios (The Lost Chapters / Anniversary); Robosoft Technologies (macOS)
- Publishers: Microsoft Game Studios; Feral Interactive (macOS)
- Producers: Louise Copley; Rick Martinez
- Designers: Peter Molyneux; Dene Carter; Ben Huskins; Mark Webley
- Programmers: Simon Carter; Ben Board
- Artists: Ian Yarwood-Lovett; Dean Finnigan
- Writer: James Leach
- Composers: Russell Shaw; Danny Elfman (intro theme)
- Series: Fable
- Engine: Unreal Engine 3 (Anniversary)
- Platforms: Xbox; Windows; macOS; Xbox 360
- Release: 14 September 2004: Xbox (original); NA: 14 September 2004; EU: 8 October 2004; AU: 14 October 2004 Xbox (The Lost Chapters); NA: 18 October 2005; EU: 21 October 2005; AU: 24 November 2005 Windows; NA: 20 September 2005; EU: 23 September 2005; AU: 1 October 2005 macOS; NA: 31 March 2008 Xbox 360 (Anniversary); NA: 4 February 2014; AU: 6 February 2014; EU: 7 February 2014 Windows (Anniversary) 12 September 2014
- Genre: Action role-playing
- Mode: Single-player

Fable is an action role-playing video game, the first in the Fable series. It was developed for the Xbox, Windows, and macOS platforms by Big Blue Box Studios, a satellite developer of Lionhead Studios, and was published by Microsoft Studios. The game shipped for the Xbox in September 2004. An extended version of the game, Fable: The Lost Chapters, was released for the Xbox and Windows in September 2005. A port of the game for macOS, created by Robosoft Technologies and published by Feral Interactive, was released in March 2008 after a delay of more than two years due to licensing issues.

Taking place in a fantasy world called Albion, players control an unnamed hero who joins the Heroes Guild after losing his family during a bandit attack on his hometown. Upon leaving the guild, the player is given a choice to decide whether the hero should live up to his name, or guide him on a path of darkness.

Originally developed under the name Project Ego, Fable's development involved more than 150 people. The game's music was composed by Russell Shaw, with the opening title theme written by Danny Elfman. The game's release was widely anticipated, due in part to Lionhead co-founder Peter Molyneux's enthusiastic hype of the game. The game was originally in development for the Dreamcast, but shifted to the Xbox after the Dreamcast was discontinued. Through Xbox Live, Fable supported the Live Aware feature. Fable is now supported again on the replacement Xbox online servers called Insignia.

Fable received generally positive reviews from critics for the quality of its gameplay and execution, though the failure to include many promised features was noted. Fable was the top-selling game of September 2004 and sold more than two million units by 2006. The game was followed by two sequels, Fable II in 2008, Fable III in 2010 and a reboot in development by Playground Games. Fable Anniversary, a high-definition remaster of the game that includes The Lost Chapters, was released for the Xbox 360 and Windows in February 2014.

== Gameplay ==
Screenshot of the PC version of Fable, showing the Hero fighting a bandit. In the top left of the screen are health and will meters, and in the top right is a map. Available spells are displayed on the bottom edge of the screen.

Fable is a role-playing video game where players control their character from a third-person perspective. The main character, known as The Hero of Oakvale, can interact with people and objects as well as battle foes. The goal of Fable is to complete missions called quests that advance the game's plot, but Fable also features optional quests and allows players to pursue actions not directly tied to story completion.

Most quests are acquired at a central location, known as the Heroes' Guild; required quests are marked with a gold symbol and advance the game's story, while optional quests are coloured silver and can be completed in any order. Some quests allow players to pick sides and aid either evil characters, such as bandits, or good characters, such as traders and guardsmen. Players can also boast after accepting a quest, wagering some of the quest's reward gold in exchange for a larger return if the player accomplishes their bet, such as sustaining no damage or undertaking the quest naked. Gold, which can be used to buy weapons and items, and renown, which affects the way townspeople react to the Hero. Heroes also earn trophies of their victories, which can be displayed to large groups of townspeople to earn more renown.

In addition to fighting with melee weapons (such as swords and maces) and ranged weapons (longbows and crossbows), Heroes can learn and use spells to empower their abilities, ward off damage, or harm foes. As players complete quests or defeat enemies, they gain general experience as well as experience based on whether they used melee attacks, ranged weapons, or magic; these bestow Strength, Skill, and Will experience, respectively. Experience can be spent at a platform in the Heroes' Guild to level up attributes. General experience can be used to modify all groups of attributes. Strength experience can only be used to modify three attributes: Physique, Health, and Toughness. The same applies to Skill which can only modify Speed, Accuracy, and Guile. Will can be used to upgrade player's total magic power or to learn and upgrade spells which are broken into three groups, Attack Spells, Surround Spells, and Physical Spells. The experience the main character gains can be multiplied during combat through the combat multiplier. As the character successfully hits an enemy, his combat multiplier increases. If the character is hit by the enemy, the combat multiplier drops down to the next multiple of five, or zero if below five.

Fable's game world is dotted with towns where recreational activities not related to combat can be undertaken. Enterprising Heroes can buy trade items such as beer kegs or grain sacks and sell them at other towns for profit. Towns are also prime locations to buy clothing, weapons, or other items. Many towns have houses for sale, which the Hero can buy, furnish, or lease to tenants for gold. Heroes may woo and marry men or women in each town.

=== Alignment ===
Positively and negatively-aligned Heroes

In Fable, a player's Hero has a measure of good or evil alignment based on the Hero's actions. Good deeds award good points, which produce a positive alignment, while committing evil acts adds evil points, producing a negative alignment. Killing monsters or saving villagers are acts of good, whereas killing innocents, breaking laws, or abusing a spouse will accumulate evil points. Consuming certain foodstuffs can also affect the Hero's alignment; for example, eating tofu will earn the hero positive points, while eating crunchy chicks (because crunchy chicks are assumed to be still alive) will earn evil points. The player may also pray at the temples of Avo and Skorm. Donations to the Temple of Avo will result in good points, while "gifts" to the Chapel of Skorm will result in evil points. The alignment affects not only the responses of non-player characters around the Hero, but also the appearance of the Hero himself. A Hero with a strongly positive alignment will feature a halo and a shaft of sparkling light above his head, butterflies fluttering around him and lighter features. An evil Hero emits a red haze from around his legs, draws flies, has glowing red eyes and grows horns.

Other actions besides alignment affect the Hero. Eating too much causes the character to gain weight, while drinking excessive amounts of beer causes Heroes to become sick and vomit. Clothing, which provides defence in combat situations, also changes the Hero's attractiveness or scariness as well as alignment in some cases, and townspeople's reactions to the Hero accordingly. Bright clothing makes the character look more noble to the townspeople, and thus cause them to praise and respect him. Dark clothing causes the character to seem evil or threatening to townspeople and cause them to fear him. Heroes can be further customised via hairstyles, facial hair, and tattoos. The Hero's attributes also affect appearance; high levels of Strength increase brawn, high levels of skill increase height, and high-level spells create glowing arcane patterns on the Hero's body.

== Synopsis ==
=== Setting ===
Fable takes place in Albion, a patchwork of city-states with lawless stretches of plains and forest between them. The entire land was once led by an ancient royal bloodline, bestowed with the title of Archon, referred to as the "Old Kingdom". The first Archon's rule was peaceful and prosperous, but the source of his power was an ancient and powerful sword (the Sword of Aeons) that gradually began to corrupt him and, eventually, his entire kingdom. By the time the events of the game take place, the world has slowly deteriorated from the days of the Old Kingdom. One of the most prominent institutions of Albion is the Heroes' Guild. The Guild is a centre of learning and training for Heroes, renowned mercenaries that are active in all parts of Albion. Heroes are hired as thieves, soldiers, guards, rescuers, and protectors; the Guild makes no moral judgement on the actions of its Heroes.

=== Plot ===
On his sister's birthday, a young boy's village of Oakvale is raided by bandits; killing the boy's father and abducting his mother and sister. An old Hero, Maze, rescues the boy and recruits him to be trained as a Hero at an academy called the Heroes' Guild. Years pass; after honing his skills, Maze informs the Hero of a blind seeress living among a bandit camp near Oakvale, and advises the Hero to infiltrate the bandit camp. To the Hero's surprise, the blind seeress is actually his older sister Theresa who was taken in by Twinblade, a former Hero and the present Bandit King. After a showdown with Twinblade, the Hero is given the choice of killing or sparing the bandit.

Later on in the Hero's life, after he has gained more recognition among the people of Albion, he is invited to fight in the Arena, where he meets the legendary Hero named Jack of Blades, who runs the arena battles. As a final challenge, Jack pits the Hero against his rival, which was also once his childhood friend/roommate back in the Guild—Whisper; when the Hero defeats her he may kill or spare her.

The Hero learns that Jack of Blades himself destroyed Oakvale during the Hero's childhood; aided by Theresa, the Hero discovers his mother alive in Bargate Prison. The Hero is captured in the rescue attempt and spends a year or more in the prison before finally escaping. Maze is revealed to be a traitor and working with Jack, having once more kidnapped Theresa. After defeating Maze, the Hero is led into a final confrontation with Jack where his mother is killed. Jack reveals that The Sword of Aeons can only be wielded if it receives the blood of Archon. The Sword of Aeons is said to be a very powerful sword of destruction. Upon the death of their mother, the Hero and Theresa are the only two remaining descendants of Archon, and if Jack destroys them both the sword will be even more powerful. After defeating Jack, the Hero must choose whether to keep the Sword of Aeons by killing his sister, or cast it away forever into a portal created by Jack of Blades' death.

Depending on the Hero's alignment and the player's choice of using or destroying the sword, there are a total of four different endings. Once the ending credits roll, players can resume their games.

In The Lost Chapters special edition, the story continues. After the defeat of Jack, the Hero must find passage to the Northern Wastes to aid a legendary hero named Scythe in stopping an unknown great evil from returning. Should the hero have discarded the Sword of Aeons he will have the opportunity to gain the sword "Avo's Tear", a sword of similar design and equal power but that holds a light alignment rather than dark. Avo is said to be a god that represents the light side alignment. After a series of quests revolving around this new evil, it is learned that Jack of Blades has returned. He must then defeat Jack of Blades a second time, Jack having returned from the dead in the form of a dragon. Upon the death of Jack, the hero then uses Jack's mask to trap Jack's soul, with Scythe telling him that the battle is not over and that he must destroy the mask. The hero then has the final choice of putting on the mask—being consumed by Jack in the process—or destroying it, along with Jack, forever.

== Development ==
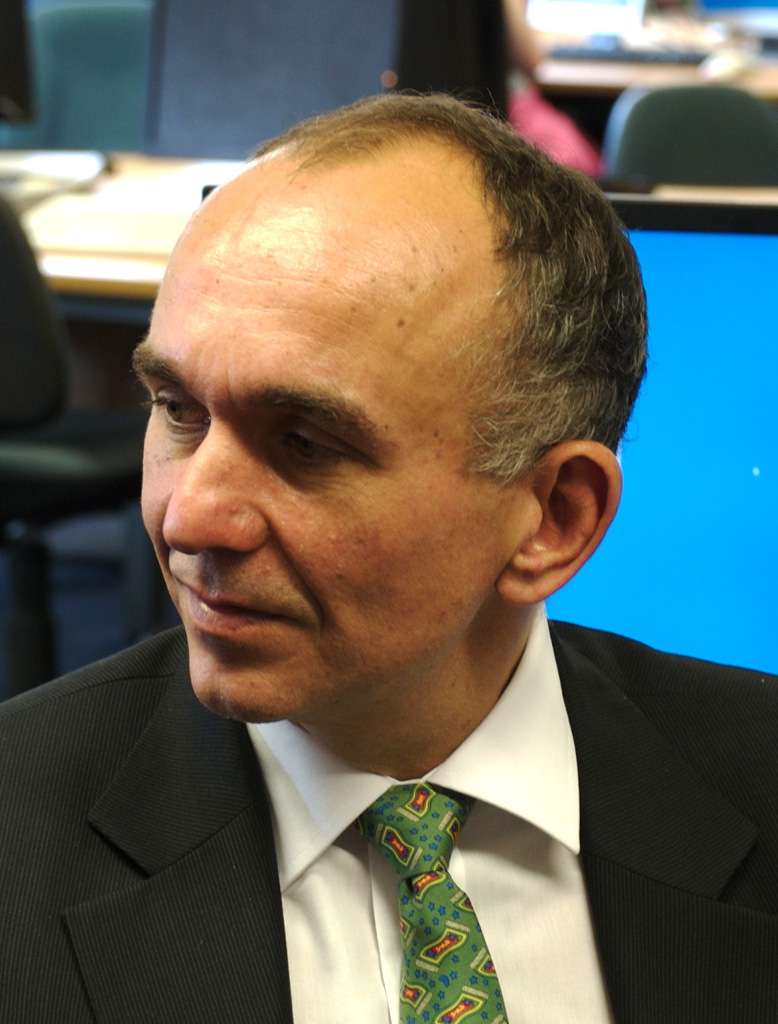
Peter Molyneux enthusiastically promoted Fable.

Fable was the first game developed by Big Blue Box, a satellite studio of Peter Molyneux's Lionhead. Dene and Simon Carter, Big Blue Box's founders, stated that their first project would have to meet several criteria in order to be accepted by game publishers, but that they weren't interested in producing a generic title. To offset the costs of running a fledgling studio, Molyneux proposed Lionhead 'satellites', where Big Blue Box would receive the technology and support of Lionhead so that Big Blue Box could focus on making the game. After some difficulty in finding a willing publisher, Big Blue Box was offered a contract by Microsoft. According to the Carters, they wanted to create a role-playing game like no other:

The world would be a breathtakingly beautiful place filled with waterfalls, mountains, dense forests, populated with compelling and convincing characters with real personality, people who actually reacted to what you did. We wanted to give the player control of a hero who would adapt to the way they played, who would age, become scarred in battle, who could get tattoos, wear dreadlocks and a dress if the player was so inclined. We wanted each and every person who played our game to have a unique experience, to have their own stories to tell. And we called it Thingy.

Early in Fable's development, the game had many titles from Wishworld to Project Ego.

The game took roughly four years to create, with a team of around 70 developers working on it. (Note: The New York Times mentioned 80 developers and development time of three years.) The main ideas that constituted the entire development of Fable were that the hero visually reflects his experience and that the world reacts in a manner appropriate to the player's actions.

Peter Molyneux aggressively promoted Fable, at one point stating that "it's gonna be the best game ever".

Fable previews noted that the somewhat absurd humour and atmosphere of the game, which GamePro called "Terry Pratchett or Piers Anthony fantasy" was far different from what was seen on contemporary RPGs.

With the exception of the title theme, Fable's music was composed by Russell Shaw, who had previously worked on Molyneux games such as Magic Carpet and Black & White. The job for composing Fable's theme music was given to Danny Elfman. Elfman noted in an interview that Hollywood composers did not typically cross over to video game work, in part because many game developers wanted a synthesised score that sounds like an orchestra, instead of the real thing. At Elfman's insistence, the developers used a small orchestra, which Shaw noted was much more of a challenge than previous projects: "There are more people involved (even without considering the orchestra), and the complexities of any music interactivity are brought to the fore."

== Release ==
Fable was expanded and re-released as Fable: The Lost Chapters for Xbox and Windows PC platforms in September 2005. The game was later ported to macOS by Robosoft Technologies and published by Feral Interactive on 31 March 2008.

The Lost Chapters features all the content found in the original Fable, as well as additional new content such as new monsters, weapons, alignment-based spells, items, armour, towns, buildings, and expressions, as well as the ability to give children objects. The story receives further augmentation in the form of nine new areas and sixteen additional quests. Characters such as Briar Rose and Scythe, who played only minor roles in the original game, are now given more importance and are included in certain main and side quests. Other character-based augmentations include the voice of the antagonist, Jack of Blades, sounding deeper, harsher and more demonic, and the ability to uncover (and resolve) the murder mystery of Lady Grey's sister. The updated edition of the game also applied fixes for certain glitches, such as the "dig glitch", in which the protagonist would move backward each time he used the shovel, pushing him through solid objects and sometimes trapping him.

=== Sales ===
Fable was a commercial success upon release, selling 375,000 copies during its first week, and 600,000 copies in the first month. Sales rose to 1.4 million copies by March 2005. By July 2006, its Xbox version had sold 1.5 million copies and earned $58 million in the United States alone. Next Generation ranked it as the 29th highest-selling game launched for the PlayStation 2, Xbox or GameCube between January 2000 and July 2006 in that country. The game has sold around three million copies worldwide.

== Reception ==
Reception

Aggregate scores
Aggregator	Score
GameRankings	Fable: 85% The Lost Chapters: PC: 83% XBOX: 83%
Metacritic	Fable: 85/100; The Lost Chapters: PC: 83/100; XBOX: 83/100; Fable Anniversary: X360: 68/100

Review scores
Publication	Score
1Up.com	X360: A
GamePro	XBOX: 4.5/5.0
GameSpot	XBOX: 8.6/10
GameSpy	XBOX: 4.0/5.0
IGN	XBOX: 9.3/10

Fable received positive reviews from both audiences and critics. The original Xbox version of the game has an aggregate critic score of 85% at both Metacritic and GameRankings. The game won more than fifty awards, and became the Xbox's fastest-selling game up to that time. During the 8th Annual Interactive Achievement Awards, the Academy of Interactive Arts & Sciences awarded Fable with outstanding achievement in "Original Musical Composition" and "Character or Story Development", as well as nominations for "Outstanding Innovation in Console Gaming" and outstanding achievement in "Game Design" and "Gameplay Engineering".

Fable's combat was praised. Staff from 1UP.com complimented the multiple approaches to combat which the publication stated made the game more a mini-game of its own: "Combat becomes its own minigame, with the goal not solely to beat a foe, but to beat it with skill and get the most from every fight. Slaughter becomes irrelevant, and the fights never become tedious."

Though pointing out several flaws in the game such as bland character designs, Marc Saltzman of USAToday.com stated that the game "should satisfy you with its incredible depth, open-ended game play, and a solid story that gets even better about half-way through the adventure". Fable has been praised for its concept of free will and having consequences for the Hero's actions. Other aspects of the game positively received included the game's tongue-in-cheek characters and what The Observer called a "very British sense of humour, in the style of Monty Python or Douglas Adams".

The short length of the main plot was criticised by reviewers, but many overlooked this due to the much larger array of side quests available to the player. One of the complaints that arose upon the release of Fable was that it failed to include features that Peter Molyneux had mentioned while the game was still in development. One of the features that were not included in the game's release was the Hero's ability to have children despite the fact that Molyneux had previously mentioned that the Hero's own children would be significant in the game. Molyneux reacted to these complaints by means of a public apology posted on the official Lionhead forums, on which he said: "If I have mentioned any feature in the past [that], for whatever reason, didn't make it as I described into Fable, I apologise." This issue was addressed in Fable II and III, both of which include the ability to have children.

The PC and Xbox versions of Fable: The Lost Chapters were also well-received, with slightly lower Metacritic and GameRankings averages than the original title. Reviewers such as Greg Kasavin of GameSpot noted that the addition of new content helped prevent the game from becoming stale. 1UP.com previewed the game and found that the additive content didn't redefine Fable, but helped bulk up the available quests, addressing the complaint of how short the original Fable was. GamePro and IGN judged The Lost Chapters on PC as surpassing its console predecessor.

In 2005, a Microsoft Game Studios representative stated that Fable would be among the franchises that would appear on the next-generation Xbox 360. Sequels Fable II and Fable III were released in 2008 and 2010, respectively.

=== Fable Anniversary ===
In addition to the migration to Unreal Engine 3, textures, lighting, and shadows were significantly improved along with longer draw distances over the original game.

Lionhead Studios announced Fable Anniversary, a remastered version of Fable: The Lost Chapters, for release on the Xbox 360 later in 2013. It features overhauled graphics and audio, a new save system and incorporates Achievements. Fable Anniversary was in full development for 15 months. The game featured graphical upgrades in many areas over the original most notably; native widescreen support, higher polygon count, larger textures, specular maps, normal maps, improved lighting, improved shadows, and a larger draw/detail distance.

It was released on Steam on 12 September 2014 and includes mod support. Upon release, it garnered mixed reviews. Many reviewers praised the new graphics, but bemoaned that old bugs from the previous version of the game had not been fixed, including freezing at a very frequent cadence. It received 68% on the review aggregation website Metacritic.
