= Black & White: Creature Isle =

- North American cover art
- Developer: Lionhead Studios
- Publishers: Electronic Arts; Feral Interactive (Mac OS X)
- Platforms: Windows PC, Macintosh
- Release: Windows: NA: 23 January 2002; EU: 8 February 2002; Mac OS X: NA: 18 December 2002
- Genres: Real-time strategy, God game
- Modes: Single player, multiplayer

Black & White: Creature Isle (known in Europe as Black & White: Creature Isles) is an expansion pack for the PC game Black & White by Lionhead Studios. It was released for Windows in January 2002 and for Mac OS X in December 2002. This expansion pack focuses on the creature and there are no levels as there were in the original game.

== Gameplay ==
The new creatures are Crocodile, Chicken, and Rhinoceros.

Tyke is given to the player early in the game. Tyke will learn from the player's creature. It will treat it as a father. It will ask for food, attention, and playtime. The player can put Tyke into a daycare, relieving the creature of his fatherly duties. But if it is kept in there for too long, the advisers will complain, and Tyke will get angry. During the trial in which the player raises Tyke, they are encouraged to teach it. The advisers will tell the player when they are ignoring Tyke. Tyke can learn miracles also, which adds more impressiveness. It will also learn and try to mimic what the creature does. It will try to have a similar personality, too. After beating the game, Tyke will turn into an AI around the isle, and whatever creature the player beats the game with will become a new tyke. So if the player beats the game as the chimp, the new Tyke will become a chimp. Players can also have an identical model creature, but different ones. (Ex. Polar bear as a tyke, brown bear as creature) The new Tyke will know all the spells and lesson of the old tyke.

Tyke's learning system is also the same as your creatures. It will learn spells if they're cast. It will watch your creatures' actions instead of yours. The creature also praises and scolds Tyke for things he dislikes. So if a player has taught the creature not to eat villagers, and tyke does so, the creature will scold it. Tyke can also be used in multiplayer and skirmish. Tyke can also interact with the creature during fights, serving as a battle aid.

Players should also note that Tyke can suffer neglect. If left in daycare, ignored, or even hurt by your creature, they may become more hateful. Tyke may not turn out how the player wants them to. They may soon ignore you, or possibly defy your creature's teachings.

== Plot ==
The story of this game involves the player controlling his or her creature (either a new one or the creature they used in Black & White) and completing missions, which are given to the player by members of a Brotherhood. The members are all creatures that are not controlled by a god, and they all wear bracelets to show their membership in this Brotherhood. Once the player completes a mission, they can then fight the creature that gave them the mission or choose to fight that creature again or use that creature at will. Once the player has successfully completed all the missions and won all the fights, they will be able to see Eve and have a baby pet for their creature. The player's pet will then have a pet, which can help both the creature and the player. Also, there is the speed miracle, though no skirmishes included in the game carry it. It can be used to get past various trials more easily. If the player does not have a creature of certain height, the creature will be enlarged. It will also automatically know the three basic spells (food, water, and wood). The default creature for newly created profiles in Creature Isle is the Ape.

== Development ==
Development of Black & White: Creature Isle began as a response to feedback on the original Black & White. The team did research on what people enjoyed the most about the first game, with fans either enjoying the creature-based gameplay, while the other enjoyed the strategy gameplay the most. They ultimately chose to focus on the creature side with Creature Isle and also wanted to do a strategy game, but chose not to do so as they wanted to focus on developing Black & White 2. There were some aspects of Black & White that didn't get into the game that they wanted to realize, and they found Creature Isle an ideal vehicle for them. Director Peter Molyneux stated that the AI was improved by working out issues found in the first game. An element that was requested in the first game and added with this one was breeding. Black & White: Creature Isle went gold on 8 January 2002.

== Reception ==
Reception

Aggregate score
Aggregator	Score
Metacritic	72/100

Review scores
Publication	Score
AllGame	4.5/5
Computer Gaming World	1.5/5
Game Informer	8.25/10
GameSpot	8/10
GameSpy	83%
GameZone	8.7/10
IGN	7.9/10
PC Gamer (UK)	80%
PC Gamer (US)	68%
X-Play	4/5

Creature Isle received "average" reviews according to video game review aggregator Metacritic.
