= BC (video game) =

B.C.
- Developer: Intrepid Computer Entertainment
- Publisher: Microsoft Game Studios
- Platform: Xbox
- Release: Cancelled
- Genre: Action-adventure
- Mode: Single-player

B.C. was an action-adventure video game in development by Intrepid Computer Entertainment, a satellite of Lionhead Studios, which was to be published by Microsoft Game Studios for the Xbox. It was cancelled in 2004 for unknown reasons. The player controls a tribe who has to evolve and migrate to become the best species in the game. Tribe members can be of different classes and each can level up different ways to evolve. The main enemies in the game are an ape-like creature called the "simians"; however, the world is also inhabited with many types of dinosaurs as well as other creatures, including the dodo.

== Features ==
The player is attacking a crocodile.

- Brutal prehistoric combat: Players experience savage battles in an uncivilized, merciless era. Heads and limbs get torn off, and pools of blood congeal after brutal conflicts in a violent, dangerous world—where only the strong survive.
- The world as a weapon: Gamers will discover and create a multitude of deadly weapons, using naturally occurring materials. Enemies can be poisoned with native plants. An avalanche can be triggered to kill predatory opponents. Interactive environments allow for multiple solutions. Any object can be picked up or used as a tool or weapon, and wild animals have the potential to be predator or prey.
- A massive prehistoric world: Players must lead their tribe through the nascent earth's deadly, but beautiful environments. From ancient rainforests to underwater settings, from scathing desert heat to fierce mountain blizzards, gamers must weather the elements.
- Deadly adversaries: The tribe becomes the hunted when deadly creatures, ranging from saber-toothed tigers to velociraptors, stalk tribe members for food or viciously defend their young when they perceive danger.
- Evolution or extinction: Players could choose which type of people to be included in their tribe. Some examples included: hunters, mystics, and fighters. Each type benefits the tribe in its own specific way.

Early images at E3 showed extreme clarity and self shading but early reviews called the artificial intelligence the most impressive game aspect. According to GameSpot.com's information on BC, the game would have had a foodchain, like Peter Jackson's King Kong: The Official Game of the Movie, in which each part would have been subject to being eaten by something higher on the foodchain. In addition, the dinosaurs and other creatures would have been intelligent, interacting with each other, thus acting independently of the player. It would have been possible to affect the game world as a whole, leading some people to comment on the driving of certain species to extinction. Other activities would have included capturing and training certain animals to use against tribal enemies.

As part of the exaggeration, in addition to anachronisms in the dinosaur age, BC would have featured dinosaurs as being larger than they really were. In one preview, Peter Molyneux was quoted as saying that the Rex seen in screenshots was a child, a third the size of its parent. The game was also planned to be very bloody. GameSpot quoted Molyneux as saying that the dinosaurs will spill "swimming pools full of blood" when killed.

According to a source, about twenty creatures were planned for the game.

== Gameplay ==
B.C. is an action-adventure game where the user controls a tribe during the early evolution era. The main goal in B.C. is to raise the tribe to become a threat and over-power the other species. In order to accomplish this, the user must populate six levels with different people from the tribe. Two types of tribe members are hunters and a chemist. Once a level is populated enough, the user takes five of their best tribe members to the next level to try to populate that area. After populating three levels, the user comes in contact with apes that are on the same evolutionary stage as the tribe members. These apes, called "Simians", do not like the tribe and attempt to kill them.

== Marketing ==
The first trailer was released on 2 February 2004.

== Music ==
According to an FAQ with IGN.com, each of B.C.'s levels had its own music which would relate with the level's atmosphere.

== Cancellation ==
Even while the game was still in production, Molyneux said that he was unsure when he could release it due to "the ambitious nature of the gameplay and the high standards the people developing it are pushing for." According to one article, as of May 2002, "[the demo build] was roughly 50 percent complete". Its cancellation was announced in late 2004 with Molyneux saying, "The decision to suspend work on any games project is always a very difficult one, particularly when it is a title with the potential of BC."
