= Fable: The Journey =

2012 video game

- Developer: Lionhead Studios
- Publisher: Microsoft Studios
- Director: Gary Carr
- Producers: Jemma Harris; Andy Barton; Phil Merricks; Craig Oman
- Designers: Mike West; Charlton Edwards
- Programmers: Tim Swann; Marcus Lynn; Ben Brooks
- Artists: Paul McLaughlin; Tak Saito; Andrew Lindsay; Jamie Galipeau
- Writer: Martin Korda
- Composer: Russell Shaw
- Series: Fable
- Engine: Unreal Engine 3
- Platform: Xbox 360
- Release: NA: 9 October 2012; AU: 9 October 2012; JP: 11 October 2012; EU: 12 October 2012
- Genre: Action role-playing
- Mode: Single-player

Fable: The Journey is a 2012 on-rails action role-playing video game and the fifth game in the Fable series. It was developed by Lionhead Studios and published by Microsoft Studios for Xbox 360 as a Kinect title. First announced at E3 2011, the game is a standalone title, separate from the main series. Unlike previous games, Fable: The Journey was developed using Unreal Engine 3. It is the last game by Lionhead Studios before the studio's closure in 2016.

== Gameplay ==
Fable: The Journey is an on-rails action role-playing video game played from a first-person perspective that has players use Kinect to manipulate magic in order to defeat enemies. By using their hands to perform certain gestures, players can cast a variety of spells, ranging from electric bolts to magic shards. As enemies are defeated, experience is collected which the player can use to upgrade health and spells.

A large portion of the game takes place with the player character's horse. Driving the horse requires "holding" the reins and guiding the horse along a path. The player must also care for their horse by petting and brushing it as well as caring for it when it gets hurt.

There is also cross-game interaction with Fable Heroes. Playing Fable Heroes will level up the character in Fable: The Journey as well as unlock additional items.

== Plot ==
=== Setting ===
Fable: The Journey takes place on the fictional continent of Albion, 50 years after the events of Fable III, following the attack by the Crawler that nearly plunged the kingdom of Bowerstone into darkness. The player assumes the role of a Dweller named Gabriel, who is travelling with his tribe to their summer camp for that year, with his own carriage and a sturdy work horse named Seren, a lifelong companion. The game's "on-rail" mechanics sees players traveling on a linear path through forests, mountain passes, haunted swamps, and rugged terrain; both the city of Bowerstone and the Spire from previous games return, the latter serving as the endpoint in the story.

=== Synopsis ===
Gabriel, a young Dweller, falls behind on his journey to the Dweller's summer camp, forcing his friend Katlan to help him catch up. While dozing off near a coastline road, a violent storm from the Spire, a towering Old Kingdom structure rebuilt one hundred years ago, reaches him and cuts him off from the rest of his kind. Instructed by Katlan to take a detour to reunite with them, Gabriel's new route leads him to encountering the blind seer Theresa, who was ejected from the Spire by a powerful force known as the Corrupter, and who finds herself wounded while under attack by the Devourer, a lieutenant of the Corrupter. Rescuing her, Gabriel discovers Seren was infected by the Devourer, and is directed to a temple belonging to a long-forgotten people called the Enlightened, which houses the power he can use to heal his horse.

At the temple, Theresa reveals how the Corrupter was a former Hero from the Old Kingdom, who was corrupted by the Void, who initially kept back the powers of darkness, until they were lost to the corruption, prompting three Heroes to defeat him and seal away the Corruption with Spire after it was first built. Upon acquiring the power needed to heal Seren in the form of magic gauntlets similar to the ones Albion's late Hero monarch used, Gabriel cures his horse, but finds the gauntlets can't be removed from his hands. Theresa reveals he can remove them, if he helps her secure a collection of three Willstones, each for a hero of the Old Kingdom devoted to one of the Hero values – Strength, Skill, and Will. Gabriel reluctantly agrees, and searches for the Willstones, hidden within three Enlightened temples across Albion. Upon finding the first one, Gabriel is forced to defeat the devourer with the aid of a woodsman, whose sacrifice inspires him to fight for Albion's future.

While on their journey to the next two temples, Theresa admits to Gabriel how the Corrupter's return is her fault – a hundred years ago, the seer had influenced the reconstruction of the Spire, hoping to take control of it and use its power to wish away all evil in the world. However, she failed to realize that the restoration of the Spire allowed the Corrupter to use it as a conduit to begin his return to Albion; Theresa discovered this fifty years later after the Crawler, an agent of the Corrupter, devasted the overseas kingdom of Aurora, hence her involvement in getting Albion's Hero Monarch to stop it. Despite the attempts of the Corrupter and another agent of his, the Temptress, to prevent their mission, Gabriel secures the remaining Willstones, and follows Theresa's directions for the coastline of Kraken's Jaw, which houses a Cullis Gate that can bring them back to the Spire.

During this leg of the journey, Gabriel is reunited with Katlan, who was mortally wounded defending the Dwellers from a balverine attack. Before dying, Katlan recognises Gabriel as a Hero who he suspects Albion needed. Buoyed by his friend's words, Gabriel reaches Kraken's Jaw, only to learn Theresa has enough power to reactivate the Cullis Gate for the two of them, forcing Gabriel to bid Seren farewell, and travels with her to the Spire. Once in the towering structure, Theresa instructs him to channel his power and the Willstones through her. In doing so, Theresa sacrifices herself in order to invoke a final wish that eliminates the Corrupter and saves Albion. Gabriel manages to escape from the Spire before it is destroyed as a result of the wish, returning to Kraken's Jaw. The game ends with Gabriel seeing Theresa's blindfold on the ground and picking it up, the camera revealing he is now blind and likely Theresa's successor.

== Reception ==
Reception

Aggregate score
Aggregator	Score
Metacritic	61/100

Review scores
Publication	Score
Destructoid	3.5/10
Electronic Gaming Monthly	9/10
G4	2.5/5
Game Informer	5/10
GameSpot	8/10
GamesRadar+	2.5/5
Giant Bomb	3/5
Hardcore Gamer	4/5
IGN	7.2/10
Official Xbox Magazine (US)	6.5/10
The Escapist	2/5

Fable: The Journey received a range of mixed reviews. It received an aggregated score of 61/100 on Metacritic.

Giant Bomb praised the game's characters, humor and emotional depth: "You end up genuinely feeling sorry for certain characters on several occasions when bad things happen to them, and the game culminates in a moment that will likely be among the most poignant seen in a game this year".

The strongest criticisms of the game came from Destructoid, which said: "...altogether it's evident that Lionhead worked hard on this latest Fable adventure. That does not mean, however, that it's good. Far from it. As much as Lionhead may have tried its level best, the limitations of Kinect ensure, at every step, that The Journey is boring when it works and tear-inducing when it doesn't".
