= Fable (video game series) =

Video game series

- Genre: Action role-playing
- Developers: Big Blue Box (2004); Lionhead Studios (2005–2016); Flaming Fowl Studios (2017–2020); Playground Games (2020–present)
- Publisher: Xbox Game Studios
- Composers: Danny Elfman; Russell Shaw
- Platforms: Xbox; Microsoft Windows; macOS; Xbox 360; Xbox One; Xbox Series X/S; PlayStation 5
- First release: Fable; 14 September 2004
- Latest release: Fable Fortune; 22 February 2018

Fable is a fantasy action role-playing game series originally created by Lionhead Studios and later developed by Playground Games. The franchise is owned and published by Xbox Game Studios. Set in the fictional land of Albion, the series emphasizes player choice, morality systems, and a satirical, fairy-tale inspired take on British folklore. The main series follows different heroes across several centuries of Albion's history, with each installment depicting a more technologically advanced era, ranging from a medieval-inspired society to an industrialized nation. In addition to combat and quests, the games allow players to engage in life simulation activities such as property ownership, romance, family life, trading, and social interaction.

The franchise began with Fable (2004) for the original Xbox, followed by Fable II (2008) and Fable III (2010). After a period of dormancy which included the closure of Lionhead Studios in 2016, the franchise was revived by Playground Games, which announced a reboot of the franchise in 2020. A new Fable title is scheduled for release in 2027 as part of the franchise's reboot. Beyond the main entries, the series has expanded into spin-offs games, a collectible card game and a novel, as well as various promotional and crossover projects.

== Setting ==
The Fable series takes place in the fictional nation of Albion, a state that, at the time of the first game, is composed of numerous autonomous city-states with vast areas of countryside or wilderness in between. The setting originally resembles Medieval Britain, with some European elements. The name Albion itself is an ancient albeit still used name for Great Britain. The period of time progresses with each game; in Fable II, Albion has advanced to an era similar to that of the Age of Enlightenment, and by Fable III the nation has been unified under a monarchy and is undergoing an "Age of Industry" similar to the real-world 18th-19th-century Industrial Revolution.

In the first Fable, players assume the role of a boy who is forced into a life of heroism when bandits attack his village, kill his father and kidnap his sister. The choices players make in the game affect the perception and reaction to their Hero by the characters of Albion and change the Hero's appearance to mirror what good or evil deeds he has performed. In addition to the main quest to learn what happened to the Hero's family, players can engage in optional quests and pursuits such as trading, romance and married life, pub gaming, boxing, exploring, and theft.

Fable II takes place 500 years after the events of the first game. The world resembles Europe between the late 1600s and early 1700s, the time of highwaymen and the Enlightenment. Science and more modern ideas have suppressed the religion and magic of old Albion. Its towns have developed into cities, weaponry is slowly taking advantage of gunpowder, and social, family and economic life present more possibilities as well as challenges. The sequel expands most or all parts of the gaming experience from the previous game, without changing the elementary modes of playing. The continent of Albion is larger as a game world, but contains fewer locations, and the locations that remain are more developed and detailed. In contrast to Fable, the solving of set quests is not the basis of the story; rather, the story develops from the player's situation in time and place. This gives the game a sense of more interactivity than the first title in the series.

In Fable III the setting is 50 years after that of Fable II. The historical development is further advanced since the last version: Albion is experiencing an Industrial Revolution and society resembles that of the early 1800s. In all of the versions, the moral development (in a negative or a positive way) is at the core of the gameplay. This moral development is expanded to include the personal or psychological and has a more political aspect, as the goal of the game is to overthrow the oppressive king of Albion, as well as defend the continent from attacks from abroad.

== Gameplay ==
As role-playing video games, the Fable series constructs the development of a protagonist controlled by the player, and the development is related to the same character's interaction with the game world. A major part of this interaction is for the Fable series related to interaction with people, be it conversation, storytelling, education, trading, gaming, courting and relationships, or fighting. The player is able to develop the protagonist following several parameters, such as magic, strength and social skills. The player may also direct the moral quality of the protagonist, so that skills may be developed in equal terms and conditions both in the negative and positive field. In addition to this basis of the gameplay, some of the versions focus on set quests that together give the protagonist the opportunity to develop, as well as unveiling strands of the story of the game. Fable II and Fable III include cooperative gameplay, where two players with their own character can join forces in their different tasks.

== History ==
Release timeline Main series in bold
2004	**Fable**
2005	Fable: The Lost Chapters
2006
2007
2008	**Fable II**
2008	Fable II Pub Games
2009
2010	**Fable III**
2011	Fable Coin Golf
2012	Fable Heroes
2012	Fable: The Journey
2013
2014	Fable Anniversary
2015
2016	Fable Legends
2017	Fable Fortune
2018
2019
2020
2021
2022
2023
2024
2025
2026
2027	**Fable**

Aggregate review scores As of 6 July 2014.
Game	Metacritic
Fable	(Xbox) 85 (PC) 83 (X360) 68
Fable II Pub Games	(X360) 53
Fable II	(X360) 89
Fable III	(X360) 80 (PC) 75
Fable Heroes	(X360) 55
Fable: The Journey	(X360) 61

=== Fable (2001–2006) ===
The first game, Fable, was teased in 2001 by developer Lionhead Studios. Lead designer and Lionhead co-founder Peter Molyneux "promised an experience like no other" and that the game would "revolutionize the RPG". Fable was released for Xbox on 14 September 2004. It was originally seen very poorly as it was mostly reported that the game had no content due to the substantial amount of unfulfilled "promises" by Molyneux, which he soon apologized for, garnering even more press coverage.

Despite offers from such large companies, such as Electronic Arts, the over-ambition experienced during Fable's development and overestimated sales of the original game had left Lionhead Studios with low stocks and in debt. To gain access to a bigger budget Lionhead signed with Microsoft Game Studios. An extended version, Fable: The Lost Chapters, was released for Windows and Xbox in September 2005; Feral Interactive ported the game to the Mac platform on 31 March 2008. It featured new content in many forms and, with the support of Microsoft, was a critical and commercial success.

=== Fable II and Fable III (2006–2012) ===
Fable II was released for Xbox 360 on 24 October 2008. It was also a critical and commercial success. It featured a tie-in game called Fable II Pub Games that was released on the Xbox Live Arcade, and an interactive online flash game called Fable: A Hero's Tale that allowed players to open a secret chest in the main game. A third game, Fable III, was released for Xbox 360 on 29 October 2010, and a Microsoft Windows release on 17 March 2011. This game also featured a tie-in phone game called Fable Coin Golf. On 2 May 2012, Fable Heroes, was released for the Xbox Live Arcade. Despite the amount of differences the game has from others in the series and its mixed critical reception, it being a multiplayer-based family-friendly beat-em-up, the game is popular among fans as it still embodies some of fans' favorite iconic elements of the series.

=== Decline (2012–2020) ===
Fable: The Journey, a spin-off within the series, was released in October 2012 in North America and Europe. The game utilized the Kinect attachment for the Xbox 360. Lead designer Peter Molyneux departed Lionhead Studios in 2012. Lionhead Studios released an Xbox 360 remake of the original game, including The Lost Chapters, called Fable Anniversary to mixed reviews in February 2014. Fable Trilogy, a compilation for Xbox 360 that includes Fable Anniversary, Fable II and Fable III was released in February 2014. Fable-themed card games were released as part of the Microsoft Solitaire Collection for the PC on March 4, 2014 and a Fable Anniversary theme was released for the Microsoft Jigsaw collection.

In August 2013, Lionhead Studios released a teaser trailer for Fable Legends, an Xbox One title set during the "Age of Heroes" long before the events of the first game. The trailer emphasizes that in the game the player would play alongside four other players and may choose to be the Hero of the story or the Villain. Microsoft canceled the project in March 2016 and Lionhead Studios was closed soon afterwards. In May 2016, former Lionhead developers launched a Kickstarter campaign to crowdfund Fable Fortune, a free-to-play collectible card game. The game was previously in development at Lionhead prior to the studio's closure. The game was released for the Xbox One in February 2018.

=== Reboot (2020–present) ===
In January 2018, rumors surfaced that a new Fable game was being developed by Playground Games, and that studio was hiring 177 positions for an open world role-playing game. During the Xbox Games Showcase in July 2020, a new Fable was announced as being in development, with the game releasing on the Xbox Series X and Series S and Microsoft Windows at an undisclosed date. It will run on the Forza series' in-house game engine, ForzaTech. In November 2021, Eidos-Montréal would join the project as a co-developer. By March 2023, the game was reported to be in the early stages of full production. On June 11, 2023, Playground Games unveiled the first in-game trailer of Fable at the Xbox Games Showcase, featuring actor Richard Ayoade, subsequently followed by another July 2024 trailer featuring actor Matt King.

The game was originally planned for release in 2025. However, on February 25, 2025, Craig Duncan, head of Xbox Game Studios, announced on the Xbox Podcast that the launch had been moved to 2026 to improve overall quality and address technical issues. Shortly after the announcement, rumors surfaced suggesting that the delay was intended to allow the game to launch simultaneously on PlayStation 5; however, these claims were denied by Microsoft insiders.

On January 8, 2026, Xbox announced that the game would receive a deep-dive presentation at Xbox Developer Direct on January 23, 2026. During the event, Playground Games confirmed that the game will be released simultaneously on PlayStation 5, Xbox Series X/S, and Microsoft Windows in Autumn 2026, marking this game to be the first Fable title to release on a non-Xbox home console as well as on a PlayStation console. However, on May 29, 2026, Playground Games and Microsoft announced that Fable was delayed to February 2027 in order to "have the dedicated moment it deserves" as the publisher planned its holiday lineup. With a follow up trailer coming out during the Xbox Showcase on the 7th June 2026, with the new release date being the 23rd February 2027, along with confirming Hayley Atwell is starring in the game.

== Novel ==
Novel cover art

Fable: The Balverine Order is a fantasy novel by Peter David based on the series. The novel was released in North America and Europe in October 2010. The book was released with an exclusive code to unlock a unique weapon in Fable III. The story is told from the point of view of a king of an unknown country who listens to an unnamed story-teller in the Fable universe. It takes place between Fable II and III. The central story involves the characters Thomas Kirkman, a wealthy son of a textile merchant whose mother's death puts him on his quest to find a balverine, and his manservant, James Skelton, a child in a large poor family. The two friends brave the wilds in search of a balverine that killed Thomas' brother, Stephen.
