= Fable II =

2008 video game

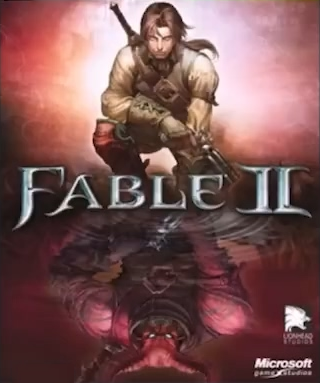
- Developer: Lionhead Studios
- Publisher: Microsoft Game Studios
- Designer: Peter Molyneux
- Composers: Danny Elfman; Russell Shaw
- Series: Fable
- Platform: Xbox 360
- Release: NA: 21 October 2008; AU: 23 October 2008; EU: 24 October 2008
- Genre: Action role-playing
- Modes: Single-player, multiplayer

Fable II is a 2008 action role-playing video game developed by Lionhead Studios and published by Microsoft Game Studios for Xbox 360. The game is the second installment in the Fable game series, and the sequel to 2004's Fable. The story takes place within the fictional land of Albion, 500 years after the first game. Players assume the role of a young hero who is destined to stop a former ruler turned madman from destroying the world. The game features several prominent actors portraying major characters in the game, including Zoë Wanamaker, Ron Glass and Stephen Fry. The game's setting takes inspiration from the historical late colonial era, in terms of architecture, social equality and basic firearms such as flintlock pistols.

The game made several improvements over its predecessor, updating existing gameplay and offering larger locations to explore. Alongside the main story, players can engage in several side quests and repeatable jobs to earn money and rewards, build up a property empire, and customise their character with various clothing items, hairstyles, tattoos and makeup. Players also can make decisions on how they act, affecting their characters' morality and appearance as a result. New features to the game included the opportunity to choose between playing as a male or female character, a fast-travel system, and a canine companion who can detect treasures and alert the player to nearby enemies.

Fable II was released in October 2008 and achieved critical acclaim, many citing its adherence to the original while praising the changes that redefined the game system. The game later received two downloadable content packs – which introduced new locations, items and quests – which were released in a compilation with the main game, titled Fable II: Game of the Year, in September 2009. It has been cited as one of the greatest video games of all time, and proved a commercial success, becoming the best selling title on Xbox 360 following its release. A sequel, Fable III, was released in 2010.

== Gameplay ==
The world in Fable II is fully dynamic, interactive and mostly free roaming with no set quest path to take. Since the game takes place over a hero's lifetime, many things can change; Molyneux gave an example of a trade camp that the player could either help or destroy. Trading in such camps would increase their profit, resulting in a small town growing around them.

Additionally, every accessible property (those that can be entered by the player) in the world can be purchased (except for the Tattered Spire), and ownership of unique buildings can unlock further quests. In addition to purchasing and renting homes, businesses and stalls are now available for purchase. These businesses produce income for the player every 5 minutes, depending on the quality of the business, the economy level of the town, and the opinion of the shop owner for the player (a shopkeeper with a high opinion will work harder), and the rent or goods prices set by the player; this happens even while the Xbox 360 is turned off. Rent is also accumulated every 5 minutes. Also, if the player visits his own shops, the quality of their goods will improve, and improve the quality of the shop. Players are able to furnish the houses with furniture and other items available for sale. In addition, titles will be awarded for buying property; if one were to buy every building and piece of land in a town he/she may become the mayor of that town; owning more land leads to higher titles such as king/queen, and eventually Emperor of the entire land of Albion. Players can become more Pure by setting prices and rent low, or more Corrupt by increasing them.

The environment in Fable II features trees with branches and leaves that are individually animated according to their own physics, each tree having roughly 120,000 leaves. There are also around 15 million poppies in Albion. There are both interactive and non-interactive cutscenes in the game. According to Lionhead Studios, the non-interactive cutscenes consume less than five minutes of game time.

In the fully interactive cutscenes a player can use their expressions during the dialogue or even run away from the scene, thus skipping it; afterward the player can return to the cutscene location to start it again. If the player runs away from a cutscene which contains important information, the character will await the player's return.

The player's companion is a dog which the player befriends as a child. This dog follows the player almost all of the time during the game. The dog can learn tricks, fight enemies and find treasure, and lead the way to quest objectives (when required, though this is rare; typically the player is led to objectives via a sparkling gold "bread crumb" trail). It can also aid in combat situations by attacking downed enemies. The dog cannot be killed, but can become injured and ineffective, requiring healing by the player.

The appearance of their dog will also mirror the player's choices and changes colour depending on the player's alignments; if the player is neutral it will remain grey, being good will turn the dog's coat to golden and evil will turn it to black. There are no other animals in the game, save for neutral rabbits and birds, a fact commented on by one NPC who notices the oddness of carriages with no horses.

In the downloadable content "See the Future", it is possible to change the dog's breed with potions. The three choices are Dalmatian, Bloodhound and Husky.

=== Family and relationships ===
In Fable II, it is possible for the player's character to get married, including same-sex marriage, and have children. Divorce with the player's spouse can occur, and can be initiated by either the spouse or the player themselves. As with a real family, time spent around and interacting with them will keep the bond between them strong and reduce the chance of them leaving. It is possible to become widowed through the death of a partner. It is also possible for the player character's children to die through cot death or disease, or to run away from home to become an adventurer, in which case the player can rescue them from danger.

The relationships, as in the original Fable, are initiated by flirting, gift-giving, and the common expression. By performing a potential mate's favourite expressions, or giving them their preferred gifts, they will become infatuated more easily. Beyond a certain level of interest, or payment in the case of prostitute characters, a character may proposition the player for sex. Unprotected sex may lead to the birth of a child, but can also lead to sexually transmitted disease; this does affect the player, as it may lead to sterilisation. If the player has purchased or found a condom, they will have the option of protected sex. No sex is actually shown; the screen is black when the option is selected.

=== Character morphing ===
Fable II enhances the system of morphing one's character based on their actions as introduced in Fable. Character morphing revolves around two major alignment scales: Good and Evil, and Purity and Corruption.

Good players will enable a pleasant-looking Hero, with tanned skin and light hair, while evil players will have a more frightening look, with pale skin and black hair. Pure players will find that their hero will have a clear complexion and a halo, while corrupt players will find their hero with a flawed complexion and horns. These scales are independent of one another, meaning that it is possible to be both good and corrupt simultaneously or any other variation.

Also related to character morphing is the character's slimness or fatness, determined by what foods the player eats; fruits and vegetables (mainly celery), make the player thinner, while alcohol, meat and pies make the player fatter. In addition, fruits and vegetables give the player purity points (because no animals are harmed in their creation/consumption), while meats and alcohol give the player corruption points (because animals were harmed in their creation/consumption and they can cause drunkenness, respectively). This has no effect on gameplay other than attractiveness or the lack thereof in the eyes of NPCs.

Levelling up stats will also alter the player character's appearance. Increasing the Physique level will make the Hero more muscular. Increasing the Skill stat will make the Hero taller. A high level of Will power and spells create glowing blue markings, called Will Lines, all over the body.

=== Jobs ===
Unlike Fable, the player does not acquire money through doing quests, but by doing jobs around Albion. These are Blacksmith, Woodcutter, Bartender, Assassin, Civilian Displacement (Slaver), Bounty Hunter, and Merchant. The first three involve correctly pressing the A button during certain times, and the latter three are combat related. Merchant, however, is done by taking advantage of the economies of each town, buying low and selling to richer vendors for a profit. The jobs become available depending on how much renown the player has and story progression. The trade skill jobs can be done over and over again for a certain number of days, but the side quest jobs are single use, requiring the player to wait for another task to become available. The trade skills can be levelled up to five stars via promotions, allowing for more money to be made.

=== Recreation ===
Exploration plays a primary role in the game. As in the original Fable, gameplay is very linear; however, main story-advancing missions may be performed whenever the player chooses and there are additional missions that do not affect the storyline. The player may also choose to perform any of the many different jobs, gambling-based mini-games, participating in the arena-style minigame called the Crucible, explore dungeons, tombs, and caves, or roam the countryside. The player may even choose to kill innocents in town. All of these optional diversions can result in rewards for the player in the form of additional wealth, items, experience points, or character-altering attributes. Exploration is essential to discovering much of the game's hidden content, in the form of 50 silver keys, special treasure chests, 9 Demon Doors, and 50 gargoyles that can be destroyed.

=== Co-operative play ===
Players are able to drop in and out of other players' games at will. The host player can set certain rules; e.g. how loot gained is split between the players and if friendly fire is active. The joining player cannot load their custom hero; they must select a premade male or female character. This "henchman" cannot buy property or gamble in their friend's world, nor can he/she accept quests. Co-op can be achieved through Xbox Live, System Link, and by playing on a single console.

Fable II did not ship with online cooperative, but a free patch has been available from Xbox Live since the European and American release date which adds this functionality. Without the patch, players cannot play online due to being disconnected from Xbox Live.

At E3 2008 in July lead designer Peter Molyneux demonstrated 'Albion Orbs'. These orbs show where other players are in their worlds and allows bringing them into their world to co-op with. Only orbs for friends are initially viewable, with all players viewable if an in-game setting is changed. Online chat is automatically enabled between players that can see each other's orbs.

While on the same console, a second player with their own account can drop in and out as a "henchman" to the first player. If the second player on the same console does not have an account of their own, the henchman is made in a brief character-creation screen that pauses the game. Henchmen created this way are not saved into the main player's game. The first player also decides how much bounty the henchman will obtain, e.g. gold and experience. The second player is also able to port any experience, renown and gold to their own Fable II Hero via a memory card if they have imported their character and not created the henchman from scratch. Also, it is possible to use a profile on the Xbox 360 itself to create a henchman, the earned gold and experience being transferred there.

== Synopsis ==
=== Setting ===
Fable II takes place within the fictional land of Albion - a large continent consisting of several settlements, the largest being the city of Bowerstone, surrounded by lawless stretches of land, including forests, marshlands, and coastal roads. The story and events take place 500 years after the first game, in which the relative safety and peace brought about by the defeat of Jack of Blades led to Albion's citizens deeming heroes to be corrupt and no longer being needed, effectively leading to many to disappear and the Heroes' Guild being destroyed in a riot. Since then, the land has seen changes to science and philosophy, with new religions replacing the old ones of medieval Albion, and new technologies being developed, including the creation of firearms. In effect, Albion has now evolved into a society resembling that of Earth during the late colonial and early modern period.

The game's story provides further background upon the "Old Kingdom" which existed centuries ago, but was destroyed following the activation of a large structure constructed by its inhabitants to magically grant a single wish to its user. The player's character (nicknamed by default as Sparrow) is a descendant of a hero from a bloodline traced back to the Old Kingdom, and takes place over three separate time periods (much like the first game): childhood, which acts as a prologue and training section of the game; young adulthood; and adulthood.

=== Plot ===
During a cold winter in Bowerstone, a young child known as Sparrow lives in poverty within the city's poorer district alongside their older sister Rose. Both dream of one day living in Castle Fairfax, the home of Lord Lucien that towers over the city. One day, the pair witness a travelling seller offering 'magical' wares to people, amongst them a musical box that can grant anyone who uses it a wish. An old woman convinces the pair to acquire the money needed to buy it by doing odd jobs around the district, during which time Sparrow rescues a dog from a local bully. Upon buying the box, Rose uses it to make their dream to come true. That evening, guards arrive to bring the pair to the castle, who are overjoyed that their wish comes true. However, the pair soon discover that Lucien brought them to his home to determine which of them were the three "Heroes" he seeks to fulfil his ambitions. Discovering that one of the pair is the fourth Hero who will stop him, Lucien kills Rose and wounds Sparrow, sending them out onto the city streets.

The old woman soon finds Sparrow with the help of the dog they rescued, and takes them away from the city to recover. Ten years later, now that Sparrow is a young adult, the old woman instructs them to enter a cave system beneath a large lake, which houses the ruins of what was left of the Heroes' Guild. Once inside, the old woman introduces herself as Theresa, a blind seeress, who explains that Sparrow is a descendant of the Hero of Oakvale who defeated Jack of Blades. After they prove themselves by defeating a prominent bandit leader in the region, Theresa reveals that they are the only ones who can stop Lucien from destroying the world with an ancient structure known as The Spire - a building that channel magical energy to grant its user any wish they desire. Theresa reveals that Sparrow is destined to defeat Lucien by finding the three heroes he seeks, each defining a specific parameter – strength, will, and skill.

Sparrow begins with finding the hero of strength from the village of Oakfield. Discovering them to be a female monk known as Sister Hannah, they work to prove themselves to her father the local abbot, before providing her with protection as she undertakes an important ritual. However, Lucien sends men to find her, who kill her father when he refuses to let them to take her. Angered, Hannah kills his murderer before offering her help to Sparrow, renaming herself as Hammer. With her help, Sparrow proceeds with tracking down the hero of will - a scholar known as Garth, who worked with Lucien to rebuild the Spire, but fell out with him over time. Lucien kidnaps him before he can be recruited, and Theresa reveals that he was taken to the Spire as a prisoner. Sparrow and Hammer head to Westcliff where Lucien is recruiting new guards from competitors that survive several harsh rounds at a local arena. Successfully winning a place amongst the latest recruits, Sparrow leaves their possessions and dog with Hammer and travels to the Spire to find Garth.

Made a slave in their new role, Sparrow endures ten years of servitude, making a number of tough decisions in the process. Eventually, Garth creates an opportunity for the pair to escape from the Spire and return to the mainland, where he agrees to help in the battle against Lucien. Hammer soon reveals that during Sparrow's absence, she sought out information on the hero of skill, discovering it to be the pirate lord known as Reaver – a skilled marksman who rules over the pirate town of Bloodstone in the south. With Garth's help, Sparrow uses a cullis gate - a teleportation system used by the Heroes' Guild - to reach the marshlands that border Bloodstone, dealing with the undead in the process. After impressing Reaver with their fame, Sparrow undertakes a request from him, only for him to attempt to betray them to Lucien to claim the bounty on them. However, Reaver is soon double-crossed himself, and finds himself forced to help Sparrow and the other heroes in order to survive.

With the three Heroes found, Theresa reveals that all of them need to channel their energy in a ritual to acquire a weapon needed to defeat Lucien. However, the seeress soon goes missing after the ritual is completed, whereupon Lucien arrives and kills Sparrow and their dog before kidnapping the others. Rather than die, Sparrow is taken to a dream-like paradise to reside within as a child, with Rose alive and well. Although the location is peaceful, Sparrow hears the music box playing and seeks it out, against Rose's advice, fighting against the ensuing nightmares to locate it. Upon touching it, Rose reveals it was a test, allowing him to use its power. Finding themselves back in the Spire, Sparrow tracks down Lucien and uses the music box to defeat him, whereupon he dies at their hands or Reaver's.

Theresa soon offers Sparrow a wish from the Spire that they can have as a reward: resurrecting the thousands of people that died building the Spire, and thus becoming a true hero in Albion; resurrecting their sister Rose, their dog, and, if they had one, their spouse and family; or being granted an immense fortune. After making their wish, Theresa then offers to send the others where they wish to go - Garth opts to return to his homeland, with Reaver deciding to join him, while Hammer decides to head north to find some monks to help her avoid further violence. After they leave, Theresa leaves Sparrow to enjoy Albion, but proclaims that the Spire is now hers to own. If the player has downloaded the See the Future pack, Theresa allows them to visit after cleansing two cursed items, to see a glimpse of their future. In this vision they now rule over Albion as monarch, and it is hinted that a child of theirs will become a hero to save Albion after their death, setting the background for Fable III.

== Marketing ==
=== Tales of Albion ===
Lionhead Studios released a section on their website entitled "Tales of Albion", which provides a back-story to Fable, Fable: The Lost Chapters, and Fable II. In "Fragments of the Old Kingdom", it details how the Archon came to power in Albion, and how the Heroes' Guild was founded. "Tales" also chronicles the end of the Heroes and ruin of their Guild in "Fall of the Heroes", and "Travels in Today's Albion" (which has been completed since its release) describes where some places are and has a little description of each notable area/artefact.

=== Online competitions ===
Just as Lionhead has done with The Movies, online competitions were made available through Lionhead's forums. One such competition was naming a title to be used in the game, similar to the first game wherein a character was addressed by various titles that the character purchased from a "Title Vendor". Lionhead has stated these titles would be bought but they have to be earned first. They are bought from a town crier in Fable II; the winning title was Lionheart, which can be bought for 2000 gold or earned for free by winning in The Crucible. An "insult the hero" competition also took place and the winner was not announced. On 30 May, Lionhead held a competition for artwork that would be used in the game; there has been no winner announced to date.

=== Video diaries ===
2007:

- 24 May, episode one of The Lionhead Diaries, examining the love and emotion aspect of Fable II was released.
- 30 July, episode two was released, highlighting the one button in the combat system, and featured the Lionhead staff playing a game of football against fellow Microsoft satellite Rare and winning. It also included a professional combat specialist instructing the animation staff.
- 8 October, episode three was released, going in depth about the Central Technology Group, and featured Lionhead's 10-year Anniversary.

2008:

- 11 January, episode four was released, focusing on how the graphics department made the world of Albion.
- 19 March, episode five was released, looking at magic, GDC 2008 and co-op.
- 22 June, episode six "Art and the Hero" was released, looking at the artwork of the Hero, Albion, and many different characters in Fable II.
- 2 October, episode seven "Music and Audio" was released, showing how and where the main scores were made, where the voice-overs were recorded and taking a brief glimpse at the various voice talents for the game.

2009:

- 8 January, episode eight "Finishing Fable II & Creating Knothole Island" was released, detailing the Lionhead Team's euphoria over having finally completed Fable II, and giving a brief look at how Knothole Island was made, and why it did not ship out in December 2008.
- In May, episode nine "See the Future" came.

=== Fable II Pub Games ===
In August 2008, Lionhead Studios released Fable II Pub Games. This includes three of the games that can be played in pubs throughout Albion: Fortune's Tower, Keystone and Spinner Box. For 800 Microsoft Points all three games could be downloaded on the Xbox Live Marketplace.

Alternatively, some video game retailers offered a product code when a pre-order for Fable II was made.

=== Limited edition ===
Before the game was released, there was a production problem resulting in the Hobbe figurine, special box, and fate cards being removed from the collector's edition package. Due to the loss of these items, the suggested retail price was decreased to the normal game price in some stores. As an apology, Lionhead Studios created a free music album available for download over the Internet (not Xbox Live) that contains several songs from Fable and three songs from Fable II, as well as printable pdf versions of the fate cards to be released. There was another supply chain issue that occurred in North America that caused some Limited Edition games not to have the token card for in-game content.

A Limited Edition was available on its release date with the following extra features:

- Alternative packaging including cardboard slip cover
- 1 token card code for in-game content (downloaded over Xbox Live)
- Bonus disc containing the "Making of Fable II"

There was also a 2nd European release of the Limited Edition game which featured the extra features minus the token card code for downloadable content.

== Downloadable content ==
The first downloadable content (DLC), "Knothole Island", includes the ability to resurrect the player's dog by sacrifice. It was released 13 January 2009, and features a new map, with new items and quests. The DLC includes 3 new achievements worth 100 points. A free update allows players who have not purchased "Knothole Island" to still play online with others who did. "Knothole Island" was available for 800 Microsoft Points. The DLC got positive to average reviews. It holds a score of 66/100 on Metacritic. Dan Whitehead of Eurogamer awarded it a score of 6/10 while Tom Orry of VideoGamer.com awarded it a score of 7/10 saying that "Knothole Island is a good effort but far from the standard the full game set".

The second DLC, "See the Future", includes the ability to change the player's dog's breed. It was released 12 May 2009. The DLC includes a quest based around three cursed items from Murgo the Trader. In addition to these new quests and items, one new area is included and players have the ability to change the breed of their dog as well as the ability to get their dog back if players chose not to resurrect their dog at the end of the main storyline. The DLC includes 13 new achievements worth 250 points. It was available for 560 Microsoft Points. The DLC was met with positive criticism: "[See The Future] should be an essential purchase for Fable fans. It doesn't change things enough to win over anyone who didn't enjoy the main game, but as an expansion it extends the game in ways that are certainly worth experiencing".

As of September 2009, the entire Fable II game was available for download through Microsoft's Xbox Live Game Marketplace. When first released, the downloadable version of the game was broken up into 5 game episodes that play identical to the disc version of the game, and the first episode of the game was free to download, while Episodes 2, 3, 4, and 5 could be purchased within the game. Any player who purchased the disc version after the first episode can transfer all save data. Currently, only the entire game can be purchased, and Episode 1 is no longer available as a demo. The downloadable version featured the complete version of the disc-based game, as well as full compatibility with the previously released game add-ons, "Knothole Island" and "See the Future".

A compilation of the Fable II disc with all the downloadable content was made available in Europe, sold as "Fable II - Game of the Year Edition" in September 2009. The "Game of the Year Edition" was made available in North America using the Platinum Hits branding in January 2010.

== Reception ==
=== Critical reception ===
Reception

Aggregate score
Aggregator	Score
Metacritic	89/100

Review scores
Publication	Score
Electronic Gaming Monthly	A−
Eurogamer	10/10
Game Informer	9.25/10
GamePro	4.5/5
GameSpot	8.5/10
GamesRadar+	10/10
GameTrailers	8.6/10
IGN	9.5/10
Official Xbox Magazine (UK)	8/10
Official Xbox Magazine (US)	9.5/10
VideoGamer.com	9/10
X-Play	5/5

Fable II received universal acclaim from both audiences and critics.

Eurogamer welcomed the "bread crumb" trail feature in the game, "as leads you ever onwards to your next objective, but even though you can't get lost it still allows for deep exploration". OXM lauded the game as "probably the most consistent sequel ever made" and suggested combat is "great when you're winning and nothing but irritating when you're losing".

Edge ranked the game #52 on its list of "The 100 Best Games To Play Today", stating that "with a quest that tugs you through to the plot and a bucolic paradise ripe for exploration, never before has so much work been put into making sure the humble player feels special".

People for the Ethical Treatment of Animals (PETA) praised Fable II for its animal-friendly nature, giving it the Proggy Award for the most animal-friendly game of 2008, saying they enjoyed the game's pro-vegetarianism, giving the player purity points for eating non-meat products and corruption points for eating meat. However, there are also achievements encouraging players to hurt particular animals.

=== Sales ===
According to NPD, the game attained the status of best-selling title in the United States across all platforms for its debut month of October 2008 with 790,000 copies sold. Such sales volume occurred despite the game's release on 24 October consequently allowing only nine days of sales before the end of the month. The game received a "Platinum" sales award from the Entertainment and Leisure Software Publishers Association (ELSPA), indicating sales of at least 300,000 copies in the United Kingdom.

Fable II was a success, and, with approximately 3.5 million copies sold as of 11 March 2010, it is a best-selling RPG title for Xbox 360.

=== Awards ===
- IGN Best of 2008:
  - Best Original Score (Xbox 360)
- Xplay's Best Game of 2008 award
- Joystiq's Best Game of 2008 award
- Best Action and Adventure Game of 2008, British Academy Video Games Awards

During the 12th Annual Interactive Achievement Awards, the Academy of Interactive Arts & Sciences nominated Fable II for "Role-Playing Game of the Year", and outstanding achievement in "Animation", "Game Design", "Gameplay Engineering", "Original Music Composition" and "Original Story".

In 2010, the game was included as one of the titles in the book 1001 Video Games You Must Play Before You Die. In 2023, it was listed as the 93rd best video game of all time by a GQ poll which surveyed video game journalists across the industry.

=== Technical issues ===
A number of users, writing on the Fable II message board, have experienced technical issues with the game. The most notable were the freezing, progression bugs, and incompatibility with standard-definition television screens.

== Sequel ==
Fable III was released on Xbox 360 in October 2010 and Microsoft Windows in May 2011.
