= Fable III =

2010 video game

- Developer: Lionhead Studios
- Publisher: Microsoft Game Studios
- Producer: Jeremie Texier
- Designers: Peter Molyneux; Josh Atkins
- Programmers: Guillaume Portes; Simon Carter
- Artists: John McCormack; Simon Jaques
- Writer: Mark Llabres Hill
- Composer: Russell Shaw
- Series: Fable
- Platforms: Xbox 360, Windows
- Release: Xbox 360: NA: 26 October 2010; AU: 26 October 2010; EU: 29 October 2010; Windows: NA: 17 May 2011; AU: 19 May 2011; EU: 20 May 2011
- Genre: Action role-playing
- Modes: Single-player, multiplayer

Fable III is a 2010 action role-playing video game developed by Lionhead Studios and published by Microsoft Game Studios for the Xbox 360 and Microsoft Windows. The third and final game in the Fable series, the story focuses on the player character's struggle to overthrow the King of Albion, the player character's brother, by forming alliances and building support for a revolution. After a successful revolt, the player becomes the monarch and is tasked with attempting to defend Albion from a great evil. The game includes voice acting by Ben Kingsley (Sabine), Stephen Fry (Reaver), Simon Pegg (Ben Finn), Naomie Harris (Page), Michael Fassbender (Logan), Zoë Wanamaker (Theresa), Bernard Hill (Sir Walter Beck), Nicholas Hoult (Elliot), John Cleese (Jasper), Jonathan Ross (Barry Hatch), Adjoa Andoh (Kalin), Kellie Bright (Hero of Brightwall female), and Louis Tamone (Hero of Brightwall male).

The game was released on 29 October 2010 for Xbox 360 and on 20 May 2011 for PC via both Games for Windows and Steam. The PC version includes a Hardcore mode and 3D functionality not found in the Xbox 360 version. The game received generally positive reviews.

== Gameplay ==
The player controls the Royal Hero on their adventure to usurp the current monarch and to then manage the kingdom. While progressing along the main story, the player will have to make impactful decisions that will reflect their standing among their subjects, and which will also have consequences in the future that the player must address. A morality system divides most actions as either "good" or "evil", with good-aligned actions generally expressing generosity, kindness, and forgiveness, whereas evil-aligned actions represent selfishness, greed, and cruelty. Most moral decisions are prompted by dialogue branches, but the player's standing will also be influenced by side quests and how frequently they commit crimes, such as robbery or murder. Rewards, in the form of guild seals and gifts, can be earned through how they are viewed by the populace.

Combat encounters are frequent. The Royal Hero has three main methods of attack: a melee attack, a ranged attack, and magic. The player can customize each of these attacks with different weapons, such as choosing between a sword or hammer as a melee weapon, or the capability of combining two types of spells. Attacks can be held and charged in order to unleash powerful flourishes, at the cost of making the player stationary. Critical hits will put the player and their target into a unique kill animation based on the weapon used and the enemy type being attacked. Over the course of the game, the player will increase their weapons' capabilities. Weapons also change shape and design based on the actions of the player.

The Royal Hero is joined by a pet dog that can be named by the player. The dog will travel alongside the Royal Hero and can be played with, pet, and talked down to. While exploring, the dog can guide the player to treasure chests or point out buried secrets, and they will growl if enemies are ahead. The dog will also assist in combat, primarily in ripping out the throats of downed enemies, but additional tricks can be learned to improve the dog's capabilities.

Instead of a conventional pause menu, Fable III brings the player to the Sanctuary, a hub location that the Royal Hero physically walks through. While in the Sanctuary, the player is safe from combat and can access their weapons, costumes, achievements, save files, and system settings. A map is also available, allowing the player to fast travel across the world, view available quests, and manage their properties.

Gold is an important aspect of the game, especially in the second half of the story where the player is expected to raise around 6.5 million gold before war begins. Money can be earned in many methods. Items and treasures can be pawned at pawnshops, and as prices fluctuate, it's possible to earn a profit on items by buying low and selling high. Virtually every shop and home can be bought by the player, which will then earn the player passive income every five minutes (home properties must be rented out to tenants in order to receive rent). These properties can be repaired, and furniture found through the game can be used to decorate homes. The player can also partake in jobs which play out as basic mini-games, earning multiples more money for extended win streaks.

Relationships can also be explored if the player so chooses. If an NPC is in friendly relations with the Royal Hero, the player can choose to develop a romantic relationship, if the NPC's sexuality is compatible. The player can marry and have children, as well as divorce and end relationships.

== Synopsis ==
=== Setting ===
Fable III takes place on the fictional continent of Albion, 50 years after the events of Fable II. The player character of the previous game, the "Hero of Bowerstone", became ruler of Albion and forged a new kingdom with Bowerstone as its capital. As a result, the kingdom has begun entering an industrial age, where large-scale resource gathering and factories have become commonplace. Alongside Albion, the game also includes the foreign land of Aurora, a desert region that is struggling to rebuild after a devastating event.

=== Plot ===
Following the death of their parent, the youngest child of the Hero of Bowerstone (the Royal Hero) lives within the capital's palace alongside their older brother Logan, the new king of Albion. While attending to chores, the young sibling overhears rumours that Logan has changed over the last four years of his rule, becoming excessively tyrannical, to the point that they recently executed a citizen of Albion for a minor crime. Upon seeing their love interest trying to prevent Logan killing a group of citizens that had come to protest his rule, the Royal Hero is left with the choice of sacrificing either the group or their love interest against their will. That night, after their decision, the Royal Hero is advised by their mentor, Sir Walter Beck, to escape with him and plot the downfall of Logan due to his actions. Joined by their butler Jasper, the Royal Hero flees from the castle.

While escaping into a hidden passage, the group find themselves entering the former king's hidden dimension and decide to make use of it, with Jasper remaining to aid the hero from within it. During this time, the Royal Hero encounters Theresa, the enigmatic Seeress of the Spire alongside their distant and ancient relative, who foresees them becoming the new ruler and saving Albion from a terrible fate. Guided by her, alongside Walter, the young hero begins seeking out allies across Albion and gains help from several people they meet: Sabine, leader of the "Dwellers", a nomadic community that lives in the mountains; Major Swift and Ben Finn, soldiers from the Royal Army; and Page, leader of the "Bowerstone Resistance". Just as the group seem ready to make moves for a revolution, Logan catches wind of his sibling's actions and captures Swift, promptly executing him for treason.

Branded as traitors, the Royal Hero and his allies go into exile. At Walter's suggestion, the group travel to Aurora, a desert region across the ocean, and form an alliance with Kalin, the leader of Aurora. While attempting to gain Kalin's support, the group learn about a creature called the Crawler which led the forces of the Darkness into devastating the desert land, and discover that Logan's actions were due to his discovery of this information and the fact that the creature will soon attempt to attack the Kingdom of Albion and exterminate all life. Theresa confirms that the threat is real, but points out that Logan is not capable enough of confronting it, making clear that the Royal Hero must intervene and remove him from the throne. With Kalin's full support, the group launch their revolution against Logan, successfully overthrowing him and appointing the Royal Hero as the next monarch. In their first rule, the Royal Hero is left the choice of executing Logan for his crimes, or pardoning him for acting in Albion's defense against the Crawler.

By this point, the Royal Hero learns that they have a year to raise around 6.5 million gold in order to finance an army to defend Albion against the Crawler and its forces. As ruler, they soon face several challenges to determine how to raise the money needed, leading to tough decisions on whether to do the right thing and improve people's lives, fulfill promises to allies, or exploit resources and turn their back on those that supported them in order to focus on raising funds, with the Royal Hero able to invest their own personal funds to the kingdom's treasury. Eventually, after a year has passed, the Royal Hero finds themselves leading what forces they have managed to amass in defending Albion, by holding back against the Crawler's forces. However, the battle leads to Walter being possessed, forcing the Royal Hero to kill him in order to defeat the Crawler. The main story concludes with the Royal Hero left in charge of Albion, and dealing with the consequences of their decisions as monarch and any casualties caused during the battle.

== Development ==
At the beginning of the Gamescon announcement of Fable III, Molyneux stated that the game was taking a different theme compared to the others as he believes the third game in a series to be hard to do correctly: "If all the rules have been established and all you offer is a new story and a handful of locations, people will start to lose interest".

In an interview with Official Xbox Magazine, Molyneux spoke about how Fable was at risk of becoming a generic game where the player started off underpowered and weak but slowly got more powerful after they met the bad guy. After the player killed the bad guy, the credits would roll. Believing that is the formula that applies to many games, he asked why games "end at potentially the most exciting bit?" It was this that formed the basis of Fable III, where the player can overthrow the tyrant before becoming ruler themselves. He stated that it was when the player was ruler that the consequences of "who you are going to be, are you going to be good or evil, cruel or kind" stopped applying only to the player, but affected the entire country.

Molyneux hinted that there may be drawbacks to leaving a player's castle too often to investigate crimes or fight wars, asking:

Are you going to be a king that is the equivalent to Picard in Star Trek? Quite honestly, if the captain of the ship was going down to planets and getting involved in battles I'd be worried because I think he should stay in his chair. But if he chooses to go down and get involved, that's the freedom we give you as a king.

Talking about the inspiration for Fable III, Molyneux said "if in Fable the inspiration was folklore and in Fable II the inspiration was King Arthur and Robin Hood, then Fable III is definitely the rebels and monarchs – both modern-day and historic":

What's so interesting about that is you look at it and you realise that "Gee, these people who ruled our land up until very recently were actually very creative with their power and abused it and used it in many evil ways". Take Henry VIII, let's just go through some of the things this guy did. Rather than say, "Hey, this marriage is not working out so well", he just decided to completely kill off his wives. Not only did he do that, but to do the deed he just got rid of religion and replaced it with a new one. He also took five percent of the entire tax income – the equivalent of billions of pounds in today's world – and spent it on his personal wine cellar, while many people within the country were suffering from starvation and plague. This guy definitely wasn't that nice guy, and if you write that down he sounds really evil. Does history paint him as being really evil? Not really, it paints him as being a bit of a jolly chap who was quite infatuated with six women. That's fascinating inspiration and we really want to give you the power to be that colourful when you're a ruler.

There are also new takes on traditional Fable concepts such as morphing, where the player's weapon changes depending on what they do, and their alignment. If the Hero kills large numbers of skeletons their weapon will appear to be made of bones, whereas if they go around killing innocent people their weapon will begin to drip with blood. The weapon would also level throughout the game, making it sharper and more deadly. Another example is the "Extreme Emote" system. For example, if someone angers the Hero, they can show them their true nature, with either demonic or angelic wings sprouting out of their back.

Lionhead Studios associate sound producer Georg Backer said that Fable III contains over 47 hours of recorded speech. This rises from 36 hours of recorded speech in Fable II. Backer said that the AI is the "biggest chunk of dialogue". Backer also said that the over 47 hours include "gossip lines" in which the "AI talk to you about what is happening in the game". The "30 or 40" different types of AI characters each have "about 2,000 lines". Three writers wrote the 460,000 recorded words in the game and it took more than 80 actors to voice them. Many lines are the ones that previously appeared in Fable II, so how many hours of vocal track are original recordings is unknown.

== Marketing ==
Shortly before Gamescom 2009, images of famous revolutionaries and quotations appeared on Lionhead's website, causing discussion about what the next game Lionhead was developing. During the press conference of Gamescom, where Fable III was announced by Peter Molyneux, Lionhead had decorated the walls with medieval shields and banners.

Lionhead announced in August 2010 that there would be a companion game to Fable III. Peter Molyneux was quick to say that it would not be like Pub Games for Fable II and hinted that it would utilise a mobile phone. The official reveal was made on 28 September for a smartphone application titled "Kingmaker". The game consists of players marking real-world locations for the two factions in the game, the Royals or the Rebels. The game earns players power-ups and gold to use in Fable III. The game was announced for use in the United Kingdom and Ireland, France, Germany, Italy, Netherlands, Spain, and Sweden.

Various downloadable content was announced by Microsoft, ranging from dyes and extra hairstyles to new quests.

=== Retail editions ===
The Xbox 360 standard and limited edition was released on 29 October 2010, with the PC version released in May 2011. Xbox games that were preordered (both standard and limited editions) in participating stores, were given a code for a special weapon, a code for tattoos, and a code to transfer the villager created from the Villager Maker to the game on the release date.

- Xbox 360 - The Standard Edition available on Xbox 360 contains the standard game disk, a game manual and standard plastic casing. Lionhead Studios' Peter Molyneux said as well, that Fable III would also (like Fable II) be released in episodes on Xbox Live Marketplace, some time after the retail version hit the market. The first episode was available free of charge.
- PC - Both a retail version and a downloadable release (via Games for Windows Live) were available.
- Xbox 360 - The "Limited Collector's Edition" contains a standard game disk, a game manual, a new in-game quest, limited edition Fable III playing cards, a "Guild Seal Coin" with good and evil sides to aid the player in making moral decisions, a new "Boxer" dog breed and two new outfits; one for male, one female, a faux book and a new region with a family and a new weapon.
- PC - All Standard Editions of Fable III on PC have contents of the Limited Collector's Edition included for free in the game.

=== Controller ===
Lionhead also released a Fable III limited edition wireless controller for Xbox 360 on 5 October 2010. The controller came with a code to unlock a unique tattoo for the game.

=== Fable: Coin Golf ===
A mini-game called Fable: Coin Golf developed by Ideaworks Game Studio, in close conjunction with Lionhead, was released for Windows Phone 7 on 30 March 2011. Played from an overhead perspective, the quest is to rid the land of evil and conquer each area by getting the Hero Puck into the Pillar of Light in as few shots as possible. Gold earned on the phone could be transferred to Fable III on Xbox 360 or PC and completion of each of the three chapters unlocked a unique weapon in Fable III.

=== Books ===
Three books titled Fable: The Balverine Order, Fable: Edge of the World, and Fable: Blood Ties were released in North America and Europe in October 2010 and October 2011 respectively. The books came with DLC codes. The Balverine Order had a code for a unique weapon called the Shardborne sword while Blood Ties had a code for an exclusive Dye Pack. Both of these items were for Fable III.

== Reception ==
Reception

Aggregate score
Aggregator	Score
Metacritic	X360: 80/100; PC: 75/100

Review scores
Publication	Score
1Up.com	B+
Computer and Video Games	9.2/10
Edge	7/10
Eurogamer	8/10
Game Informer	9/10
GameSpot	X360: 7.5/10; PC: 7/10
GameTrailers	8.9/10
Hardcore Gamer	5/5
IGN	X360: 8.5/10; PC: 6/10
Joystiq	4/5
X-Play	4/5

Fable III received a generally positive critical reception. IGN gave the Xbox 360 version an 8.5/10, praising the final segment of the game involving the player's role as a monarch, the combat system, and the world-building, but criticising its slow beginning and some technical bugs. GameSpot gave the game a 7.5/10, saying: "This gorgeous world is brimming with humor and personality" but felt "a bevy of technical problems and oversimplified gameplay distract from the fun". Official Xbox Magazine said: "Fable III is most memorable not because it makes you laugh, but because it also makes you care. If a spouse gets carved up in your absence, you'll feel pangs of guilt. When your dog saves your bacon during a fight, you'll feel pride".

The PC version of Fable III received more mixed reviews. IGN gave Fable III a 6/10, calling it "a royal disappointment" with "interface not well tailored to the PC platform", "uneven story and pacing", "dull combat" and "repetitive quests". GameSpot gave it a score of 7/10: "It lands on the PC with graphical enhancements and tougher combat" but criticised the "simplified gameplay" which "still distract from the fun".

During the 14th Annual Interactive Achievement Awards, the Academy of Interactive Arts & Sciences nominated Fable III for "Role-Playing/Massively Multiplayer Game of the Year" and "Outstanding Achievement in Original Music Composition".
