= Fable Legends =

2016 video game

- Developer: Lionhead Studios
- Publisher: Microsoft Studios
- Director: David Eckelberry
- Producer: Geoff Smith
- Designers: Alex Skidmore; Ben Brooks; James Blackham
- Artist: Kelvin Tuite
- Writers: Kristen McGorry; Marek Walton; Andrew Walsh
- Composer: Russell Shaw
- Series: Fable
- Engine: Unreal Engine 4
- Platforms: Windows; Xbox One
- Release: Cancelled
- Genre: Action role-playing
- Modes: Single-player, multiplayer

Fable Legends is a cancelled cooperative action role-playing video game developed by Lionhead Studios and projected to be published by Microsoft Studios for Windows and Xbox One. Microsoft announced the cancellation of the game on 7 March 2016. The servers would continue from then until their shut down on 13 April 2016.

== Gameplay ==
Fable Legends was based around four Heroes and a Villain. Each role may be filled by a player via online multiplayer or by an CPU. The same game experience was possible regardless of multiplayer or single player (with four CPU). All of the game's story and quests could have been played single player, using AI heroes as sidekicks or enemies. It was possible to play through the game's content as either a Hero or as a Villain.

During each quest, the four Hero characters must use teamwork to succeed in their objectives, while the Villain player opposes them with an army of creatures.

=== Heroes ===
Each Hero in Fable Legends was to be a unique character with unique abilities, powers, and gameplay. Several playable heroes were identified as: Sterling, a Prince Charming type of character, who flourishes a rapier and wise cracks; Winter, who is focused on will-based abilities and ice attacks; Rook, focusing on ranged combat with a crossbow; and Inga, a paladin-like character wearing heavy armor, and wielding a sword and shield. Players can customize any Hero, ranging from color and faces to outfits. Customizations would have been unlocked either with earned in-game silver (in game currency), or by purchasing them with real life money. Some cosmetic items may have only been purchasable.

==== Hero Rotation ====
A limited number of heroes would have been available for free at a given time, after which a new set of heroes would take their place for everybody to play for a period of time. Heroes could have also been purchased for permanent access by earned in-game currency or by real-life currency.

=== Villains ===
The villain player controls the nature of the quest the hero characters embark on, such as where enemies spawn, how aggressive they are, when the boss will come lumbering out of its lair, when to bring down an impassable portcullis or lay a trap to separate heroes from each other to thwart them. The Villain has a certain number of "creature points", which he uses during a setup phase to plan his strategy. Each creature costs a certain number of points to summon. During setup, the Villain can also place a certain number of interactive objects in the quest, such as traps and gates.

Once the battle has begun, the Villain player focuses on ordering his creatures about in real time in a similar manner to an RTS game. He can order the creatures to attack a specific Hero, to activate special abilities, and to position for ambushes. During combat, he can also activate gates to damage and split up the Heroes, and use his traps to distract and wound them.

=== Social play ===
Like other games in the series, Fable Legends would allow players to interact with villagers and customize their characters with weapons, looks, armour, abilities and more. In the hub-city of Brightlodge, players would have had the opportunity to partake in jobs, play mini-games and enjoy pub games. Once the player selects a quest, they would be sent out into the world.

=== Platforms ===
Since the game has multiplayer capabilities, players would require an active Xbox Live subscription to play on Xbox One. On Windows 10, it was set to have a free-to-play model.

Gameplay would have been in sync across platforms. Players could've played on Windows 10 and continue their progress on Xbox One and vice versa.

== Synopsis ==
Fable Legends takes place several hundred years before the events of the original trilogy. This is a period of magic, folklore, and mythology, and humanity has yet to discover meaningful technology. Most people huddle in small villages, too witless and scared to venture out into the scary world about. Heroes are more common, but there is no Heroes' Guild yet, and the Heroes must rely on each other to succeed.

The story of one quest revealed at gamescom told of an ancient artifact called "The Moon on the Stick", which the children of Albion once made wishes to. The heroes in Fable Legends are on a quest to locate this artifact.

== Development ==
In 2012, Lionhead Studios parent company Microsoft Studios mandated that the next Fable game needed to be in the games as a service model. According to Lionhead developers, Microsoft felt the popularity of the Fable series was waning, and a service model game would reinvigorate interest. At the time, service model games such as League of Legends were immensely popular, and Microsoft believed single-player games were on the decline. One developer went as far as to claim Microsoft effectively told Lionhead "You make a service game or you get closed down". As a result, a Fable 4 pitch that would have featured a traditional single-player campaign with a heavy emphasis on English folklore and Victorian era historical elements was rejected, and Fable Legends was instead greenlit sometime between July and August 2012.

In a Eurogamer article about the history of Lionhead Studios, author Wesley Yin-Poole notes that the exact origins of the game are unclear, as many of the developers interviewed gave conflicting answers. Some developers claim Fable Legends began as an offshoot of the unreleased Project Opal, an ambitious game that would have utilized cloud computing to connect three different components of the game that were each exclusive to computers, console, and mobile devices respectively. One developer stated, "They were looking to put the Fable name on Opal somehow, because they were unsure it would work by itself as a standalone. It was a project that wasn't gaining any ground. And then this new idea came in and Opal just seemed to end, and Fable Legends just seemed to start." Other developers claim the idea for Fable Legends came from small internal project called F-Versus, in which four player would cooperate to complete levels, and a fifth player who would control the enemies and layout of the levels.

Since Lionhead had never developed service model or free-to-play games, they decided to hire several developers with experience in monetization and competitive multiplayer game design. John Needham, who had worked on games such as City of Heroes and Marvel Super Hero Squad Online, was hired as the head of the studio in April 2013. David Eckelberry, who had worked on games such as Dungeons & Dragons Online and The Lord of the Rings Online, was likewise brought on as the lead designer. In general, Lionhead developers saw these hires as a "pivot" in the company's philosophy. One developer said, "It was about moving our culture away from the previous Lionhead culture, which was around [Peter Molyneux] at the helm ... It was trying to move to an environment where, actually, as team sizes get bigger and bigger, it's great if we have more autonomy in the team, great if people could take more responsibility, great if we had better transparency and communication."

=== Announcement and beta ===
Fable Legends was announced on 20 August 2013 with a cinematic trailer directed by Ben Hibon and narrated by Michael Gambon as the Villain. The first revealed gameplay footage was shown in June 2014 with gameplay performed on stage by the development team. A limited, closed multiplayer beta began on 16 October. Made on a budget of around $75 million, it was going to be one of the most expensive video games of all time.

The game was intended to have a 5–10 year lifecycle, and to be integrated into the cloud features of the Xbox One. SmartGlass features would have allowed villain players to make their plan of attack before a quest.

Microsoft also intended to release Fable Legends on Windows 10, exclusive to the Windows 10 Store. The game would have featured cross-platform multiplayer between Microsoft Windows and Xbox One. Also support for DirectX 12 was to be added with the game's release.

Lionhead confirmed that the game would use a free-to-play model. Initially for 2015, the game was officially delayed to following year, so as to give additional time for Lionhead Studios to polish the game. An open beta was set to be available in the first or second quarter of 2016.

=== Cancellation ===
Microsoft cancelled the game in March 2016 and closed Lionhead Studios. The game's beta ended on 13 April, with players who had purchased in-game gold receiving full refund from all in-game purchases.
