= Lionhead Studios =

British video game developer, 1997–2016

Lionhead Studios Limited
- Type: Subsidiary
- Industry: Video games
- Predecessor: Bullfrog Productions
- Founded: July 1997; 29 years ago
- Founders: Peter Molyneux; Mark Webley; Tim Rance; Steve Jackson
- Defunct: 29 April 2016; 10 years ago
- Fate: Dissolved
- Successors: 22cans Media Molecule; Two Point Studios; PixelCount Studios; Playground Games; Flaming Fowl Studios
- Headquarters: Guildford, England
- Key people: Peter Molyneux (managing director) (1997–2012); Mark Webley (chief operating officer); Gary Carr (chief creative officer) (2011–2015); Tim Rance (chief technology officer)
- Products: Black & White series Fable series The Movies
- Parent: Microsoft Studios (2006–2016)
- Website: Official website (archived version from 1 April 2016)

Lionhead Studios Limited was a British video game developer founded in July 1997 by Peter Molyneux, Mark Webley, Tim Rance, and Steve Jackson. The company is best known for the Black & White and Fable series. Lionhead started as a breakaway from developer Bullfrog Productions, which was also founded by Molyneux. Lionhead's first game was Black & White, a god game with elements of artificial life and strategy games. Black & White was published by Electronic Arts in 2001. Lionhead Studios is named after Webley's hamster, which died not long after the naming of the studio, as a result of which the studio was very briefly renamed to Redeye Studios.

Black & White was followed up with the release of an expansion pack named Black & White: Creature Isle. Lionhead released Fable, from satellite developer Big Blue Box. In 2005, Lionhead released The Movies and Black & White 2. Lionhead was acquired by Microsoft Studios in April 2006 due to encountering financial difficulties. Many Lionhead developers left around this time, including co-founder Jackson and several developers who left to found Media Molecule. Molyneux left Lionhead in early 2012 (shortly after the resignation of another group of developers who were dissatisfied with the company) to found 22cans because he wanted to be more creative. After Molyneux's departure, Microsoft had Lionhead switch to developing games as a service games. As a result, there were many changes within the studio.

In early March 2016, Microsoft announced that it had proposed closing Lionhead Studios and that the planned game Fable Legends would be cancelled; Lionhead was closed down almost two months later, on 29 April. A few months after Lionhead's closure, two key people (Webley and Gary Carr, who was Lionhead's creative director) founded Two Point Studios.

== History ==
=== Founding ===
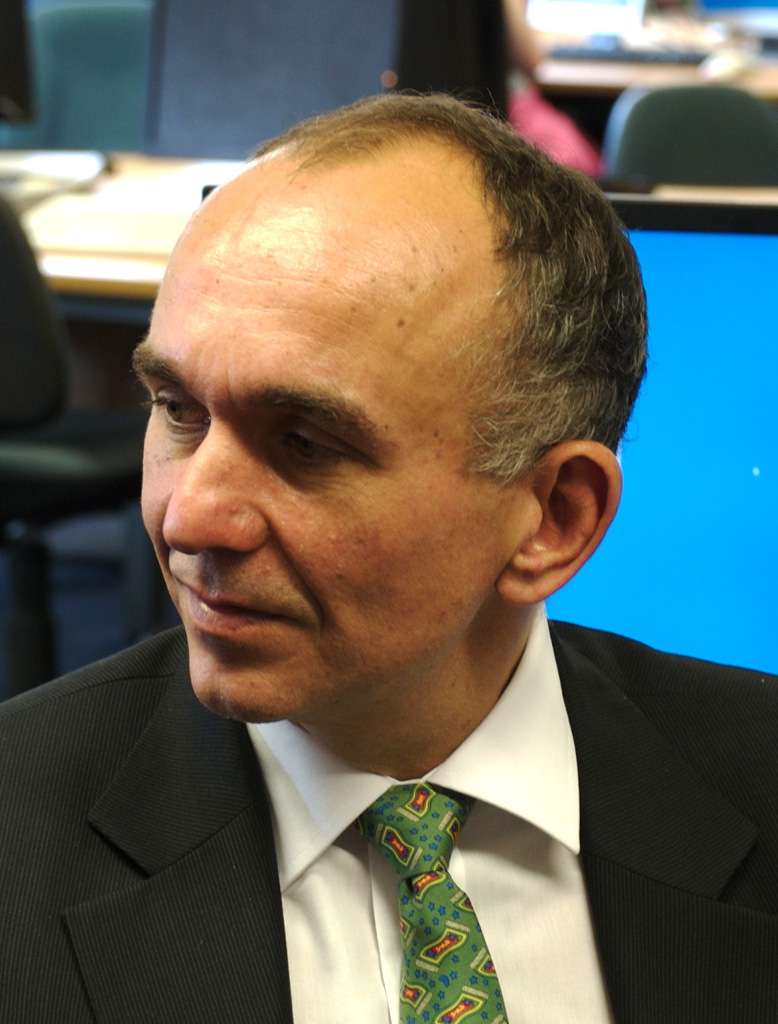
Peter Molyneux (2007), co-founder of Lionhead Studios

Peter Molyneux founded Bullfrog Productions in 1987, which was later acquired by Electronic Arts (EA) in 1995. Around 1996, Molyneux had contemplated leaving Bullfrog, as he felt limited in his creative freedom under Electronic Arts. He along with Lionhead's eventual co-founders, Mark Webley, Tim Rance and Steve Jackson, started developing plans for a new studio. In 1997, due to a series of events and from issues arising between Molyneux and Electronic Arts, he ultimately left the company in July 1997, co-founding Lionhead shortly after that, along with Mark Webley, Tim Rance, and Steve Jackson (who co-founded Games Workshop and co-authored the Fighting Fantasy series). On his recruitment, Jackson said "It was an offer I couldn't refuse", as he wanted to get back to making games instead of writing about them (Jackson had interviewed Molyneux about Bullfrog and Dungeon Keeper, but for much of it, they discussed German board games instead. This led to them meeting frequently for an event called "Games Night"). Molyneux assured him that his lack of programming knowledge was an asset rather than a problem. Lionhead is the second Bullfrog break-off group, after Mucky Foot Productions (founded in February 1997). According to Glenn Corpes (who co-founded another: Lost Toys), Lionhead was Molyneux's "take on what Bullfrog used was".

The idea of the company was to develop quality games without growing too large. On the differences between Lionhead and Bullfrog, Molyneux said: "This time round we're a professionally run company. Gone are the days of shooting work experience people with guns". He also said that Lionhead would develop only one game at a time. Early Lionhead employees included Demis Hassabis, Mark Healey (Lionhead's first artist), and Alex Evans.

The name Lionhead came from Webley's pet hamster, who had died the week prior to the foundation. The hamster's death was taken as a bad sign, so other names, including Black Box, Red Rocket, Midnight, and Hurricane were considered but none had unanimous support. The name Red Eye was then suggested, and everyone liked it (the decision needed to be quick as Molyneux was to be interviewed by Edge). However, for reasons including the name being in use by many other companies, the domains redeye.com and redeye.co.uk being taken and lionhead.co.uk had already been registered by Rance, the company already having Lionhead business cards, and the possibility of the name Red Eye having drinking connotations, the name was reverted to Lionhead. By the time the name was reverted, it was too late for Edge to amend their interview, so it was published with the company being referred to as Redeye Studios. In the interview, Molyneux stated that his ambition for the company was to "make it a world-renowned software development house – known in Europe, Japan and America for top-quality games".

=== Early years ===
Word about Lionhead began spreading quickly. Within the first month, companies including Sega, Nintendo, Eidos, GTI, and Lego had arranged meetings. One day, "a major Japanese console manufacturer" had come to present plans for a "next generation console", but by then, Lionhead's first game had already been committed.

By the end of July, Lionhead had signed a one-game contract with Electronic Arts. The studio was initially run out of Molyneux's mansion in Elstead, before relocating to the University of Surrey Research Park in 1998. According to Jackson, it was "a mere stone's throw from Bullfrog's old lily pad on the very same estate". For the staff who had come from Bullfrog, it was "a little like coming home". Six companies were competing for a space, and Lionhead won due to Molyneux and Bullfrog's reputation.

Lionhead had originally intended to make their first public appearance at the E3 trade show in May 1997. This was cancelled at the last minute because there was not yet any deal with Electronic Arts, and there was the possibility of not being able to discuss Lionhead. The debut was made in September at the European Computer Trade Show instead. According to Jackson, "Everyone" was interested in Lionhead: journalists from many major European magazines frequently turned up at Lionhead's suite.

By August 1998, after the studio placed a job advertisement in Edge which received over 100 applications, Russell Shaw had been hired as Head of Music. Lionhead's first title was Black & White, which was published by Electronic Arts under terms of Molyneux's severance package from departing Bullfrog. It was released in 2001 to widespread critical acclaim. It won BAFTA Awards for Interactivity and Moving Images in 2001, and Academy of Interactive Arts & Sciences awards for Computer Innovation and Computer Game of the Year the following year. An expansion pack Black & White: Creature Isle, was released the following year. In Lionhead's early years, Jackson wrote columns about the company and the development of Black & White for magazines such as PC Zone and Génération 4. The articles were also published on Lionhead's website.

According to Eurogamer, Lionhead "was a continuation of the culture and development ethic of Bullfrog", which included the playing of pranks. One such prank was one "that would go down in Lionhead history". It involved a visit from the Mayor of Guildford during the development of Black & White: Healey had inserted a couple of wires into a woollen glove with the other ends put into a floppy drive. Molyneux was forced to explain to the Mayor how the game's on-screen hand was controlled by the glove (which Healey was wearing), when it was actually being controlled by a mouse with Healey's other hand, which were hidden. The Mayor fell for the trick.

By June 2002, Lionhead had established satellite companies, including Big Blue Box Studios, Intrepid Computer Entertainment (also called Intrepid Developments), and Black & White Studios. Lionhead and its satellite studios had 107 employees and were developing six games: Fable, The Movies, a project called Creation (also called Dimitri), Black & White NG (Black & White Next Generation), Black & White 2, and BC, despite Molyneux's earlier statement that Lionhead would only work on one at a time. The idea to form these satellite studios came from Jackson during the development of Black & White. Big Blue Box Studios was founded in July 1998 by Ian Lovett and Simon and Dene Carter, because of a desire to leave Electronic Arts and "the sadly ravaged corpse of Bullfrog it had left behind". Intrepid Computer Entertainment was founded by Joe Rider and Matt Chilton, and Black & White Studios was headed by Jonty Barnes, who was a programmer on Dungeon Keeper and Black & White. According to Molyneux, The Movies came about because Lionhead listened to some financial advisers after the release of Black & White, who said that the company would die if it did not float on the stock market. The company then went for initial public offering, which Molyneux said was "The most stupid thing that ever happened" because it meant having to expand quickly and develop more games. In the early 2000s, Lionhead was "growing very fast". The company was nominated for the 2002 Golden Joystick Awards British Developer of the Year award.

Before Fable shipped, Lionhead purchased Big Blue Box and Intrepid. The decision to merge Big Blue Box with Lionhead was made to accelerate the completion of the game. Fable was released in 2004 for the Xbox, and won AIAS awards for Outstanding Achievement in Character or Story Development and Outstanding Achievement in Original Musical Composition in 2005. Dimitri was cancelled. In 2003, Gary Carr joined Lionhead. Due to the stock market crash in the aftermath of 9/11, Lionhead sought investments from venture capitalists. Deals with various firms were signed in July 2004. This came at a time when the company needed money for the development of five games to be released by different publishers.

=== Acquisition by Microsoft ===
In 2005, Lionhead released two titles: Black & White 2 and The Movies. Around this time, Lionhead had roughly 220 employees. These titles did not achieve a massive impact in sales (Molyneux described The Movies as "a disaster" due to lack of playtesting. However, it won a BAFTA Award for Simulation in 2006.), and Lionhead soon afterwards encountered financial difficulty. Due to this, on 6 April 2006, Lionhead Studios was acquired by Microsoft. Ubisoft was another contender for the acquisition of Lionhead, but Molyneux believed Microsoft to be "perfect", and said people wanted "the safety and security of being part of something bigger". Microsoft wanted the Fable series to be an Xbox exclusive, and knew that if Ubisoft had acquired Lionhead, it would have gone to the PlayStation 3 instead, a conclusion that Webley concurred with. Lionhead were concerned with securing the company's future and protecting jobs and spent "months" preparing for the acquisition. Some, such as Andy Robson (Head of Testing), were dissatisfied with the deal. He claimed Lionhead were trying to cheat him out of money he was owed. Molyneux believed that Microsoft were pleased with the deal, and said that they made their money back due to the release of the "fantastically successful" Fable II (it won a BAFTA Award for Action and Adventure in 2009) for the Xbox 360 in 2008. In late 2005, Healey left Lionhead with Evans and a couple of other developers to found Media Molecule. Jackson also left in 2006 when Microsoft took over.

The general consensus amongst Lionhead was that the buyout "benefited Lionhead greatly". Microsoft purchased a lease that enabled Lionhead to expand to multiple floors, a canteen, and an office revamp. According to Fable franchise director Ted Timmins, the improvements felt like Lionhead was "a real developer". The pranks were also reduced. During the development of Fable II, Lionhead received death threats because the game featured a gay character and some of the leading characters were black. Microsoft, for the most part, left Lionhead alone during the development of Fable II, but did ask them to change the icon of a condom (the game featured a dog who was able to dig them up) to a modern one, despite the game being set in an earlier era. Lionhead and Microsoft conflicted over the game's marketing: Microsoft believed that role-playing games were about dragons and wanted to market the game as such, despite Lionhead's insistence that the game was "a Monty Python-esque comedy". According to Fable art director John McCormack, the marketing was "shit" and that dragons were Dungeons & Dragons fare and had nothing to do with Fable. Despite the row, most of the Fable II team thought highly of the relationship between Lionhead and Microsoft, and after the game's release, Lionhead won a BAFTA Award for the best action adventure game. There was also a dispute over Fable III's box art. The game was developed and released in 18 months, but fell short of the expectations set by the previous installment. Six months before its release, Lionhead attempted to integrate Kinect into the game, but failed. In June 2009, Molyneux became creative director of Microsoft Studios' European division, a position he held concurrently with the head of Lionhead.

Another Kinect-based project, Milo & Kate was in development but was cancelled. Molyneux blamed the cancellation on Kinect's technology and Microsoft's attitude towards their target market. Its development team moved to Fable: The Journey, another Kinect game that was released in 2012 and was "disastrous".

=== Molyneux's departure ===
By early 2012, Lionhead were suffering what had been described as "Black Monday". Several Lionhead veterans, dissatisfied with the way the company was heading, resigned on the same day. According to McCormack, Molyneux "lost it" and ordered them to leave the premises immediately. Molyneux apologised for this outburst, and soon afterwards, in March, he too left Lionhead and founded 22cans, along with Rance, who had ceased being Lionhead's chief technology officer sometime prior. He was also joined by Paul McLaughlin, who was Lionhead's head of art. Webley then temporarily took over as head of the studio, before being replaced by Scott Henson early the following year. Molyneux said he left Lionhead because he wanted to increase his creativity. He also said that after 12 years (the series began in 2000 by Big Blue Box Studios), everyone was "tired" of the Fable series. Craig Oman, producer of Fable Anniversary, said that Molyneux's departure gave Lionhead an opportunity to reidentify itself.

Molyneux's departure had a much greater impact than those of other veterans who had already left the company. Lionhead became more professional and organised according to some staff. One said that Molyneux had the power to keep Microsoft at bay, and his departure left the remaining staff vulnerable. Around this time, Microsoft insisted that Lionhead make a games as a service Fable game to reinvigorate interest in the series or face closure. Due to the switch to service based model, the idea of Fable IV was rejected, and experts in monetisation and competitive game design were hired to assist the transition. At some point, John Needham became head of Lionhead. Creative director Carr (who had played major roles in Milo & Kate, The Movies, and Fable: The Journey) left in September 2015, and a new one, David Eckelberry, was brought in. Lionhead encountered difficulty in this project, Fable Legends, because they had not done anything like it before.

=== Closure ===
On 7 March 2016, Microsoft announced the cancellation of Fable Legends and a proposed closure of Lionhead Studios. The closure came as a shock to some staff, who had suspected Microsoft were concerned but did not think Lionhead would be shut down: it was thought that the worst-case scenario would be that Fable Legends's assets would be used for Fable IV. Some staff put the closure down to "a string of bad decisions and mismanagement". The game was supposed to be released in summer 2015, after the release of Windows 10, and some said Lionhead had failed to meet their own targets. To comply with UK employment law, there was a consultation period and the Fable Legends servers were not shut down until mid-April so that customers could get refunds. There was a small "live operations" team that conducted this process, but for others, work was optional. An attempt to save the project was made, under the name of Project Phoenix. This would have involved developing it with a new studio under licence from Microsoft, who supported the idea, but it failed due to lack of time and the fact that many Lionhead employees had found new jobs. On 29 April 2016, Lionhead closed down. One Lionhead developer, Charlton Edwards (the only one remaining who had worked on Black & White), said there was a giveaway and he received some of the "trophies". Both current and former Lionhead developers gave the studio a send-off at a pub. On 26 July, Webley and Carr founded Two Point Studios, a studio that some former Lionhead developers later joined.

In the 2021 documentary Power On: The Story of Xbox, Microsoft admitted that its handling of Lionhead Studios was a mistake. Phil Spencer, the former head of Xbox at Microsoft, admitted that forcing Lionhead to work on Kinect and the impact of that on the quality of its games was at fault. Spencer said "You acquire a studio for what they're great at now, and your job is to help them accelerate how they do what they do, not them accelerate what you do."
