= Battle of the Gods =

Battle of the Gods may refer to:

- Battle of the Gods and Giants or Gigantomachy, in Ancient Greek myth, often depicted in art
- Black & White 2: Battle of the Gods, a video game
- Dragon Ball Z: Battle of Gods, a 2013 animated film
- Battle of the Gods (play-by-mail game), 1984
- Theomachy ("battle of the gods"), a general term for battles involving the Ancient Greek gods
