= Black & White 2: Battle of the Gods =

- Developer: Lionhead Studios
- Publisher: Electronic Arts
- Designers: Peter Molyneux, Ron Millar
- Platforms: Windows, macOS
- Release: NA: 24 April 2006; EU: 28 April 2006
- Genres: Real-time strategy, God game
- Mode: Single-player

Black & White 2: Battle of the Gods is an expansion pack for Lionhead's Black & White 2, in which the player is pitted against an enemy god for the first time since the original game. The expansion adds a number of additional miracles to the game, including the ability to resurrect dead citizens or transform corpses into undead soldiers. Two additional creatures make an appearance, although neither is new to the franchise; a tortoise, seen in the original Black & White, and the tiger from the Collector's Edition of Black & White 2.

Saved creatures may be imported from the previous Black & White 2.

== Gameplay ==
The expansion has the same gameplay as B&W2. New buildings include a blacksmith's shop and a hospital. The expansion adds four new miracles:

- Lava Miracle: Causes lava to come out of the ground and burn anything in its path.
- Life Miracle: When this miracle is thrown, it resurrects people back from the dead. If thrown on an undead army, it will destroy them. Also, if dropped on a store house, it causes everything in it to multiply and make it full.
- Death Miracle: Gives a temporary army of Melee Skeleton Warriors. If dropped around a populated area, it will kill anyone in its radius and make them a skeleton.
- Verdant Miracle: When dropped, this miracle will produce animals either out of nowhere or from people and armies within its radius.

== Plot ==
At the climax of Black & White 2, the player defeats the Aztec nation but leaves a number of them alive. Driven by a desire for revenge, they sacrifice their dead in a series of grisly rituals; hence, a god of death is born to rally the Aztecs, now aided with divine power and undead armies, against the player once more.

=== First Land ===
The game starts out on the first land, which the player has no control over, with Aztec survivors worshipping at a temple for their dead. Suddenly, a flash of purple light appears and crashes into the temple, bearing the god of the undead and raises the Aztec soldiers that died as ghosts and skeletons. This ends the first land.

=== Second Land ===
The next land is the Japanese land from the first game. However, the Aztec god has devastated the previous land. A new Greek and Japanese village was created in the middle of the land. But, the male villagers are imprisoned in the capital. The player sends their creature to attack the walls of the prison while the Aztec god tries to kill the creature with fireballs and rocks. After the creature has destroyed the gates, the men make a break for it. The Aztec god sends his armies to kill them but are met with the wrath of the player's creature. When the men are about to make it, the Aztec god rolls giant boulders from atop of the hill to crush and stop them, which is usually unsuccessful. Once the men are back at the village, the Aztec god becomes furious and starts planning an invasion. There are four towns to take over, including a small village that you can impress from doing a silver scroll. When the player starts off, they notice that it is raining over their village, making it impossible to burn anything with the fireball miracle and they have no control over the sky to change the type of weather. These things soon fade as the player takes over villages either through force or though impressiveness (although impressiveness is a lot harder than warfare).

=== Third Land ===
The third land is the Norse. The Aztec god had captured and enslaved the Norse and made their creature do his bidding by taking sacrifices to an altar. The player starts the land with a limited number of people (only Greek) and three separate gates. The player must build up and breed the people in order to continue. North-East of the town is a puzzle with Roman Numerals on it. The player must solve the puzzle by moving the sliders into the empty slots. Once the player has figured it out, then a cut-scene of the enemy creature will be shown being temporarily stunned and stopping what it is doing. It is helpful if the creature is trying to attack, but will not give out tribute. When the enemy creature has sacrificed about ten villagers, two platoons of skeletons will appear and a catapult. The player must defend their gates by destroying the catapult. As the land progresses, the player can capture or impress the other towns to weaken the power of the Aztec god. However, the more of his towns are taken, the more platoons and catapults he will send. Once all the smaller towns have been taken, the Aztec god becomes powerless and can be conquered. After conquering the land, the Aztec god will mock the player and say that the first two lands were just distractions and the real goal is the Greek Homeland. This is where the fourth land starts...

=== Fourth Land ===
The fourth land is the Greek Homeland from the first game. However, the Aztec god has built a foothold capital and two other towns encircling around the only surviving Greek town. The undead god continues to mock the player and even threatens to use a Hurricane Wonder off the edge of the town. The player must defend the town from the Wonder attacks and also from miracles being thrown from the closest town on a cliff. To defend from this, the Aztec god will be focusing his attention on one spot of the town. Placing a shield miracle in the area will thwart his attacks. Although difficult, impressiveness can be effective, as long as the player prevents any of the Aztec god's attacks from damaging the town. However, the Aztec god has an Earthquake Wonder which is being charged by the Aztec people. When it is charged, he will launch just outside the player's influence ring. Capturing the Aztec Capital could prevent this, however, the player can still defend against it by expanding their influence so that the undead god can't do serious damage. Just like in the last land, there is another puzzle that does the same thing. This will be helpful against the undead ape as he protects and repairs the hurricane wonder.

=== Bonus Land ===
On all three playable lands there are secret statues that are hidden with the description of "CLICK ME." When the player has collected all three statues, then the player has the option of playing a bonus land. It is more of a survival land than a conquer land. The player starts off with a town in the centre and separate independent Greek towns. The player has no control over the smaller towns even though they are Greek. However, there are skeleton armies appearing and attacking the towns. The player has no wall defences to protect them. But, the three statues that were collected have special powers as they prevent any enemy armies from attacking by electrocuting them. This will give the player enough time to build the town and create armies to defend, and, if evil, attack the towns. With the new land comes a new creature, The Turtle. Even though the turtle is a choice at the beginning of the game, it must be played on this land, which means the player must retrain a new creature. The land ends when the player is defeated.

== Reception ==
Reception

Aggregate score
Aggregator	Score
Metacritic	69/100

Review scores
Publication	Score
1Up.com	C+
Eurogamer	6/10
GameSpot	7.2/10
GameZone	7/10
IGN	7/10
PC Format	70%
PC Gamer (UK)	79%
PC Gamer (US)	67%
PC Zone	70%
X-Play	3/5

Battle of the Gods received "average" reviews, with a 69 from critics and an 8.5 from users on 4 May 2018 according to video game review aggregator Metacritic.
