= 22cans =

British video game developer

22cans Ltd
- Type: Private
- Industry: Video games
- Founded: 20 February 2012; 14 years ago in Farnborough, England
- Founder: Peter Molyneux
- Headquarters: Guildford, England
- Key people: Simon Phillips (CEO); Peter Molyneux (creative director)
- Products: Curiosity: What's Inside the Cube?, Godus
- Website: 22cans.com

22cans Ltd is a British video game developer based in Guildford. It was founded in February 2012 by Peter Molyneux, previously of Bullfrog Productions and Lionhead Studios.

== History ==
Peter Molyneux, who had previously founded Bullfrog Productions and Lionhead Studios, established 22cans on 20 February 2012 in Farnborough. To do so, he left Lionhead and partnered with Tim Rance and Peter Murphy, Lionhead's former chief technology officer and company director, respectively. Molyneux first announced the establishment on 7 March. By April that year, he had received more than 1,000 applications. Significant hires were Jack Attridge in July 2012 and Jamie Stowe in April 2013.

22cans' first game was Curiosity: What's Inside the Cube?, which was released for Android and iOS on 6 November 2012. In 2015, following the troubled launch of Godus, Simon Phillips was hired as the company's chief executive officer, replacing Molyneux, who would henceforth focus on game design. Godus' co-creator and designer Jack Attridge had left the studio by April 2015, while Godus' remaining designer, Konrad Naszynski, left in June 2016, as his contract with the company had ended.

In November 2016, 22cans released The Trail: Frontier Challenge for mobile devices with modest promotion. 22cans and publisher Kongregate later announced in July 2017 they would rework the mobile game for PC, with Molyneux saying they would "take the core gameplay and narrative of The Trail on mobile and reimagine it for Steam players," with gameplay that would be "far more strategic." It was released for Microsoft Windows and macOS on Steam 15 August 2017. It was then released for the Nintendo Switch March 2018.

In February 2019, 22cans announced Legacy, a game inspired by Molyneux's first released game, The Entrepreneur (1984), a text-based business simulation game about running a fledgling company. The studio underwent an undisclosed number of layoffs in February 2021, though confirmed that development would continue. Molyneux announced in December 2021 that Legacy will incorporate blockchain-based elements including non-fungible tokens (NFTs), which will allow players to sell and purchase virtual goods as part of the business simulation gameplay. By March 2022, before the announcement of a release date and more than a year-and-a-half before the game's eventual release, all in-game land plots were sold by 22cans, generating over US$50,000,000 in revenue from cryptocurrency-based sales of digital land NFTs. The game was released to the public on 26 October 2023 on Gala Games as a freemium title for macOS and Microsoft Windows.

In June 2023, Molyneux announced 22cans was working on a new game, likely for PC and console and less likely to be developed for mobile. Though Molyneux gave few details, he said it is the first game he's coded for since his work on Black & White and that the studio has been exploring ideas for the game for the past five years. Molyneux later revealed the project was codenamed Project MOAT and will be set in Albion, a fictional setting from the Fable franchise. The game was first shown at Gamescom 2024 under the title Masters of Albion and described by Molyneux as "an open-world god game" with third person combat elements.

== Games developed ==
Year	Title	Platform(s)	Publisher(s)
2012	Curiosity: What's Inside the Cube?	Android, iOS	22cans
2014	Godus	Android, iOS, macOS, Microsoft Windows	DeNA, 22cans
2016	Godus Wars	macOS, Microsoft Windows	22cans
2016	The Trail: Frontier Challenge	Android, iOS, macOS, Microsoft Windows, Nintendo Switch	Kongregate
2023	Legacy	macOS, Microsoft Windows	Gala Games
2026	Masters of Albion	Microsoft Windows	22cans
