= Masters of Albion =

2026 video game

- Developer: 22cans
- Publisher: 22cans
- Director: Peter Molyneux
- Platform: Windows
- Release: April 22, 2026 (early access)
- Genre: God game
- Mode: Single-player

Masters of Albion is a video game in the god game genre currently in development by 22cans. It has been described by developer Peter Molyneux as "the culmination of my life's work".

== Development ==
In June 2023, Molyneux announced 22cans was working on a new game, likely for PC and console and less likely to be developed for mobile. Though Molyneux gave few details, he said it is the first game he's coded for since his work on Black & White and that the studio has been exploring ideas for the game for the past five years. Molyneux later revealed the project was codenamed Project MOAT and will be set in Albion, a fictional setting from the Fable franchise. The game was first shown at Gamescom 2024 under the title Masters of Albion and described by Molyneux as "an open-world god game" with third person combat elements.

It entered early access on April 22, 2026.

== Reception ==
Video Games Chroncicle called Masters of Albion "a veritable mix of his greatest hits". Eurogamer, commenting on the early access release, described the game as enjoyable and good, but commented that the early access release experienced erratic performance and worried about repetitiveness over its playtime.
