= Voodoo (company) =

French video game company

Voodoo SAS
- Type: Private
- Industry: Video games, mobile apps
- Founded: 2013; 13 years ago
- Founders: Alexandre Yazdi; Laurent Ritter
- Headquarters: Paris, France
- Area served: Worldwide
- Key people: Alexandre Yazdi (CEO); Gabriel Rivaud (VP, games)
- Products: Hole.io, BeReal, Block Jam 3D, Mob Control
- Revenue: ▲$570 million (2023)
- Owner: Goldman Sachs (minority stake); Tencent (minority stake); Groupe Bruxelles Lambert (16%)
- Number of employees: 750 (2023)
- Website: voodoo.io

Voodoo SAS (also referred to as Voodoo.io) is a French developer and publisher of mobile apps and games based in Paris. The company was founded in 2013 by Alexandre Yazdi and Laurent Ritter. Voodoo's games began predominantly as free-to-play "hyper-casual games", which they helped popularize. Since then, the company has shifted to developing and publishing casual games and apps. Led by Alexandre Yazdi and Gabriel Rivaud, Voodoo’s games and apps have surpassed 7 billion downloads as of 2024. The company has been criticised for cloning other games.

== History ==
=== Background and early years (2013–2017) ===
Voodoo was founded in 2013 by Alexandre Yazdi and Laurent Ritter. They had been friends since high school and had previously founded Studio Cadet in 2012, a services company for websites and mobile applications. Yazdi became the chief executive officer of Voodoo, while Gabriel Rivaud acted as the vice-president of games. According to Rivaud, the company was in turmoil for its first four years in operation and opted to change its business strategy thereafter. This change led to the development of “hyper-casual games” by Voodoo. Games were developed focusing on key metrics such as retention and playtime. With this data, the company designed its newer games to attract more players. Using the Unity game engine, Voodoo tested one new game roughly every week. This method resulted in the successful release of Paper.io in 2016.

Through 2017, Voodoo quadrupled its staff count to 80. In May 2018, the American banking company Goldman Sachs, through its West Street Capital Partners VII fund, invested US$200 million in Voodoo. It was the largest fundraising in the French technology sector since 2015. Yazdi and Ritter retained control of the company. At the time, Voodoo had, aside from its Paris headquarters, offices in Montpellier and Strasbourg. A development studio in Berlin, Germany, was established in December 2018, headed by general manager Alexander Willink. The studio started out with roughly ten people, looking to eventually expand to 40 employees. Voodoo later hired key employees from developers Blizzard Entertainment, King, and Mamau.

=== 2019–present ===
By September 2019, Voodoo employed 220 people, including 150 at its Paris headquarters. A publishing office in Istanbul, Turkey, was announced in August 2019 and is headed by publishing director Corentin Selz. This continued with the opening of a Montreal development studio in November 2019, led by Mehdi El Moussali, a former producer for Gameloft. During this time, Voodoo intended to expand and transition beyond hyper-casual games. The company acquired Shoreditch-based developer Gumbug in December that year.

By July 2020, Tencent was looking to acquire a minority stake in Voodoo, which was still majority-owned by Yazdi and Ritter. Tencent acquired a minority stake to undisclosed terms in August that year. At this time, Voodoo was valued at $1.4 billion. According to Yazdi, this deal would help Voodoo to extend their games into the Asia-Pacific market. Voodoo subsequently opened offices in Singapore and Japan later that month, headed by Julian Corbett and Ben Fox, respectively. In total in 2020, Voodoo saw revenues of €380 million, up from €1 million in 2016. The company announced an investment in Istanbul-based developer Fabrika Games in September 2020, and acquired Parisian developer OHM Games in December. OHM Games had developed four games for Voodoo in 2020, which together generated 260 million downloads. Voodoo further bought BidShake, a Tel Aviv company developing a marketing automation platform, in June 2021. Groupe Bruxelles Lambert acquired a 16% stake in Voodoo for €266 million in August 2021, valuing Voodoo at €1.7 billion. The company transitioned from hyper-casual games to what it calls "hybrid casual" games during that year.

Voodoo acquired Beach Bum in September for a reported price of $250–300 million. The Israeli company, the developer of video game adaptations of board and card games, had an annual revenue of $70 million at the time of acquisition. In 2023, Voodoo reported $570 million in revenue, mostly from in-app purchases. Hypercasual games accounted for only 25% of this revenue. Hybrid casual games, Mob Control and Block Jam grossed nearly $100 million each.

== Games ==
The majority of Voodoo's games were free-to-play "hyper-casual games" developed for the Android and iOS mobile operating systems. Games released by the company in this genre include Helix Jump, Baseball Boy, Snake vs Block, Hole.io, Aquapark.io, Purple Diver, Crowd City, and Paper.io. Voodoo games were downloaded 2 billion times by April 2019, 3.7 billion downloads by May 2020, and 5 billion by May 2021. In December 2019, Voodoo games had 2.6 billion downloads, 300 million monthly active users (MAUs), and 1 billion individual players, making Voodoo the leading mobile games publisher. Helix Jump, developed by H8games, became Voodoo's most successful game by number of downloads. It was the most-downloaded game of 2018 with 334 million installs, amassing more than 500 million by August 2020. Voodoo also operates the Blitz app, a gaming platform allowing players to compete in various mobile games and participate in tournaments with cash prizes. Paper.io 2, released in 2018, has been downloaded 266 million times.

Voodoo launched Mob Control in 2021. The project was released as a hyper-casual game but development shifted post-release to hybrid-casual. Also in 2021, Voodoo published Collect Em All developed by Tarboosh Games. Voodoo published Block Jam 3D, a block-matching puzzle game, in 2022.

== Publishing ==
Expanding on the prototyping model of its internal developers, Voodoo began publishing games by external studios. External developers can submit games through an online platform for Voodoo to evaluate. The publisher has worked with over 2,000 such studios, which account for 75% of Voodoo's releases. If a game meets the criteria, it is published by Voodoo which supports product improvements, user acquisition, and monetization.

Voodoo bought BidShake in June 2021, a Tel Aviv company developing a marketing automation platform offering cross-channel advertising solutions for mobile games and apps.

== Apps ==
Outside of games, Voodoo developed the social media platform Wizz in 2020. As of August 2021, the platform has 1 million MAUs in the United States. The company also acquired WeMoms in 2021. WeMoms is a social media platform for women and mothers.

In June 2024, Voodoo acquired the photo-sharing app BeReal for €500 million. BeReal’s main user base is in the US, France, and Japan. The app has had 50 million users since 2022.

== Reception ==
Voodoo has been criticised for releasing apparent clones of indie games. These include Infinite Golf (similar to Desert Golfing), Twisty Road (Impossible Road), The Fish Master (Ridiculous Fishing), Flappy Dunk! (Flappy Bird), Rolly Vortex (Rolling Sky), The Cube (Curiosity: What's Inside the Cube?), and Hole.io (Donut County). In the case of Hole.io, the game used the core gameplay mechanic of Donut County that has the player controls a hole in the ground to consume objects within the environment, progressively growing wider to be able to consume larger objects. Ben Esposito had been working on Donut County for more than five years when Hole.io released in mid-2018, before Donut County's publication. In response to an inquiry from Variety, Voodoo stated that Hole.io was not a copy of Donut County, although both were in the same sub-genre of games. Variety's Michael Futter noted that these games were the only two in this genre. Voodoo further stated “There exists a limited amount of preeminent gameplays. However, there can be an infinite amount of interpretations and execution... In this spirit, other examples of popular gameplays that have been interpreted by many developers are hidden object, casino, bubble shooter, and first-person shooter games.”

== Accolades ==
- #20 on Pocket Gamer.biz's "Top 50 Mobile Game Developers of 2018"
- #5 on Pocket Gamer.biz's "Top 50 Mobile Game Makers of 2019"
- #16 on Pocket Gamer.biz's "Top 50 Mobile Game Makers of 2020"
- #10 on Pocket Gamer.biz's "Top 50 Mobile Game Developers of 2024"
- Best Publisher – Mobile Games Awards 2019
- Revelation of the Year – BFM Awards 2019
- Part of Next40 2021
