= Donut County =

2018 video game

- Developer: Ben Esposito
- Publisher: Annapurna Interactive
- Composers: Daniel Koestner; Ben Esposito
- Engine: Unity
- Platforms: iOS; macOS; Apple TV; Windows; PlayStation 4; Nintendo Switch; Xbox One; Android
- Release: iOS, macOS, Apple TV, Windows, PS4: WW: August 28, 2018; Switch, Xbox One: WW: December 18, 2018; Android: WW: December 1, 2020
- Genre: Puzzle
- Mode: Single-player

Donut County is a puzzle video game developed by American designer Ben Esposito and published by Annapurna Interactive in 2018. The player moves a hole to swallow objects, which makes the hole increase in size. The concept originated in a game jam based on pitches from a Twitter account parody of game designer Peter Molyneux and later added a mechanic similar to that of Katamari Damacy. Other inspirations for the game included Hopi figurines—a theme Esposito later relinquished—and locations from Bruce Springsteen songs. Donut County was released in August 2018 for iOS, macOS, PlayStation 4, and Microsoft Windows platforms, while versions for Xbox One and Nintendo Switch were released in December 2018. It was also released for Android in December 2020.

== Gameplay ==
In Donut County, the player controls a hole across several different levels, each of which is self-contained but has several areas that open up as they progress. The goal of the game is to swallow every object to essentially clear out the level. As the player moves the hole to swallow objects, the hole increases in size. There are some puzzle aspects to this: to swallow objects floating on top of water, the player may need to maneuver the hole to drain part of the water and then have that water consumed by a bird, repeating this until the water is drained. Later in the game, the player gains access to a catapult that fits at the top of the hole. This can be used to fling certain items swallowed by it, hit outcroppings to dislodge objects, or trigger switches.

== Plot ==
Human Mira works for her friend BK, a raccoon, at the local donut shop in Donut County. She finds BK more interested in a new mobile app, trying to earn enough points for a quadcopter drone, which he does by scheduling the delivery of donuts to the residents of Donut County. However, Mira discovers that it's not donuts being sent by the app, but actual holes that have been consuming the homes and residents of Donut County.

BK refuses to acknowledge he did anything wrong, and when he receives his quadcopter, Mira purposely destroys it and then orders a donut to the shop, swallowing it up as well. They join the other residents trapped underground, and they all try to reason with BK that what he did was wrong. They come to learn that this was part of the plan of BK's boss, the Trash King, to acquire more trash. The Trash King and other raccoons developed the app to swallow all the trash they could find, ignoring the whims of the people that lived there.

Mira and BK launch a mission to stop the Trash King. As Mira uses a hole to wreak havoc within the raccoon's facilities, BK tries to convince the Trash King to stop what he is doing. The Trash King tempts BK with a lucrative position, while sending a giant quadcopter to fight off Mira. BK rejects the offer and races out to help hack the quadcopter and destroy it, destroying the raccoons' facilities as well. BK agrees to help return all the people of Donut County back to the surface.

== Development ==
You play the role of a hole, you must move around an environment making certain elements fall into correct targets at the right time.

— Peter Molydeux, a Peter Molyneux parody Twitter account, January 5, 2012

Indie game developer Ben Esposito worked on Donut County in his free time while developing The Unfinished Swan. The core game concept was prompted by a game jam based on video game pitches from a Peter Molyneux parody Twitter account, Peter Molydeux. Esposito made a game called The Pits from a pitch wherein the player moves a hole around an environment. The game grew to work as a "reverse Katamari": instead of a ball that expands upon touching items, as in Katamari Damacy, the Donut County hole expands upon swallowing items. Esposito described the game as a "whimsical physics toy".

Donut County was originally called Kachina, based on the Native American "spirit beings that personify nature". Esposito was inspired by the design of Hopi doll sculptures. Following a blog post that expressed criticism of his treatment of Hopi culture, and his subsequent effort to make an "authentic game" that incorporated the culture, he decided to change the title and abandon the theme. Donut County also took inspiration from indie game Windosill's art style, Los Angeles's high density of doughnut shops, and locations from Bruce Springsteen songs, such as Asbury Park and the New Jersey Turnpike.

A demo of the game was featured at IndieCade in October 2012. Its goal was to knock the sun out of the sky by regurgitating objects once swallowed by the hole. Polygon's Michael McWherter noted that while some of its levels felt aimless or more like an "experiment" or "interactive toy", others "showed puzzle-like potential", including a level where chickens needed to cross a road. Rock, Paper, Shotgun reported that a presentation of the game at the GDC 2013 Experimental Gameplay Workshop made the audience "cheer and applaud in delight". The game was expected to show at the Austin, Texas, Fantastic Arcade event in September 2014. In March 2015, Esposito presented on the game's development at the 2015 GDC.

Donut County was released on August 28, 2018, for iOS, macOS, PlayStation 4, and Windows platforms, and for Nintendo Switch and Xbox One on December 18, 2018. Annapurna Interactive has announced an upcoming physical edition of the game.

== Reception ==
Donut County

Aggregate score
Aggregator	Score
Metacritic	(iOS) 83/100 (NS) 79/100 (PC) 77/100 (PS4) 75/100 (XONE) 87/100

Review scores
Publication	Score
Destructoid	8/10
Edge	7/10
Electronic Gaming Monthly	2/5
Game Informer	7.5/10
GameRevolution	4.5/5
GameSpot	6/10
GamesRadar+	4/5
Gamezebo	3/5
Hardcore Gamer	4.5/5
IGN	7.8/10
Nintendo Life	6/10
Nintendo World Report	7/10
PlayStation Official Magazine – UK	7/10
PC Gamer (US)	83/100
Pocket Gamer	4.5/5
Push Square	7/10
The Guardian	3/5
TouchArcade	5/5
USgamer	4/5

Donut County received "generally favorable reviews" according to review aggregator Metacritic on all platforms. Cam Shea, writing for IGN praised the charming narrative and world of the game. Ashley Oh of Polygon appreciated the novel challenges that each level brought to the table. Philippa Warr, writing for PC Gamer praised the world design and the game's Trashopedia.

=== Awards ===
During development, the game was a 2015 Independent Games Festival finalist in the Excellence in Visual Art category, and an honorable mention in the Seumas McNally Grand Prize category.

Donut County won Apple's app store "iPhone game of the year" for 2018.

Year	Award	Category	Result	Ref.
2015	Independent Games Festival Awards	Excellence in Visual Art	Nominated	
2017	Game Critics Awards	Best Independent Game	Nominated	
2018	Golden Joystick Awards	Mobile Game of the Year	Nominated	
2018	The Game Awards 2018	Best Mobile Game	Nominated	
2018	The Game Awards 2018	Best Debut Indie Game	Nominated	
2018	Gamers' Choice Awards	Fan Favorite Indie Game	Nominated	
2019	New York Game Awards	Off Broadway Award for Best Indie Game	Nominated	
2019	Guild of Music Supervisors Awards	Best Music Supervision in a Video Game	Nominated	
2019	22nd Annual D.I.C.E. Awards	Portable Game of the Year	Nominated	
2019	SXSW Gaming Awards	Excellence in Design	Nominated	
2019	SXSW Gaming Awards	Mobile Game of the Year	Won	
2019	Game Developers Choice Awards	Best Mobile Game	Nominated	
2019	15th British Academy Games Awards	Debut Game	Nominated	
2019	15th British Academy Games Awards	Mobile Game	Nominated	
2019	Italian Video Game Awards	Best Mobile Game	Nominated	
2019	2019 Webby Awards	Best Game Design	Nominated	

== Legacy ==
French mobile game company Voodoo released Hole.io in 2018. Hole.io features many similar mechanics to Donut County, and Voodoo has been criticized for developing a "clone" of Donut County. Factors in Hole.io's similarities to Donut County were called into question when Hole.io hit #1 on the App Store, with Polygon directly calling Hole.io a "Donut County lookalike". Donut County creator Ben Esposito directly called Hole.io a "cheap clone" via Twitter, saying that Hole.io's "core mechanic" being stolen from Donut County trailers. In a statement to CBC, Voodoo said that "our developers, whether internal or external... freely interpret existing gameplays as it is the custom throughout the profession where all developers feed off each other's creations... for instance, Donut County and Hole.io are two games with similar gameplay but with different interpretations that each bring a unique game experience". Kotaku also criticized Voodoo for its surplus of "free mobile game(s) that ape the unique gameplay mechanics of a beloved indie", Hole.io included.
