= Peter Molydeux =

Twitter parody account

Peter Molydeux is a Twitter account presented as a parody of the game designer Peter Molyneux. Created by game artist Adam Capone in 2009, it posts audacious game design ideas in the style of Molyneux. The account presents Molyneux as a tragicomic character with unrelenting, creative ideas that are continually received with an apathetic audience. Over time, the account evolved from a Molyneux-based persona into a list of potential game concepts. A common theme of the tweets is the untapped potential of emotional game experiences. Molyneux came to appreciate the parody, and has since met Capone in person.

The account went viral in 2011 and led to the reinvigoration of Molyneux's legacy. To many, the two became entwined. Molyneux's reputation as a dreamer was reclaimed as a positive trait in light of growing opposition to conservative game design, and the parody account became a mouthpiece for that population. The tweets contributed to Molyneux's decision to leave Microsoft Game Studios and pursue riskier game ideas. They also inspired a game jam, in which about 1,000 game developers worldwide created about 300 games based on the tweets over the course of a weekend. The game jam also brought Molyneux fame within a burgeoning indie game movement. Notable games based on the parody account's ideas include Donut County. Capone retired the character and Twitter account in January 2026.

== History ==
I imagined him going through the supermarket with a digital recorder and coming up with ideas while shopping ... And over dinner, he's rearranging his peas and saying. 'Is this giving me a game idea?' And his wife is saying, 'Shut up, Peter. Just eat your food.'

— Capone (Molydeux) on Molyneux

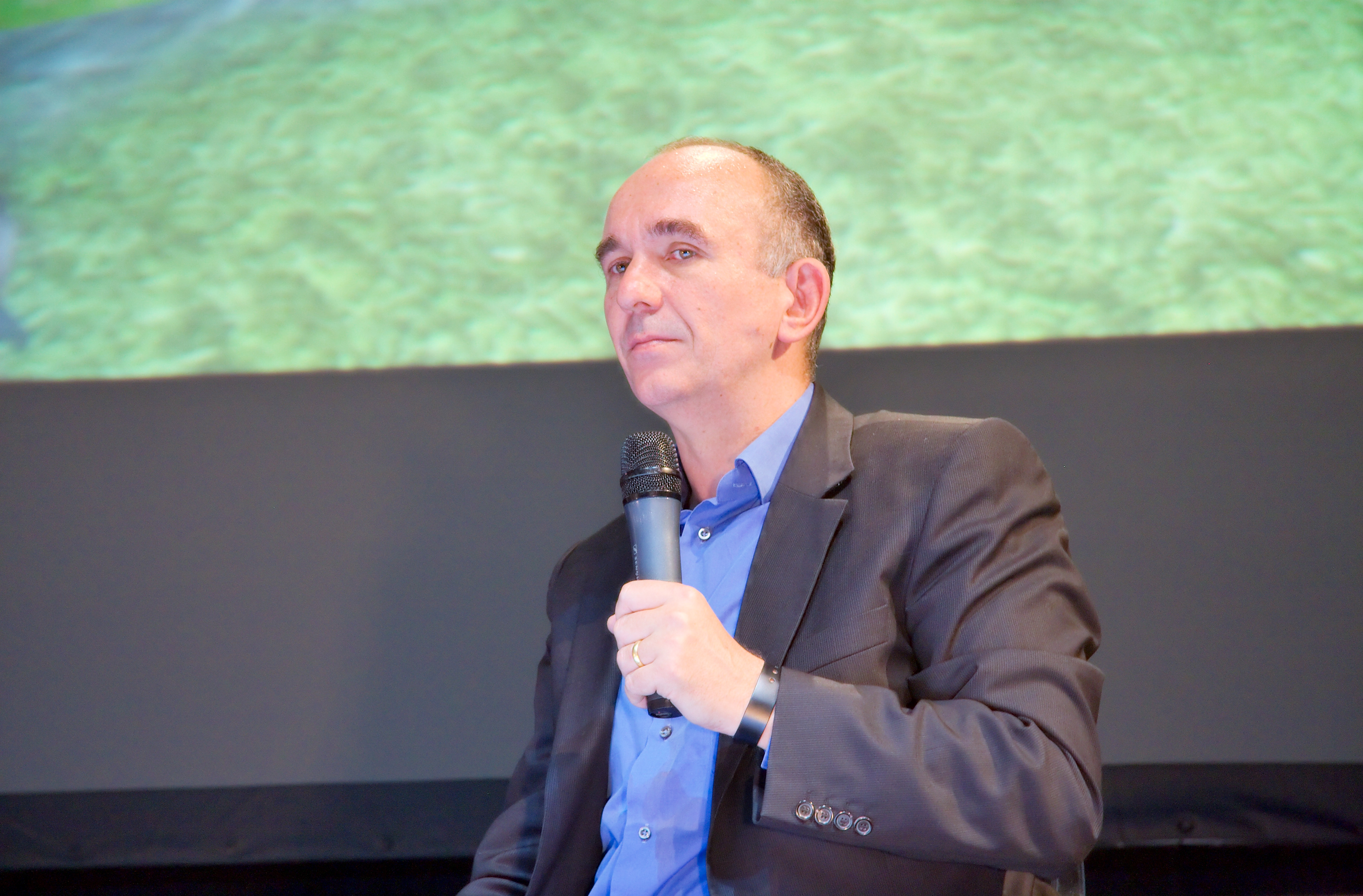
Game designer Peter Molyneux, the subject of the parody

In June 2009, Adam Capone created a Twitter account, @PeterMolydeux, as a parody of the game designer Peter Molyneux and the audacious game design ideas for which he was known. The account became a touchpoint for people in the game industry interested in more adventurous game concepts. Capone was inspired by Molyneux's games in his youth, particularly by the open choice structure of the 1994 simulation game Theme Park. Capone, a game artist who worked on titles including Gears of War, Kinectimals, and Saints Row, thought that Molyneux's ambition outweighed his propensity for overstatement, and appreciated the game designer's moxie in an industry known for safe ideas. Capone viewed Molyneux as a tragicomic character: full of creative ideas that are continually received by an unkind or indifferent audience. Capone did not expect the parody account to last long, but he became drawn to the persona. The parody's content came to Capone "naturally" from games, game podcasts, and game news websites. He liked that he was able to give away his ideas—good and bad—while actual game designers must protect their ideas and implement them before others.

The account's early tweets mocked Project Milo, a game Molyneux had introduced at the 2009 Electronic Entertainment Expo days before Capone began to tweet. The original persona's content was modeled on previous Molyneux speeches. After exhausting Milo and Project Natal material, Capone tweeted clever game design concepts in Molyneux's signature hyperbolic style. Capone found that the format had currency with his account's followers. An underlying theme of these proposals is the untapped potential of emotional game experiences, as the tweets ask followers to imagine games that cross over into real life. He later added a "Retrodeux" series, which proposes bold updates for classic games, and video content. Other characters appear in the parody tweets, including mock family members and interns. Capone made Cliff Bleszinski into an adversarial foil for his parody character: A game designer who is young, trendy, and supportive of the type of games Molyneux would hate. Capone views his persona as satirical caricature and is mindful of industry politics, especially when some mistake him for Molyneux. Once Capone reached 10,000 followers, he set a goal of overtaking Molyneux's own follower count.

The parody account is in contact with its namesake. Microsoft's press department first introduced Peter Molyneux to his parody account in mid-2011. The game designer was first annoyed at the caricature's "pathetic" and impotent demeanor, but came to regard the parody as clever, creative, and admirable. The account reminded Molyneux of his energy earlier in his career, and helped convince him to leave Microsoft and pursue another audacious game design idea. Free of restrictions on press activity, Molyneux contacted Capone's parody account upon leaving Microsoft. The two met later in person at Molyneux's new studio.

As Capone's account grew in popularity throughout 2011, it became a mouthpiece for thousands of dissatisfied game developers who sought greater variety in mainstream games. The Twitter account's growth was spurred by coverage in video game media. It had 23,000 followers by the end of 2011. The first Flash game based on one of his ideas was created in October 2011. Capone said that Goodbye, My Love ironically "used the most dated gameplay out there" despite his tweet's intention "to inspire an incredibly innovative game". Twitter briefly closed the account near the end of 2011 as an impersonation rather than a parody account, but soon reversed its actions.

In March 2012, multiple followers of the account began to plan a Molydeux game jam, an event in which game developers would create a game based on one of Molydeux's tweets over the course of a weekend. Capone supported the effort but limited his participation to the creation of a promotional video. The event, known then as What Would Molydeux? and later as Molyjam, soon grew from a San Francisco-based affair into an international, multisite event with satellite locations in the Netherlands, New York City, and Melbourne in 32 total locations. The event was held the weekend of March 30, and around 1,000 attendees made around 300 games, of which Capone found 15 games interesting. Professional cameos included David Hellman (Braid) in San Francisco and Peter Molyneux himself in London, where he gave an uncharacteristically fiery keynote speech that encouraged developers to "innovate ... come together and do crazy things". While most games tended to consist of normal game mechanics underneath a bizarre concept, Wired said that their inability to deliver on their promise was the jam's "most Molyneuxian touch".

Later that year, Capone created a trailer for one of Molyneux's upcoming games. Molyneux found the parody "truly amazing". In 2013, the parody account proposed a game design school that would emphasize "enlightenment" over marketability and other attributes he attributed to existing game design schools.

Capone retired the character and Twitter account in January 2026.

== Content ==
Some examples of the parody account's proposals include:

- A racing game in which the player controls the road instead of the vehicle
- A Kinect game in which the player must cry to open a gate
- An eight-person online multiplayer game in which each player controls one leg of an octopus
- The final segment of a war game, in which the player pauses in silence at the tombstone of each KIA recruit
- A 3D adventure game in which the amnesiac player awakens in a museum with a room dedicated to each year of the character's life
- The player holds a radioactive baby, which acts as a torch in a dark environment; rocking the baby increases its luminescence
- The player pretends to be blind and must walk into objects to avoid suspicion
- A bear must hug people in order to live, but crushes the people he hugs
- A pigeon carries sentimental objects to businessmen to persuade them not to kill themselves
- A divorced father sneaks into his family house to help with chores without alerting them
- When the player kills henchmen in one game, the player sees recurring images of those henchmen's crying children in an unrelated sports video game
- A version of Street Fighter in which streets fight other streets

== Reception ==
After two years, the account went viral in 2011. While Capone remained anonymous, games journalists, such as Kotaku and GameSetWatch, began to cover his tweets and journalists, such as Leigh Alexander (Gamasutra) and Patrick Klepek (Giant Bomb), reposted his content. Journalists did not view the parody as a mockery but instead as representative of a growing dissatisfaction over clichéd trends in the mainstream games industry. In this way, the account led to greater respect for Molyneux's temerity. Kotaku wrote that Capone's account displayed uncharacteristic creativity on his part, but Capone countered by saying that most game designers have endless game ideas and that real skill rests in applying them well.

The Twitter account also reinvigorated Molyneux's legacy. The tweets established Molyneux as a "grand dreamer" and precipitated his Molyjam keynote address, which made Molyneux into a "patron saint of the indie game movement". They also affected Molyneux's own life course as he decided to leave his creative director position at Microsoft Games Studios. Wired suggested that Molyneux's first game after leaving the company, Curiosity, could itself be based on a tweet from the parody account. Kotaku wrote that the statements of Molyneux and Molydeux are "often ... indistinguishable". The Twitter account inspired the Molyjam game jam, which was also pivotal in Molyneux's legacy. Wired wrote that his Molyjam keynote speech channeled the parody account while only a month earlier, Molyneux had been promoting the next Fable game. A second game jam based on quotes from Molyneux himself took place in July 2013.

Cassandra Khaw of USgamer wrote that Molydeux has a track record of making avant-garde and strange concepts come to life. One Molyjam title, Donut County, was developed into a commercial product and released in 2018. Its core premise is a "reverse Katamari" in which the player moves a hole in the ground, which expands upon swallowing items. Eurogamer wrote that the Twitter account continued the tradition of previous Molyneux spoofs, such as a quest in Fable 2 that imitated an idiosyncratic tree-growing mechanic from its predecessor. As of 2012, Capone's account had cornered the market.
