= Games Convention (disambiguation) =

Games Convention is an annual video gaming event in Leipzig, Germany.

Game convention (and variants) may refer to:

- Gaming convention, a multiple-day tabletop games gathering
- Gamescom, an annual video game trade fair held in Cologne, Germany
- GCA Games Convention Asia, a video game exhibition held in Singapore from 2007 to 2009

== See also ==
- List of gaming conventions
