= Fantasy Map Simulator =

2024 video game

- Developer: The Stranger
- Publisher: The Stranger
- Platform: Windows
- Release: September 4, 2024
- Genres: God game, sandbox
- Mode: Single-player

Fantasy Map Simulator is a real-time strategic sandbox simulator video game developed and published by The Stranger, released on Steam on September 4, 2024 for Microsoft Windows in early access. The game is based around controlling and editing a map of imaginary world with various political structures and physical environments.

== Gameplay ==
In game, the player manipulates with a handdrawn-styled procedurally generated world map with its own countries, nations, and diplomacy. The nations can expand, rebel against their governments, form alliances, or enter into a truce. Each government in the game has certain characteristics, such as what its economy is based on, corruption levels, what religion does majority follow and how the country sees its neighbours. The player can completely control actions of the nations, starting wars or making alliances, "possessing" any selected country.

The game allows to enter a "desktop mode" where the player can watch the game process on their desktop directly, without the ability to influence events on the map.

== Reception ==
Described as a "grand strategy" game, it distinguishes itself by placing maps at the very core of play, a feature unique to the genre. Despite the game being in early access, it received over 85% positive reviews on Steam and was described as "a great way to relax and meditatively watch over what's happening on the screen".
