= Richard Evans (AI researcher) =

British artificial intelligence researcher

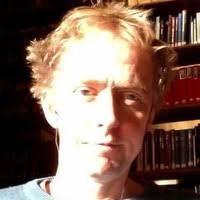
- Richard Evans, Oxford, 2016.
- Education: Imperial College London Cambridge University
- Known for: AI Research Black & White The Sims 3
- Website: www.imperial.ac.uk/people/r.evans14

Richard Evans (born 23 October 1969) is an artificial intelligence (AI) research scientist at DeepMind. His research focuses on integrating declarative interpretable logic-based systems with neural networks, and on formal models of Kant's Critique of Pure Reason.

Previously, he designed the AI for a number of computer games. He was the co-founder, along with Emily Short, of Little Text People, developing real-time multiplayer interactive fiction. Little Text People was acquired by Linden Lab in January 2012 for an undisclosed sum. At EA/Maxis, he was the AI lead on The Sims 3. He also designed and implemented the AI for Black & White, for which he received a number of awards.
