= Minutiae (app) =

Photographic art project and app

minutiae
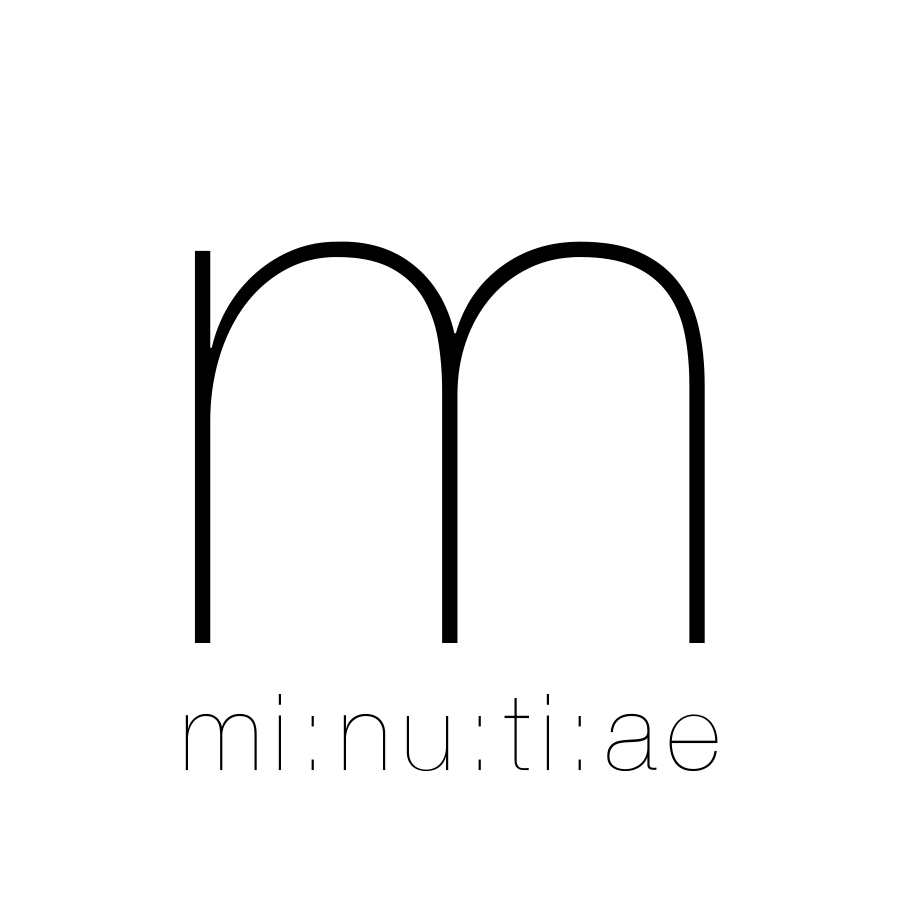
- Developer: minutiae LLC
- Release: 2017; 9 years ago
- Operating system: iOS, Android
- Type: Photography, Conceptual art
- License: Proprietary
- Website: minutiae-app.org

minutiae is an anonymous photography app and conceptual art project created by Martin Adolfsson and Daniel J Wilson. The app prompts all participants simultaneously, once per day at a randomly selected minute, to photograph whatever is in front of them. The project spans 1,440 days, corresponding to the number of minutes in 24 hours.

== History ==
The concept was developed in 2014 by Martin Adolfsson and Daniel J Wilson while participating in NEW INC, the New Museum's art and technology incubator in New York City. The project received funding from Konstnärsnämnden, the Swedish Arts Grants Committee. The project was presented at art book fairs in London, New York, Los Angeles between 2015 and 2017 before launching as a mobile app in 2017.

From December 2023 to March 2024, minutiae was featured in a participatory exhibit at the Centre Pompidou in Paris.

In May 2025, Columbia University Libraries announced the acquisition of the minutiae archival collection, described as among the first archives of a mobile application to enter an academic library. The collection comprises a bespoke version of the app loaded onto an iPhone containing the complete 1,440-day photo cycles of eleven participants, a physical book version of one participant's complete cycle, oral history interviews with the creators, and the underlying source code held in a restricted repository.

== Reception ==
Upon its launch, minutiae received coverage from technology and culture publications. Wired described it as "the curious app that captures your unfiltered life." Vice covered it as an "anti-social media app for sharing your mundane moments." Hyperallergic described it as a "follower-free app" offering "an intimate view into a random stranger's life." The Times described it as an app that "marvels at the mundane."

The Financial Times covered the app twice, with technology correspondent Tim Bradshaw writing about it at launch in 2017 as an "antidote to Instagram and Facebook," and again in 2021 after completing his own 1,440-day cycle, calling the result "a document of my existence unlike any I would otherwise photograph, let alone post on Instagram."

The app also received coverage in the Süddeutsche Zeitung, El Mundo, Göteborgs-Posten, and Dagens Industri.

== See also ==
- BeReal
- 1 Second Everyday
