= Black & White 2 =

2005 video game

- Developer: Lionhead Studios (Note: Ported to Mac OS X by Robosoft Technologies.)
- Publisher: Electronic Arts (Note: Published for Mac OS X by Feral Interactive.)
- Designers: Peter Molyneux; Ron Millar
- Programmers: David Bryson; Daniel Deptford; Tid Cooney
- Artists: Jamie Galipeau; Paul McLaughlin; Christian Bravery; Jon Eckersley
- Writer: James Leach
- Composer: Craig Beattie
- Platforms: Windows, Mac OS X
- Release: Windows: NA: 4 October 2005; EU: 7 October 2005; AU: 16 October 2005; Mac OS X: NA: 6 January 2009
- Genres: Real-time strategy, god game
- Mode: Single-player

Black & White 2 is a video game developed by Lionhead Studios and published by Electronic Arts released in October 2005. It is the sequel to 2001's Black & White. A Mac OS X port was released in January 2009, and released for download via the Mac App Store in November 2014. The game blends real-time strategy and god game elements.

== Gameplay ==
The player takes the role of a god called from the void (nothingness) to help the villagers who invoked them. The player must help develop their nature according to their good or evil desires. The player is physically represented in the world as an avatar-like creature, which takes the form of a giant anthropomorphic ape, lion, wolf, turtle, cow, or tiger. The creature can grow to an immense size, and adopt a good or evil persona based on how the player rewards or punishes their actions. In addition to the god simulation and city-building elements introduced in the original Black & White, Black & White 2 also features elements of real-time strategy gameplay, with the addition of controllable warfare and fighting units.

Black & White 2 features a more conventional heads-up display (HUD) system than its predecessor. Rather than the experimental HUD-less gameplay seen in the original game, Black & White 2 features HUD notifications that inform players of their creature's state of mind, the effects of their actions on their creature, the status of villages, etc. The user interface is almost button-less. The player sees little else on the screen but the world, the player's hand, and toolbars which the player can make disappear.

The only way the player can directly interact with this world is through the player's hand, which can be used to pick up people, trees, and food. It can also directly push and pull objects on the ground, allowing the player to directly participate in combat in a limited way. The player can also cast miracles for a certain amount of "Prayer Power" (in essence, "Mana"), which comes from the player's believers.

Two creatures battling in the Greek city.

To do things such as cast miracles, the player moves the hand in such a way to make a symbol on the ground, referred to as a gesture. This activates the miracle, and if the player has enough Prayer Power, it appears in the player's hand ready to cast. Miracles have a variety of different uses. There are six ordinary miracles: fire, lightning, water, shield, heal, and meteor, (each of which can be thrown or poured), and four epic wonders miracles: siren, hurricane, earthquake, and volcano, which require their respective epic wonder building to be charged and cast.

Black & White 2 can be played in three ways: Good, Evil, or a combination of the two. Evil involves the use of fear, torture, conquest and destruction using armies along with the creation of buildings such as a pit of torture. Good involves benevolence, more positive city building, and looking after the populace, particularly defending it from attacks. Both of these require ore and wood, of which there is a limited amount.

The player's tribe is the Greeks. Other tribes include Egypt, Norse, Aztec, and Japanese.

As in Black & White, players can create disciples to do the player's job in certain areas of the game while the player tends to other business. For example, if the player needs to lead an invasion, they can set villagers, and even their creature to farm for them while they lead an invasion.

=== Creatures ===
The player can choose between several creatures, including the ape, lion, wolf, cow and tiger, although the tiger is not available in the base game. The player's creature can do most things the player can do, such as cast miracles. Since the player trains the creature, their personality can become whatever the player makes of it. Each tribe, like the player, owns creatures at some stage. As the game progresses, the enemies' creatures increase in strength and size. Unlike Black & White, in which the creature had to be taught miracles through repetition, Black & White 2 allows the player to 'buy' creature miracles with 'Tribute' currency. Along with this, Black & White 2 allows the player to revisit everything they've taught their creature in order to alter and fine-tune it at any time, while the original Black & White only allowed changes to be made as the creature repeated an action.

== Plot ==
The player comes upon a scene of a Greek city being devastated by a huge Aztec army after being summoned from a "pure prayer". After the player saves a certain number of people, their people are transported to a new land with a handful of refugee worshipers, the player must re-establish a power base from which to eventually defeat the Aztec empire. To do so, the player must conquer the Norse, the Japanese and the Aztecs, either by peace or war. Throughout the game there is a theme of "The prophecy", which states that a tribe will be destroyed by the mightiest power in the world but will receive a god who will lead them to glory and dominance of the world.

The good and evil advisors return, both once again voiced by Marc Silk, except there were some significant cosmetic changes for the good advisor - now making use of the more recent graphical capabilities available for his beard and hair.

== Reception ==
Reception

Aggregate score
Aggregator	Score
Metacritic	75/100

Review scores
Publication	Score
Edge	7/10
Eurogamer	6/10
Game Informer	8.5/10
GamePro	3.5/5
GameSpot	8.2/10
GameSpy	3.5/5
GameTrailers	8.6/10
GameZone	9/10
IGN	8.8/10
PC Gamer (US)	83%
The Sydney Morning Herald	3.5/5

The game received "generally favorable reviews" according to video game review aggregator Metacritic.

Black & White 2 received a "Silver" sales award from the Entertainment and Leisure Software Publishers Association (ELSPA), indicating sales of at least 100,000 copies in the United Kingdom.

== Expansion pack ==
An expansion pack, Black & White 2: Battle of the Gods, was released in April 2006. It includes a new creature, new lands, miracles, enemies, challenges and the tiger from the Black & White 2 Special Edition. The premise involves the player's return to Eden, where they discover that the Aztecs have raised their own evil deity which must be confronted head-on for control of the land. The player may choose how they will challenge this new god, either by countering the evil deity's actions with good deeds, or attempting to defeat through evil actions.
