= Chatroulette =

Chat website

- Website type: Online chat, voice chat, video chat
- Available in: English
- Owner: Andrey Ternovskiy
- Creator: Andrey Ternovskiy
- CEO: Andrew William Done
- Website: chatroulette.com
- Commercial: Yes
- Registration: Not required
- Launched: November 16, 2009; 17 years ago
- Current status: Active

Chatroulette is an online chat website that pairs random users with a choice between two other users for webcam-based conversations. Visitors to the website begin an online chat (audio and video) with another visitor. At any point, either user may leave the current chat by initiating another random connection.

In February 2010, a few months after the website was created, about 35,000 people were on Chatroulette at any given time. Around the beginning of March, creator Andrey Ternovskiy estimated the site to have around 1.5 million users. According to a survey carried out by RJMetrics in 2010, about one in eight spins on Chatroulette yielded "R-rated" content. Parody shows such as The Daily Show and South Park have lampooned this aspect of the service, and nudity has become an established part of the site's notoriety.

In spring 2020, Ternovskiy appointed Andrew William Done, Australian tech entrepreneur, as the CEO of Chatroulette. Done previously founded IT consultancy Simple Machines in Sydney, Australia, and before Chatroulette was CTO for rental platform Goodlord in London. Following product changes in spring 2020, and enhanced by the COVID-19 pandemic, Chatroulette's user numbers have more than doubled between 2019 and 2020.

== Overview ==
The Chatroulette website was created by Andrey Ternovskiy, a 17-year-old high-school student in Moscow, Russia. Ternovskiy says the concept arose from video chats he used to have with friends on Skype, and that he wrote the first version of Chatroulette in "two days and two nights". Ternovskiy chose the name "Chatroulette" after watching The Deer Hunter, a 1978 film set in the Vietnam War in which prisoners of war are forced to play Russian roulette.

Ternovskiy built the site on an old computer he had in his bedroom. The site initially had 20 users, and then it doubled daily for a period, according to Ternovskiy in 2010. He discusses that he did not advertise or post his site anywhere; in fact, people starting talking about the website and knowledge of it gradually spread by word of mouth. As the number of active users grew, Ternovskiy has had to rewrite the entire code to cope with the load, the management of which is the most challenging part of his project. Despite the expansion of the service, he still codes everything on his own. Ternovskiy sought help from his longtime friend Vlad Kostanyan, who helped him with his side projects.

In early November 2009, shortly after the site launched, it had 500 visitors per day. One month later there were 50,000. The site has been featured in The New York Times, The New Yorker, New York magazine, and on Good Morning America, Newsnight in the United Kingdom, Tosh.0, and The Daily Show with Jon Stewart. In February 2010, about 35,000 people were on Chatroulette at any given time. Around the beginning of March 2010, Ternovskiy estimated the site to have around 1.5 million users, around 33% of them from the United States and 5% from Germany.

An early growth phase was funded by a $10,000 investment from Ternovskiy's parents, which he soon paid back. As of March 2010, Ternovskiy was running the site from his childhood bedroom, assisted by four programmers who were working remotely, and the site was supported through advertising links to an online dating service. The site uses several high-end servers all located in Frankfurt, Germany.

In June 2010, Ternovskiy was awarded by Webby for excellence on the Internet.

According to the New York Times, the site is intensely addictive. One informal study published in March 2010 showed that nearly half of all Chatroulette "spins" connected a user with someone in the US, while the next most likely country was France, with 15%. On average, in sessions showing a single person 89% of these were male and 11% were female; 8% of spins showed multiple people behind the camera. About one in three females appeared as such a group, and one in 12 males. A user was more likely to encounter a webcam featuring no person at all than one featuring a sole female. About one in eight spins yielded someone apparently naked, exposing themselves, or engaging in a sexual act. A user was twice as likely to encounter a sign requesting female nudity than to encounter actual female nudity.

Initially, the site only asked users to confirm that they are at least 18 years old and agree on terms to not broadcast any offensive or pornographic content. Login or registration was not required. However, the website now requires users to register for free before they can use the features of the website. The signup requires a username, email address, and password. Details such as age, gender, and location can be further added under profile and settings. This tab also allows users to write an 'about me' section about themselves, including languages they speak and their taste in music, movies, and games. Users can also upload an image of themselves to add to their profiles.

== Inappropriate content ==
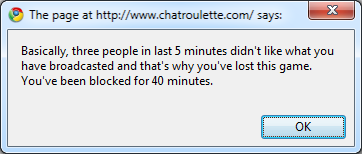
Alert message shown after the user has been reported three times

Within a year of the site's launch, Chatroulette received criticism, particularly with respect to the offensive, obscene, or pornographic material that some users of this site were exhibiting. Television personality Keith Ablow advised, "Parents should keep all their children off the site because it's much too dangerous for children. It's a predator's paradise. This is one of the worst faces of the Internet that I've seen. It's disconnecting human relationships rather than connecting them." (Ablow's license to practice medicine in Massachusetts was suspended in 2019, with the Massachusetts Board of Registration in Medicine alleging he had "engaged in sexual activity and boundary violations with multiple patients", among other misbehaviors.) Emie Allen, president of the National Center for Missing and Exploited Children, told CBS' The Early Show that the site was the "last place parents want their kids to be. This is a huge red flag; this is extreme social networking. This is a place kids are going to gravitate to."

Ternovskiy told the New York Times that "Everyone finds his own way of using the site. Some think it is a game, others think it is a whole unknown world, others think it is a dating service. I think it's cool that such a concept can be useful for so many people. Although some people are using the site in not very nice ways -- I am really against it." CNN reported in 2010 that users of the site would frequently be connected with people who were naked or masturbating in front of the camera. They also claimed the majority of the site's users were male and overwhelmingly young, and people in their 30s would be mocked on the site for their age. The CNN reporter also encountered users dressed in costumes, playing music, or hosting dance parties. In 2011, artists Eva and Franco Mattes presented random Chatroulette users with a staged view of a man who had apparently hanged himself, and recorded the reactions.

According to a survey carried out by RJMetrics, about one in eight of feeds from Chatroulette involved "R-rated" content. Parody shows such as The Daily Show and South Park have lampooned this aspect of the service, and nudity has become an established part of the site's notoriety. A complicated legal environment surrounds Chatroulette with respect to the sexual activities that occur frequently on the site. These activities may be illegal, but who is liable for such content is uncertain due to the level of anonymity of the users.

=== Reaction to criticisms ===
In response, the website has discouraged under-18s from using the site, and prohibits "pornographic" behavior. Users who experience harassment or witness illegal, immoral, or pornographic activity may report the offending user. If three users complain about the same participant within five minutes, the user is temporarily banned from the service. In August 2012, Chatroulette removed the Safe Mode feature of the website, and posted new terms and conditions, stating that nudity was no longer allowed on any part of the site. Chatroulette later changed their terms of use, making it a requirement that all users sign up before using the service.

Early in the site's operation, an algorithm was developed to successfully filter out large quantities of obscene content on Chatroulette, considering that as much as 30% of the 8.5 million monthly unique visitors are under 18 years of age. This has led to a higher proportion of female users accessing the service due to the cleanup. The image recognition algorithms automatically flag users broadcasting sexual content. The filter works in a manner that it identifies excessive amounts of revealed skin while simultaneously recognizes faces as appropriate. A 20,000-user-based sample study proved that the algorithm is able to filter out nearly 60% of the offensive material along with ads on the site. While the video streams are transmitted in a peer-to-peer manner, without passing through the site's server, Chatroulette does periodically take screenshots of the users' video content. Humans then check the screenshots flagged by the algorithms and proceed to block the offending users for a period of time. In an interview, Ternovskiy states, "While recognition software improves, we have employed a moderation team to review pictures manually. We now have around 100 moderators who are all monitoring all webcam feeds and marking inappropriate ones. The combination of filter technology and moderation results in the banning of 50,000 inappropriate users daily."

In December 2020, Chatroulette reported using artificial intelligence company Hive to automatically flag inappropriate content in video streams.

== See also ==
- Omegle
- Stickam
