= Hole.io =

2018 arcade physics puzzle video game

- Developer: Voodoo
- Publisher: Voodoo
- Platforms: Android; iOS; Web browser; Xbox One; Xbox Series X/S; PlayStation 4; PlayStation 5; Windows; Nintendo Switch
- Release: 2018
- Genre: Arcade
- Mode: Single-player

Hole.io is a 2018 physics puzzle game with battle royale mechanics created by French studio Voodoo for Android and iOS.

Players control a hole in the ground that can move around the map. By consuming various objects, holes will increase in size, allowing players to consume larger objects as well as the smaller holes of other players.

Critics praised the game when it debuted, and it took the top spot in the free apps section on the App Store and on Google Play. Some critics however, characterized the game as a clone of the 2018 independent game Donut County. It has also been criticized for being promoted as a multiplayer game when the other "players" are likely computer-controlled NPCs.

== Gameplay ==
Hole.io combines several gameplay mechanics. In Classic mode, the player's objective is to become the largest hole by the end of a two-minute round by traveling around the area and consuming trees, humans, cars, and other objects which fall into the hole if appropriately sized. Gradually the hole becomes larger and capable of sucking in buildings and smaller holes. If an object is too big, it will not fall in and might block the way, preventing other objects from going through. Players need to utilize the game's real-time physics to their advantage and optimize their path for effective growth. Other holes can consume the player's hole, resulting in "death" and respawning several seconds later.

"Battle" mode is a battle royale mode that pits the player against multiple opponents with the goal of being the last hole standing. While players can still consume the environment, the goal is to eliminate all other holes.

In both Classic and "Battle" modes, players compete against computer-controlled NPCs rather than real-time multiplayer. Additionally, a solo mode exists, which allows players to play alone with the goal of consuming as close to 100% of the city as possible within two minutes. The simple mechanics of the game put it in the hyper-casual genre.

== Comparison to Donut County ==
Donut County is a 2018 independent video game that was in development for at least six years before its release on 28 August 2018, sparking allegations by that game's developer that Voodoo copied his idea. Both games use the same mechanic of a hole in the ground swallowing objects to grow bigger; however, Donut County additionally features a storyline and a cast of characters which Hole.io lacks. Conversely, Hole.io adds a cityscape. According to Variety, Hole.io's developer Voodoo's entire range of games consists of clones of other games. Voodoo managed to secure a $200 million investment from Goldman Sachs shortly after releasing Hole.io.

In an August 2018 interview, Donut County creator Ben Esposito remarked that developers like Voodoo who clone were on one side of the game making spectrum while he was on the other side coming up with new ideas.

== Release and reception ==
Soon after its release, Hole.io made it to the top of the free games section on the Apps Store and Google Play, receiving over 10 million downloads on Google Play alone.

While some reviewers criticized it for copying core mechanics of Donut County, others characterized the game as being "oddly satisfying and addictive".

In June 2024, the game was released on PlayStation 4, PlayStation 5, Nintendo Switch, Xbox Series X and S, Xbox One, and Windows.
