= Godus =

- Developer: 22cans
- Publishers: DeNA; 22cans (PC)
- Producers: Matt Jeffery; Jemma Harris
- Designer: Peter Molyneux
- Engine: Marmalade
- Platforms: Microsoft Windows; OS X iOS; Android; Fire OS
- Release: Windows, OS X 13 September 2013 (Early access) iOS; 7 August 2014; Android; 27 November 2014
- Genres: God game, strategy game
- Mode: Single-player

Godus is a god video game developed by 22cans and published by DeNA. The company launched a Kickstarter campaign to raise funds and met their funding goal on 20 December 2012. Godus was designed by Peter Molyneux, who described it as the spiritual successor to his earlier creation, Populous. A real-time strategy combat game spin-off, Godus Wars, was released in 2016. While the mobile versions of Godus continue to be updated, the PC editions of both games never left Steam Early Access, and are no longer available for purchase on the Steam store.

== Gameplay ==
The player starts out by saving a man and a woman from drowning. Once the player leads them to the Promised Land, they will settle down and build a tent on a square plot. One of two classes are created: Builders, who are reserved for constructing new abodes on plots, and Breeders, who exist to create more Followers. They will expand the settlement by breeding and building another tent to live in. By using this strategy, the player will explore the world and improve the population through the ages.

The main feature of this game is that the player is able to redesign the land stratum at will. Different strata require different amounts of "Belief", which operates like an in-game currency, to modify. The player will need to build more housing dwellings, which increases the population that worships the player.

As the population grows, the player will be rewarded with cards that will give access to more powers and grant new abilities and behaviours to the population, as well. Treasure chests found buried within the strata can unlock stickers used to grant the cards. Beacons found on the map are the main source of progression throughout the game, having to be burned in order to unlock new areas. More systems of in-game currency will be unlocked, such as wheat, which can build abodes, gems which have multiple purposes and can be purchased for real-life money, and ore, which is primarily for beacons.

Different sizes of abodes can be unlocked, and one of four settlements can be created: Farmers that produce wheat via. fields, Builders that construct more abodes, Miners that mine ore/cloudstone, and Shamans that collect resources from the environment. The larger an abode is, the more wheat is required to construct a house on it. Shortly after the first abodes are unlocked, shelters can no longer be constructed. Cards can unlock larger sizes, those being cabins, lodges, cottages, farmhouses, and manors. (Note: Names of cottages and lodges are reversed in the Overworld.)

The player encounters a civilization that existed before the game begins-the Astari. Once the Astari are formally introduced to the game, followers and the Astari compete on a scale: yellow being the happiest and red being the saddest. If the player's civilization is below the happiness of the Astari, any group between 1-5 followers will leave the player's civilization and join the Astari. If the player's civilization is above, the same applies for the Astari leaving their civilization and joining the player's. The player can take one of two paths: either destroy the Astari civilization and repopulate it with their own, or burn enough beacons to reach the Astari and send a follower there, reuniting both civilizations together.

The player is also able to unlock three other worlds; Weyworld, which is more inhospitable and requires more wheat for every plot of land, Upworld, which features a set of five challenges that the player must fix for the inhabitants of the islands, and Overworld, which replaces ore with cloudstone. The Astari are also found in Weyworld and Overworld. The player is capable of unlocking voyages to multiple islands, which upon completion grant a large amount of stickers and gems.

Upon unlocking enough stickers, the player gains access to the origins of the Astari: they were initially saved by another God before the player entered the game for the first time, expanding across the entire map and building a civilization. The Astari enter a civil war following a series of mistakes by God which caused natural disasters, but it is quelled. However, a gray material that prevents God from altering the strata begins to spread across the island, forcing the Astari into a small space in which they are confined to by the time the player arrives.

== Development ==
Godus was the effort of game designer Peter Molyneux and his development studio 22cans. The game is the spiritual successor to Molyneux's earlier creation, Populous, and is inspired by his other titles: Dungeon Keeper and Black & White. Molyneux left his position at Microsoft in March 2012 to found 22cans. With a staff of 20 people, the studio released its first game, Curiosity – What's Inside the Cube?, on 6 November 2012, and began working on Godus.

The company launched a Kickstarter campaign to help crowdfund the costs of producing the game, and the campaign met its funding goal of £450,000 (US$732,510) on 20 December 2012. Although the game was only funded two days before the campaign ended, any remaining pledges would be put towards stretch goals which would add features to the game such as more single-player modes, a cooperative mode, and adding support for Linux and the Ouya platform. 22cans planned to release a prototype of the game on 13 December 2012, in an effort to attract more backers to the campaign. At the close of the campaign, £526,563 (US$857,139) was raised and five out of the six stretch goals were reached, failing to achieve the goal for Linux and Ouya support. As of 21 December 2012, Molyneux had not set a release date for the game. As of 13 September 2013, Godus was released on Steam Early Access as a beta version.

A freemium iOS version of the game was released 7 August 2014, and the Android version was released on 27 November 2014.

With the end of 22cans' first game, Curiosity – What's Inside the Cube?, it was revealed that in Godus a single person will reign as the virtual god over all other players, with the ability to "intrinsically decide on the rules that the game is played by." It was also revealed that this same player will receive 1% of the revenue made by the game. As of February 2015, the winner Bryan Henderson had still not received the prize. In March 2017, Molyneux claimed that Godus had not made a profit and Henderson would not receive money.

In February 2015, 22cans switched focus to another title The Trail: Frontier Challenge, and the remaining Godus development team acknowledged that they "simply can't see us delivering all the features promised on the KickStarter page." Due to Molyneux's apparent abandonment of the project, contrary to his earlier enthusiasm, many fans requested refunds. Furthermore, fans frequently cited "disgraceful treatment" and blatant lying in association with Godus, and by extension Molyneux.

In February 2016, 22cans released a new early access game titled Godus Wars, a combat-focused, real-time strategy singleplayer game based on the original Godus. Godus Wars was made available at no additional cost to existing Godus owners. Simultaneously, it was offered as an independent product available for separate purchase. The purchase of Godus Wars also included Godus, while Godus still remained available on the Steam store. 22cans also announced they would continue development on Godus by adding multiplayer to Godus Wars, though this feature never came to fruition. Upon its release, Godus Wars also included micro-transactions for more content. In response to significant negative feedback from customers, 22cans CEO Simon Phillips responded and the studio removed the micro-transactions. The contract of the lead developer of the game, Konrad Naszynski, expired 28 June 2016, and it was reported that no one remained working on the PC version.

In a December 2021 interview, Molyneux stated that, "we are announcing our first new set of features for Godus in almost two years and that should be coming out before Christmas." The features were released in the form of a string of multiple updates between early 2022 and August 2025.

As of 14 December 2023, the game is no longer available for purchase as on Steam, but is still available on mobile devices.

== Controversy ==
=== Disputes over funding ===
Eurogamer's Tom Bramwell expressed concern that successful game designers were funding their projects using Kickstarter, stating:

"I'm looking at Kickstarter through the prism of Molyneux and Braben and Schafer and Fargo reaching out of their mansions and rattling their golden cups in my direction. They instantly put me in the mentality of a consumer [...] weighing up a pre-order against the potential fiction of their oft-broken pre-release promises. [...] It's not wrong because they are taking advantage of people – which may or may not be the case – but because this is absolutely not what Kickstarter is about."

PC Gamer expressed similar concern: "one wonders if Molyneux couldn't have handled his own funding". Molyneux responded, saying, "I don't see why I, with my background, should be precluded from [Kickstarter]. I made the choice when I left Microsoft to become a small developer again and to define myself like a small developer defines itself, and that is someone who takes unbelievable risks – foolish risks like releasing Curiosity and doing Kickstarter." Molyneux also said that he invested a lot of his own money into the development studio 22cans.

== Reception ==
Reception

Aggregate score
Aggregator	Score
Metacritic	60/100 (iPhone/iPad)

Criticisms were made over the freemium model chosen for the iOS version. Gamers and Kickstarter supporters have reacted negatively to the broken promises by Molyneux, and demands for refunds or apologies have not been met or addressed.
