= Hive (artificial intelligence company) =

American company

- Type: Private
- Industry: Artificial Intelligence
- Founders: Kevin Guo, Dmitriy Karpman
- Headquarters: San Francisco, California
- Website: thehive.ai

Hive is an American artificial intelligence company offering machine learning models via APIs to enterprise customers. Hive uses around 700,000 gig workers to train data for its models through its Hive Work app. One of Hive's major offerings is to provide automated content moderation services.

== Products ==
Hive is reported to have been engaged to provide content moderation services to social news aggregator Reddit, Giphy, BeReal, Donald Trump-affiliated social network Truth Social, and on online chat website Chatroulette. Parler, after its shutdown by content service providers in early 2021 due to a lack of content moderation, integrated with Hive and was allowed back in the App Store. Hive's content moderation models have been leveraged widely in the livestreaming industry, where the cost of human moderation is high.

Hive's models have also been used in events such as the Super Bowl and March Madness, and its contextual advertising models used by NBC Universal and Vevo.

Hive provides APIs to detect deepfakes and AI-generated artwork.

In early 2023, Hive released a free demo text classifier intended to detect AI-generated text. Mark Hachman at PC World rated Hive's classifier favorably and found it more reliable than OpenAI's AI text classifier.

== History ==
Hive was founded by Kevin Guo and Dmitriy Karpman, and in April 2021, announced $85M in new capital at a valuation of $2 billion.
