= Curiosity: What's Inside the Cube? =

Experimental video game

Curiosity – What's Inside the Cube?
- Icon of Curiosity: What's Inside the Cube? from the iOS App Store
- Developer: 22cans
- Publisher: 22cans
- Producer: Jemma Harris
- Designer: Peter Molyneux
- Programmers: Gary Leach; Tim Rance
- Platforms: iOS, Android
- Release: 6 November 2012
- Mode: Online multiplayer

Curiosity – What's Inside the Cube? was an experimental video game by Peter Molyneux's studio 22cans. Originally called Curiosity, the game was later renamed to avoid confusion with the Mars rover. The game consisted of a cube that was slowly destroyed by players, with the one player who first reached the centre of the cube promised a "life-changingly amazing" prize. The social experiment ended on 26 May 2013 and was won by Bryan Henderson from Edinburgh, Scotland. The game was met with controversy after the reward – a special role within 22cans' upcoming god game, Godus, and 1% of the revenue earned by that game – ended up being less "life-changing" than claimed, and ultimately nearly nonexistent due to the commercial failure of Godus.

== Background ==
Curiosity was a multiplayer social experiment. The game setting was a featureless and minimalist white room in the middle of which floated a giant cube made of billions of smaller cubes ("cubelets") and white, floating text across each layer, usually topic related (hashtag, notifications etc.), with small messages. Players tapped the cubelets to dig through the surface of each layer and reveal the next layer below. The goal was to reach the center and to discover what was inside the cube. Each layer, which had a distinct look or design, contained a clue as to what was in the centre of the cube. Each cubelet destroyed by a player awarded them coins. Coins could be spent on tools that temporarily enhanced the player's abilities, such as picks ranging from iron to steel to diamond that increased the number of cubelets destroyed with each tap, or firecrackers that could be laid on the cube in long strings to chain together explosions.

22cans added more gameplay mechanics as the players progressed through the cube. Version 2, released on 7 December, included three new features: Draw mode, Badgers and Golden Badgers, as well as a page graphing various statistics about the cube against time. In addition, Peter Molyneux suggested there may be more to the game than it would seem: "There is something we haven't told everybody about when you play the cube. When you play the cube you're also doing something else. You don't realise you're doing it. [...] You're not just doing things in the cube. You don't realise it but you're doing something in something else as well at the same time."

Peter Molyneux claimed that "what is inside the cube is life-changingly amazing by any definition". Critics stated that the game designer might be over-promising. When it was suggested to him that he should "tone down the enthusiasm", he responded: "I don't want to believe less in something. I want to make something that is worthy of the emotion behind it."

According to the statistics pages available in-game from version 2, as of 8 December the game had over three million users. 22cans did not anticipate such widespread interest in the game, and were not prepared to handle the extreme load, causing connectivity issues to persist from launch day to nearly a week afterwards.

The floating text across the layers usually carried the hashtag for this 'game experiment', #Curiosity, or short, informal messages from the staff.

== Release ==
The game was submitted to Apple's App Store on 28 September 2012. The game was intended to be released at 00:22 (12:22 AM) on 7 November 2012, but Apple released the game without the knowledge of 22cans early on 6 November.

The Android version was also released on 6 November. On launch day the application was unable to connect to the official server for the majority of users. Since its launch on Google Play, reviews were polarized with about a third of users rating 5 stars and two-thirds rating 1 star. Reviews consistently improved since version 2, which introduced 3 new gameplay features, was released on the Android store on 7 December.

The game was intended to be released for tablets and PCs, but by 9 November 2012 Molyneux revealed that due to the popularity of the game and the strain on 22cans' servers, the company would be unable to support a PC release without the help of a publisher. Curiosity was ultimately only available on mobile devices.

== Reception ==
Reception

Aggregate score
Aggregator	Score
Metacritic	52/100

Review scores
Publication	Score
Gamezebo	2.5/5 stars
MacLife	3.5/5 stars
Pocket Gamer	4.5/5 stars
TouchArcade	1/5 stars
Digital Spy	3/5 stars

The iOS version received "mixed or average" reviews according to the review aggregation website Metacritic.

== Layers ==
Each layer of the cube had a distinct look or design, usually alternating between photos and plain colours. Developers said the cube originally contained around 69 billion cubelets. As of April 2013, there were approximately 50 layers remaining, consisting of 3.6 billion cubelets. The last layer was removed and the cube completed on 26 May 2013.

== Completion ==
On 26 May 2013, 22cans and Peter Molyneux announced via Twitter that the last layer had been removed and the Cube had been opened, revealing the prize video to the winning player that had removed the final layer. The winner was identified as Edinburgh resident Bryan Henderson, who was given the option to either keep the knowledge of the contents of the cube to himself or share it with the public. Molyneux announced that Henderson opted to share the prize.

Prior to the game's completion, Molyneux regularly described the prize as "life-changing," though clarified it would not be "a huge mountain of cash [...] an amazing sports car [...] or Half-Life 3." According to the video 22cans posted on YouTube the day that the experiment ended, the cube awarded Henderson with the role of "god of gods" within 22cans' upcoming god game, Godus, and 1% of all of the revenue earned by Godus. Henderson's role within Godus would grant him the ability to reign over other players, with the ability to "intrinsically decide on the rules that the game is played by." In a 2012 interview with Rock Paper Shotgun, Molyneux declared the prize would last for five to ten years. After the revelation of the prize, Molyneux said the award would last six months, and that after six months, Henderson could be overthrown by other players in his 'god of gods' role. Over 18 months later, Henderson reported little to no contact from 22cans. Speaking to The Guardian, Molyneux explained that the person in charge of keeping in contact with Henderson left the company and no one was ever reassigned the position, an act which Molyneux called "inexcusable". In March 2017, Molyneux stated that Godus was not profitable and Henderson would therefore not receive money. As of 14 December 2023, Godus is no longer available for purchase on PC, never having left early access. The 'god of gods' role was never implemented and Henderson never received his due prize.

Upon learning about the controversy, indie publisher Devolver Digital and developer Roll7 decided to include Henderson as a non-playable character in their 2015 release Not a Hero.
