= BeReal =

French social media app released in 2020

- Original authors: Alexis Barreyat, Kévin Perreau
- Developer: Voodoo
- Release: 2020

Stable release(s)
- Android: 3.66.0 / 23 December 2025
- iOS: 4.55.0 / 2 January 2026
- Written in: Swift (iOS), Kotlin (Android)
- Platform: iOS 14 or later Android
- Available in: 13 languages
- List of languages English, Dutch, French, German, Hindi, Indonesian, Italian, Japanese, Korean, Portuguese, Simplified Chinese, Spanish, Swedish, Turkish
- Website: bereal.com

BeReal (stylized on the app logo as BeReal.) is a French social-networking app released in 2020, developed by Alexis Barreyat and Kévin Perreau. Currently, it is owned by Voodoo. Its main feature is a daily notification that encourages users to share photos of themselves in their day-to-day life, on any randomly selected two-minute window every day. Critics noted its emphasis on authenticity, which some felt crossed the line into the mundane. The primary reference of its name relates to its focus on users uploading unpolished photos, with it being a pun of the term B-reel.

According to the app's description on Apple's App Store, BeReal encourages its users to "show their friends who they really are, for once," by removing filters and opportunities to stage or edit photos.

After a couple of years of relative obscurity, it rapidly gained popularity in early and mid-2022 growing from 21.6 million to 73.5 million users between July and August, before experiencing a decrease in use in 2023 and continuing to decline to 23 million users at the beginning of 2024.

== History ==
The app was developed by Alexis Barreyat, a former employee at GoPro, and Kévin Perreau, a graduate from 42 in Paris. Initially released in 2020, it first gained widespread popularity in early 2022. It first spread widely on college campuses, partially due to a paid ambassador program. In late August 2022, the application had over 10 million active daily users and 21.6 million active monthly users. As of February 2023, the app has grown to 13 million active daily users and 47.8 million active monthly users.

In June 2021, BeReal received a $30 million funding round led by Andreessen Horowitz and Accel. In May 2022, BeReal secured $85 million in a funding round led by Yuri Milner's DST Global, increasing its valuation to about $600 million.

On July 25, 2022, BeReal topped Apple's free app list in the iOS App Store, and remained until September 2022. BeReal also received Apple's iPhone App of the Year in 2022.

By late spring 2023, the app's momentum was waning, as daily users dropped to about 6 million, from 15 million in October 2022.

In June 2024, BeReal was acquired by the French company Voodoo for a reported €500 million. During the transition, Alexis Barreyat stepped down as CEO, with Aymeric Roffé taking over.

== Features ==
Once per day, BeReal notifies all users that a two-minute window to post is open. It asks users to create a post (known eponymously as a "BeReal") which, using mandatory simultaneous photos and now short videos from both the front and back cameras, provides a visual depiction of what they are doing at that moment, with an option to caption their post. The given window varies from day to day, and is not known to users before the notification is received.

Once the daily notification is sent, users lose the ability to see others' BeReals from the previous day. Furthermore, users cannot see any of the current day's BeReals until they upload their own. On-time BeReals show the time it was uploaded, meanwhile, late BeReals uploaded after the two-minute window shows how late the BeReal was taken, but the user has to long-press the BeReal to reveal the time it was uploaded. Other users can also see how many attempts the poster took to take the BeReal, as well as their location when the BeReal was taken. Users only get one chance to delete their BeReal and post another one, and they used to not be able to post more than one at any time. However, in 2023, a feature was added that allowed users to post up to two extra BeReals on days when they posted their first BeReal within the 2-minute window. In July 2024, the number of bonus BeReals was increased to 5. BeReal also features a "Discovery" section, wherein users are given the option to share to a much wider, public audience. This feature, however, is limited, as users are not able to interact with the posts through commenting—unlike the "My Friends" feature. In August 2023, in an attempt to make BeReal more social, another feature was added so that users are now able to see their friends of friends' BeReal.

The app reportedly uses HiveAI to automate its image moderation process. However, there is also a report function that allows users to report a photo or another user if they are posting inappropriate content.

=== Comparison to other platforms ===
Its concept of prompting users to photograph their surroundings at a random daily time was preceded by minutiae, an anonymous photography project launched in 2014.

Because of its daily cycle of engagement, it has been compared to Wordle. It also supports a platform similar to Snapchat with a theme of impermanence and brevity.

BeReal has been described as designed to compete with Instagram while simultaneously de-emphasising social media addiction and overuse. The app does not allow any photo filters or other editing, and has no follower counts. Marketing material from the company said that the app "can be addictive" and that "BeReal won't make you famous." Jacob Arnott, managing director of social agency We the People, describes BeReal as "an anti-Instagram" due to its raw and unedited nature.

The app's foundation on friends rather than followers resembles Facebook's platform of adding friends, which comprise the content of a user's feed. This also resembles Instagram's "close friends" story feature. Further, rather than "liking" posts, BeReal uses "RealMojis" which involves taking a photo to interact with other posts.

With the popularity of BeReal, other providers have launched similar features. In July 2022, Instagram launched a "Dual Camera" feature similar to BeReal, and in August 2022 it began testing a feature called "IG Candid Challenges", where users are prompted to post once a day within two minutes. As of September 2022, TikTok has also launched a feature called TikTok Now, following the same concept.

In December 2022, similar to Spotify's "Wrapped," BeReal launched a feature involving a video of a compilation of users' BeReal posts of 2022. During the 2026 FIFA World Cup, BeReal temporarily allowed users to share unlimited posts instead of following its usual daily posting limit. The app also introduced notifications that encouraged users to capture their reactions when their selected national teams scored goals.

== User characteristics ==
BeReal is considered to be targeted towards Generation Z users, and attempts to minimise "social media fatigue", a feeling of numbness and disconnection from reality caused by constant interaction with an idealised version of others. This is a "core generational value" that this demographic holds compared to Millennials. Further, BeReal's users have been particularly strong across universities and university-aged students, and the majority of users are in the United States, the United Kingdom, and Germany. In 2022, the majority of users were female, with 43.2% of users falling within the age range of 16 to 25 and 55.1% of users being 26 to 44 years old.

BeReal, the platform encourages users to share their real time moments by sending a daily notification that gives a least two minutes to post a unedited photo using both the front and back camera, although users can post later and retake photos from when the notification happens, this action are still visible to friends, reinforcing transparency and genuine in the moment sharing.

== Reception ==
Jason Koebler, a writer for Vice, wrote that in contrast to Instagram, which presents an unattainable view of people's lives, BeReal instead "makes everyone look extremely boring". Niklas Myhr, a professor of social media at Chapman University, argued that depth of engagement may determine whether the app is a passing trend or has "staying power". Kelsey Weekman, a reporter for BuzzFeed News, noted that the app's unwillingness to "glamorise the banality of life" made it feel "humbling" in its emphasis on authenticity. Niloufar Haidari for The Guardian comments similarly that where the app succeeds in being "drab" in perhaps a positive way, it fails in potentially "un-inspiring" users. Likewise, Dr. Brad Ridout, a behavioral psychologist at the University of Sydney, emphasizes that the "boring" experience is what the creators are targeting for the app and, in response to Instagram's platform of flawlessness, that "perfection is the enemy of happiness".

=== Criticisms ===
Some people regularly post after the two-minute notification expires, leading to some criticism of the app, as the ability to post late undermines its aims of authenticity. In addition, BeReal's daily two-minute window has been argued to contribute to social media fatigue and a need for self-exposure, as well as constant access to phones.
