= Peter Molyneux =

English video game designer and game programmer

Peter Molyneux OBE
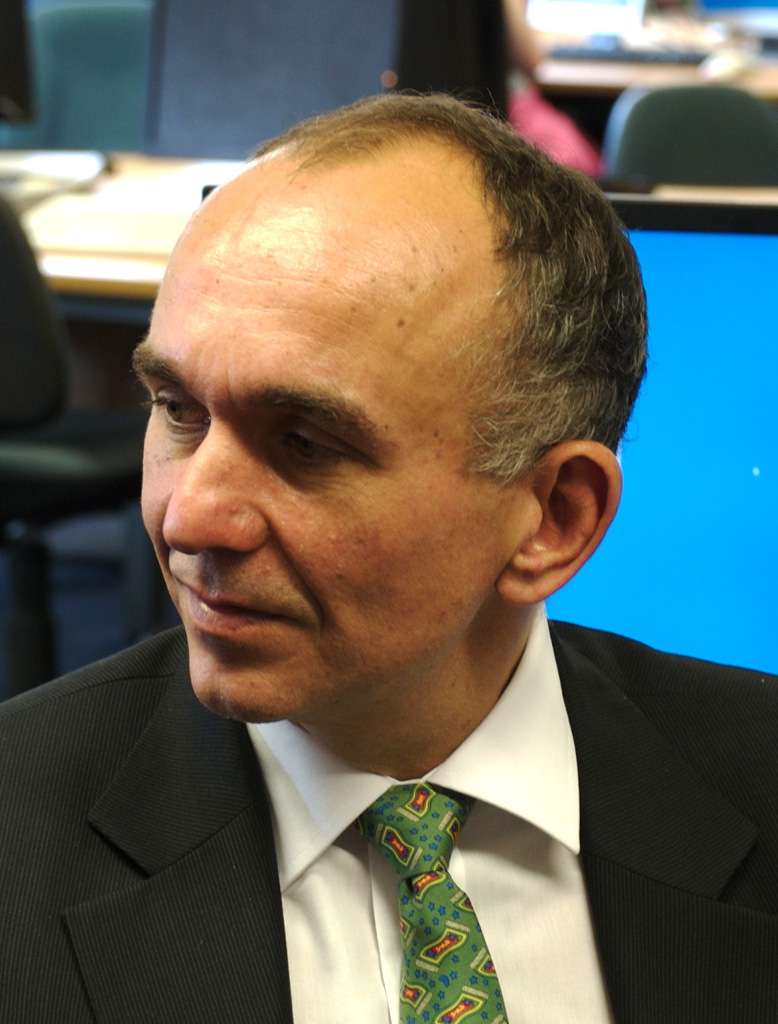
- Molyneux at the University of Southampton in 2007
- Born: Peter Douglas Molyneux; 5 May 1959 (age 67); Guildford, Surrey, England
- Occupation: Video game designer
- Years active: 1982–present
- Known for: Populous; Theme Park; Dungeon Keeper; Black & White; Fable series; Curiosity: What's Inside the Cube?; Godus; Masters of Albion
- Awards: Order of the British Empire; Chevalier de l'Ordre des Arts et des Lettres; AIAS Hall of Fame Award (2004); BAFTA Fellowship (2011)

Peter Douglas Molyneux OBE (/ˈmɒlɪnjuː/ MO-lin-yoo; born 5 May 1959) is an English video game designer and programmer. He created the Fable series; god games Populous, Dungeon Keeper, and Black & White; as well as Theme Park, Curiosity: What's Inside the Cube?, and Godus. In 2012, he founded 22cans, a video game development studio.

In 2009, he was chosen by IGN as one of the top 100 game creators of all time.

== Career ==
=== Early career ===
Peter Molyneux began his career in 1982 by distributing and selling floppy disks which contained video games for Atari and the Commodore 64. He believed that including games on the disks would improve sales, and later concluded that the games were the main selling point.

He created The Entrepreneur, a text-based business simulation game about running a struggling company. "In those days you could literally call a game 'Space Blob Attacks Mars' and sell about 50 million copies. So what did I do? I did a business simulation", Molyneux later said. Molyneux published the game himself in 1984 by duplicating hundreds of video tapes on two Tandy Corporation recorders. After taking a small free advertising space in a game magazine, he prepared for the game's success; he later stated in an interview, "I was utterly convinced that this game would sell tons. I thought, 'You know, this letter box is just not big enough. It's just not going to fit all the envelopes.' So I cut – and this is no joke – I cut a bigger letter box". However, the game received only two orders, one of which Molyneux speculated was from his mother. In 2007, a GameSpy reviewer commented that the economic gameplay mechanics in Molyneux's Fable II may have been a descendant of The Entrepreneur, stating, "I'm a little concerned that it's Molyneux sneaking in a remix of his first game, Entrepreneur".

Due to the game's failure, Molyneux retreated from game design, and started Taurus Impex Limited, which was a company that exported baked beans to the Middle East—with his business partner Les Edgar. Commodore International mistook it for Torus, a more established company that produced networking software, and offered to provide Molyneux with ten free Amiga systems to help in porting "his" networking software. Molyneux later said "it suddenly dawned on me that this guy didn't know who we were. I suddenly had this crisis of conscience. I thought, 'If this guy finds out, there go my free computers down the drain.' So I just shook his hand and ran out of that office." Taurus designed a database system for the Amiga called Acquisition – The Ultimate Database for The Amiga and, after clearing up the misunderstanding with Commodore, released the program to moderate success.

=== Bullfrog Productions and Electronic Arts ===
Using money earned from the database program, Molyneux and Les Edgar founded Bullfrog Productions in 1987. The company's first game was a conversion of Druid II: Enlightenment. Molyneux recalled, "I got in touch with a software company called Firebird and told them that I could program games. Of course I was bullshitting, but they gave me Druid 2 to convert to the Amiga. You're very unlikely to get that kind of break today." Molyneux provided the original concept for Populous, the first god game for the personal computer. Released in 1989, Populous was a major success for Bullfrog and went on to sell over 4 million copies.

Electronic Arts (EA), Bullfrog's publisher, acquired the studio in January 1995. Molyneux had become an Electronic Arts vice-president and consultant in 1994, after EA purchased a significant share of Bullfrog.

Molyneux left Bullfrog in July 1997 to found Lionhead Studios, shortly after the release of Dungeon Keeper. According to Molyneux, his choice to leave the company was a result of a chain of events from a night of drinking with his friend Tim Rance (who would later co-found Lionhead) around 1997. Molyneux had already been contemplating his departure (in 1996 the gaming news media reported "rumors" that he was unhappy at EA and would be leaving once Dungeon Keeper was completed), and, while discussing this with Rance, Rance suggested he write out his resignation letter to EA. Molyneux typed out an email to EA's CEO Larry Probst, and before Molyneux could stop him, Rance had sent the email. Though he quickly explained the situation to EA, the event caused tension in his relationship with EA, with EA asking him not to come into the office any more; according to Molyneux, EA feared that he would pull many of the other developers at Bullfrog along with him should he be present. EA threatened to pull support for Dungeon Keeper, which was still in progress, but Molyneux insisted they allow him to complete it, most of which he did from his own home. A significant innovation of the game was its unique combination of first- and third-person perspectives, in the ability to "possess" any one of the creatures (or "minions") in the game world, yielding a first-person experience reproducing the physical characteristics, visual perspective, gait, and voice of the minion.

Bullfrog continued to develop games through 2001, and in 2004 EA merged Bullfrog Productions into EA UK.

=== Lionhead Studios and Microsoft ===
Molyneux came up with the concept for Lionhead Studios' first game, Black & White, and convinced his small staff to take on the task in late 1997. He paid the $6 million in development costs himself. Despite his acrimonious departure from Electronic Arts, he opted to give them the publishing rights, explaining that EA were more reliable and had better worldwide distribution than any other publisher. After three years, in 2001, the game was finally released.

In April 2006, Lionhead Studios was acquired by Microsoft Game Studios. At E3 2006, Peter Molyneux gave several interviews in the press, in one of which he stated that "I think you're going to see a lot more fantastic games from Lionhead because of that relationship [with Microsoft]." On 4 June 2009, he was promoted to Creative Director of Microsoft Game Studios, Europe, although he continued to produce video games with Lionhead Studios.

On 7 March 2012, Molyneux announced that he would be leaving Lionhead and Microsoft—after the completion of Fable: The Journey—to begin work at a company founded by former Lionhead Studios CTO Tim Rance called 22cans.

=== 22cans ===
To date, 22cans has sold early access on multiple titles including Godus, Godus Wars, and The Trail. Despite years of development and successful Kickstarter financing for Godus, the game never left Steam Early Access. As of December 2023, both Godus and Godus Wars were removed from the Steam store.

In October 2023, Molyneux announced he was working on a new game, code-named Project MOAT, which was to be set in Albion, the setting of the Fable games. The project was officially unveiled on 20 August 2024, during Gamescom 2024, as a god game with the official name Masters of Albion.

== In the media ==
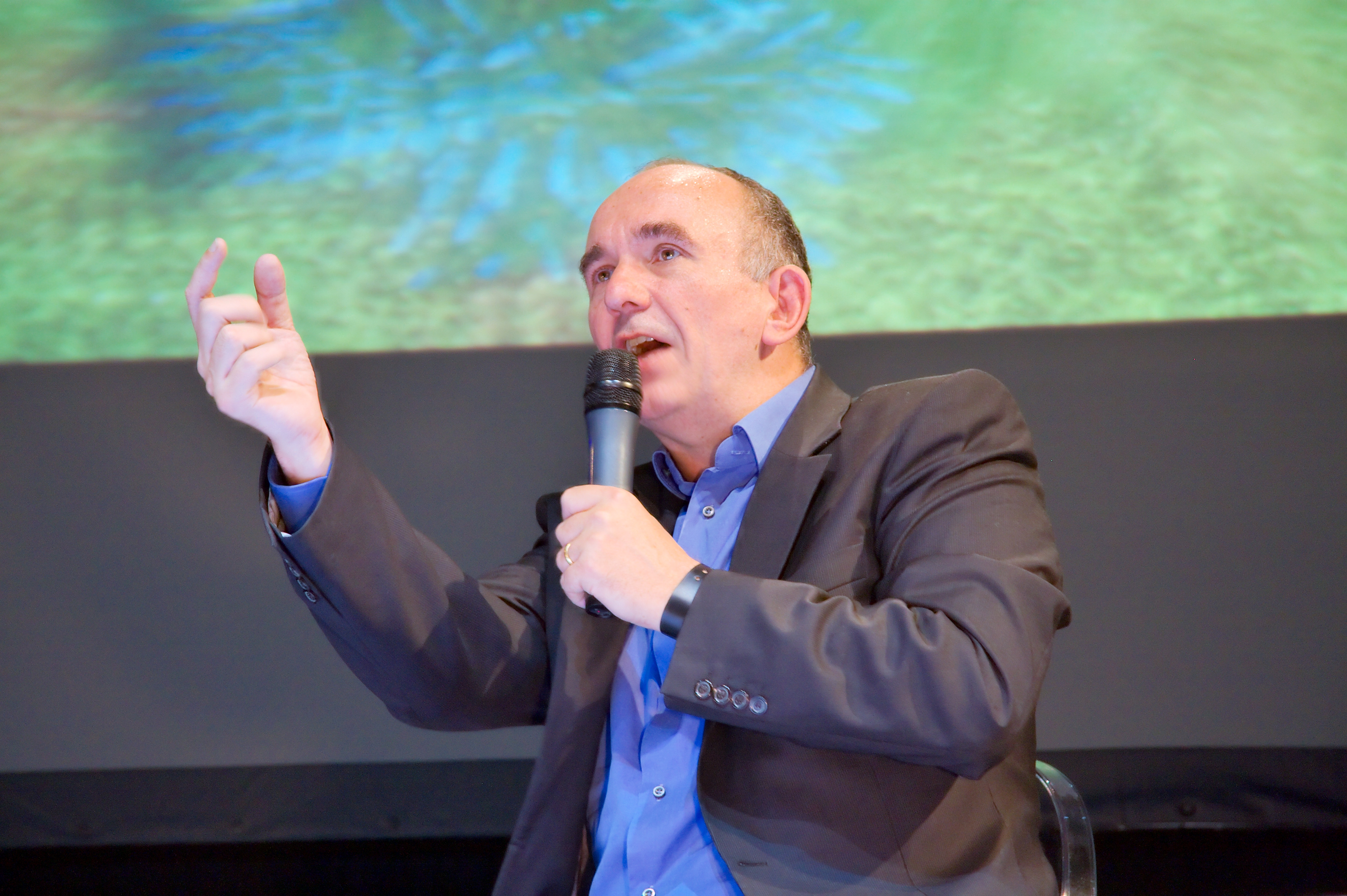
Presentation of Fable II with Molyneux at Festival du jeu vidéo in 2008

Molyneux has appeared on many television shows and video gaming news discussion or documentaries. He has been repeatedly interviewed for shows such as GamesMaster, Games Wars, Gamezville, Bad Influence!, Gamer.tv, and Games World. He also made an appearance in the Scottish web series Consolevania. Molyneux was featured within an episode of Godus alongside The Yogscast.

An episode of G4's games retrospective series Icons was devoted to him, during its third season. A two part interview was filmed of him during the 2006 Brighton Games Developer Conference by UK website Eurogamer. He was also featured in the fourth episode of the Discovery Channel mini-series Rise of the Video Game alongside Will Wright and Sid Meier, fellow developers of simulation titles. Molyneux was accredited in the "Top Ten Game Creators" Countdown by GameTrailers. He has given keynote addresses and spoke extensively at worldwide conferences, including Games Convention, Games Convention Asia, Develop, and the Game Developers Conference.

Despite the success of his games, both critical and financial, Molyneux has acquired a reputation for issuing over-enthusiastic descriptions of games under development, which then struggle to meet expectations. This goes back to Black & White, though the most well-known case of this was with Fable, released in 2004 without many of the features talked about by Molyneux in press interviews during development. After the release, Molyneux publicly apologized for overhyping the game. In February 2014, he was quoted as being "ashamed of the final product Fable 3 and I never want to work with Microsoft again." In February 2015, Peter Molyneux stated during interviews in gaming blog Rock, Paper, Shotgun and British newspaper The Guardian that he will "never speak to the press again", after being personally attacked for not fulfilling all game promises, which ended in Molyneux announcing that he will not conduct further interviews. At the same time, gamers and game developer veterans began to question the intentions of those publications, such as Tim Schafer calling it "out of proportion" and a media hunt, saying "I'm not saying that developers like Peter and I shouldn't be responsible and accountable to deadlines. I'm just saying the reaction to recent events and the tone of that reaction is really way out of proportion to the seriousness of the events themselves."

== Awards and recognition ==
Molyneux received an honorary doctorate from Abertay University in 2003. He was inducted into the AIAS Hall of Fame in 2004 and was honoured with an OBE in the New Year's Honors list announced on 31 December 2004. He was awarded the title of Chevalier de l'Ordre des Arts et des Lettres by the French government in March 2007. In July 2007, he was awarded an honorary degree of Doctor of Science by the University of Southampton and that same year an honorary doctorate by the University of Surrey. In March 2011, he was awarded the Lifetime Achievement Award by the Game Developers Choice Awards and has received a BAFTA Fellowship at the 2011 British Academy Video Games Awards.

== Games ==
=== Pre-Bullfrog ===
Title	Year	Role
The Entrepreneur	1984	Designer/programmer

=== Bullfrog Productions ===
Title	Year	Role	Notes
Druid II: Enlightenment	1988	Programmer	Amiga port
Populous	1989	Designer/programmer	
Flood	1990	Designer	
Powermonger	1990	Designer/programmer	
Populous II: Trials of the Olympian Gods	1991	Designer/programmer	
Syndicate	1993	Producer	
Magic Carpet	1994	Executive producer	
Theme Park	1994	Project leader/lead programmer	
Hi-Octane	1995	Executive producer	
Magic Carpet 2	1995	Designer	
Dungeon Keeper	1997	Project leader/designer	

=== Lionhead Studios ===
Title	Year	Role
Black & White	2001	Concept/lead designer/programmer
Fable	2004	Designer
Fable: The Lost Chapters	2005	Designer
Black & White 2	2005	Lead designer
The Movies	2005	Executive designer
Black & White 2: Battle of the Gods	2006	Lead designer
The Movies: Stunts & Effects	2006	Executive designer
Fable II	2008	Lead designer
Project Milo	2009	Lead designer
Fable III	2010	Lead designer
Fable: The Journey	2012	Creative consultant

=== 22cans ===
Title	Year	Role	Notes
Curiosity: What's Inside the Cube?	2012	Designer	
Godus	2014	Designer	
Godus Wars	2016	Designer	
The Trail: Frontier Challenge	2017	Designer (uncredited)	
Legacy	2023	Designer	NFT Game
Masters of Albion	2026		Announced 2023

== See also ==
- Peter Molydeux, a parody Twitter account
