= Games Convention Asia =

Video game exhibition in Singapore

GCA Games Convention Asia
- Official logo
- Status: Active
- Genre: Video games
- Venue: Suntec Singapore International Convention and Exhibition Centre
- Location: Singapore
- Country: Singapore
- Inaugurated: 2007
- Most recent: 2009
- Attendance: c. 102,500 public exhibition visitors, 80 exhibitors (2009)
- Organizer: LMI Asia Pte Ltd
- Website: www.gc-asia.sg

Games Convention Asia (GCA) is a major video game exhibition in the Asia-Pacific region. It consists of a public exhibition and a conference where the various players in the video game industry network and interact with each other, while showcasing their latest products and services to the public. Games Convention Asia serves as an entryway for companies trying to enter the Asian interactive entertainment market.

The concept behind the convention consists of four pillars: exhibition, business centre, matchmaking area, and GC Asia Conference. The GC Asia Conference allows developers and industry experts to exchange knowledge and know-how in panels and lectures and grow their international networks of business connections.

The event takes place over four days at the Suntec Singapore International Convention and Exhibition Centre in Singapore (September 17–20, 2009) and is organized by LMI Asia Pte Ltd., a subsidiary of Games Convention organizer, Leipziger Messe. In April 2008, LMI Asia Pte Ltd was founded in Singapore as an affiliate of LMI GmbH.

It was announced in March 2010 that the convention will no longer be held beginning from 2010 due to a low demand.

== Overview ==
Games Convention Asia consists of the Students' Day, the public exhibition and the Games Convention Asia Conference (GCAC).

Students` Day & Career Fair:

The computer games industry offers a range of job opportunities complementing the current large demand for new talent. The Students' Day & Career Fair allow students to meet industry icons and attend talks and workshops on various aspects of game design. Access to the Students' Day is free of charge though registration is required.

The Public Exhibition:

Used for local and international companies introduce the latest games and products to the market over three days. The first day is dedicated to business visitors and media only. After debuting in 2007 with an attendance of 70,000 visitors, 92,000 visitors were welcomed at GCA 2008. Going beyond gaming, the GCA also features entertainment, media education and other events. The last day of the show focuses on families with the GCA Family Day.
GCA's public exhibition also includes a cosplay competition. In 2008, the grand prize was a trip to BlizzCon 2008 in California. The cosplay competition for GCA 2009 is a qualifier to the Asia-Pacific Cosplay Competition in the G03 convention at Perth, Australia.

Games Convention Asia Conference (GCAC):

Held alongside the GCA. The conference is a set event with internationally known speakers and sponsors. In 2008, GCAC featured 75 speakers, many for the first time, including keynote speakers Michael De Plater of Ubisoft, Joonmo Kwon of Nexon, Peter Molyneux of Lionhead Studios and Cevat Yerli of Crytek.

The entire conference covers all aspects of the gaming industry and is divided into three main tracks: Art/Design, Business and Development and Production. Topics discussed include micro-transactions, outsourcing, pitching, cross-platform development and online mobile games.

It also contains the GCA Business Centre where industry participants present their companies and products. Here exhibitors, service providers, developers and journalists talk about trends, new products and business contacts. The Business Matchmaking tool is available for all participants of the GCA Business Centre and GCA Conference. It aims to support all attendees in initiating new business opportunities and closing deals. For this reason, professional attendees can create a profile visible to other Matchmaking participants.

Meetings are held during the event within a designated business area in an informal environment.

The 2009 GCAC will be hosting and Asia-Pacific centric D-I-C-E Summit as part of the convention's partnership with the Academy of Interactive Arts and Sciences.

== Background ==
Founded in 2007, the GCA Games Convention Asia is a business platform for developers, publishers, distributors, manufacturers and service providers of the games industry in Singapore and the Asia-Pacific region. It focuses on interactive entertainment, infotainment, edutainment, hardware and the latest server technologies. Besides showcasing the latest in computer games and hardware, it also features information on the world of entertainment, media education and various stage events (e.g. Cosplay – Singapore Finals 2009).

The theme for the Games Convention Asia is 'Inspire Yourself'.

In 2008 the GCA attracted more than 92,000 visitors and 118 exhibitors on a total gross area of 7,500 sqm, in addition 630 delegates and 75 speakers took part at the GC Asia Conference.

== 2008 convention speakers ==
- Peter Molyneux (Lionhead Studios, UK)
- Cevat Yerli (Crytek, Germany)
- Mario Wynands (Sidhe, New Zealand)
- Tom Crago (Tantalus, Australia)
- Allan Simonsen (Boomzap Entertainment/IGDA, Singapore)
- Don Daglow (Independent, USA)
- Joonmo Kwon (Nexon Corp/Nexon Mobile, South Korea)
- James Gray (EA Mobile, UK)
- Tom Felices (Nordic Game Program, Sweden)
- Melissa Lee (Massive Black, USA)
- Sean Kauppinen (International Digital Entertainment Agency, USA)
- Alexander Fernandez (Streamline Studios, Netherlands)
- Peter Paul Gadi (Anino Mobile, Philippines)
- Bob Wallace (Strategic Alternatives, USA)
- Feargus Carroll (Lucasfilm, Singapore)
- Keith Liu (Nokia, Singapore)
- Jason Della Rocca (IGDA, Canada)
- Henry Jenkins III (Massachusetts Institute of Technology, USA)
- Gary Mi (Radience, China)
- Ragnar Tornquist (Funcom, Norway)
- Arne Peters (cdv Entertainment, Germany)
- Michel Kripalani (Autodesk, USA)
- Garett Wiley (798 Group, China)
- Chris Natsumme (Boomzap Entertainment, Singapore)
- Maxime Villandre (Codemasters, Malaysia)
- Kok Khwang Ng (Asiasoft, Singapore)

Full list of GCAC 2008 Speakers is available at the GCA website.

== GCA 2010 cancelled ==
In March 2010, Leipziger Messe announced that due to the overall economic climate, it would not hold the convention in 2010. The company did not rule out returning to Asia with the convention, stating in a press release that they "will continue to keep an eye on the Asian games market".
