= Battle of the Gods (play-by-mail game) =

Play-by-mail game

- Publishers: Integral Games
- Years active: 1984 to unknown
- Genres: science fiction, play-by-mail
- Languages: English
- Playing time: Fixed
- Materials required: Instructions, order sheets, turn results, paper, pencil
- Media type: Play-by-mail or email

Battle of the Gods is a closed-end, computer moderated, science fiction play-by-mail (PBM) game that was published by Integral Games.

== Development ==
Integral Games of Arlington, Texas published Battle of the Gods in 1984. This was a closed-end, computer moderated, science fiction, play-by-mail game of easy to medium difficulty.

== Gameplay ==
In the game, "Players seek to control the universe by using their god-like powers". It had an innovative method of moving and mapping. At the outset, players allocate "multipliers" among four methods of advancing: conversion, creation, destruction, and teaching. Gods of various temperament have various possible actions beyond the powers of mortals.

== Reception ==
The editor of Gaming Universal, Bob McLain, reviewed the game in 1984, stating that it "may not become immortalized in the annals of PBM overnight, but it is good fun". He rated it at three stars of five, or "average". In the April 1985 edition of Dragon (Issue 96), Mike Gray liked the new concept, but questioned whether the game was worth its cost per turn, saying, "the game is relatively simple, and you can't do a whole lot for the $3.50 turn fee... It is not the most exciting PBM game. Half of the players in my game dropped out." However, he did think the game was good for new players: "For a beginning PBM player, the game is easy to understand and very clearly explained." Gray concluded with a hope that the game would be expanded and made more complex. "I like the fresh, new ideas in this game very much — I've never played anything else like it. Down the road, I can see these ideas expanded into a more complex and very interesting game."

== See also ==
- List of play-by-mail games

== Bibliography ==
- Editors (May–June 1984). "GameLine News & Updates: Integral Games". Paper Mayhem. No. 6. p. 18. A capsule-type review of the game.
- Gray, Mike (April 1985). "PBM Update, News & Views: Battle of the Gods". Dragon. No. 96. TSR, Inc. p. 38.
- McLain, Bob (Summer–Fall 1984). "Gamealog: Battle of the Gods". Gaming Universal. No. 3–4. p. 57.
