= Black & White (video game) =

God video game

- PC "black" cover
- Developer: Lionhead Studios
- Publishers: Electronic Arts; Feral Interactive (Mac)
- Director: Steve Jackson
- Designer: Peter Molyneux
- Programmers: Peter Molyneux; Mark Webley; Jonty Barnes
- Artists: Paul McLaughlin; Mark Healey; Andy Bass; Christian Bravery
- Writer: James Leach
- Composer: Russell Shaw
- Platforms: Mac OS, Microsoft Windows
- Release: Windows: NA: 27 March 2001; UK: 6 April 2001; Mac OS: NA: 7 January 2002
- Genres: Simulation, god game
- Modes: Single-player, multiplayer

Black & White is a god video game developed by Lionhead Studios and published by Electronic Arts for Microsoft Windows in 2001 and by Feral Interactive in 2002 for Mac OS. Black & White combines elements of artificial life and strategy. The player acts as a god whose goal is to defeat Nemesis, another god who wants to take over the world. A primary theme is the concept of good and evil, with the atmosphere being affected by the player's moral choices. The core gameplay mechanic of Black & White is the interaction between the player and an avatar creature, who carries out the player's instructions and whose personality and behaviour change in reaction to how they are treated. Multiplayer is supported over a local network or online.

Peter Molyneux led the three-year development of the highly anticipated game, originally to feature wizards instead of gods. Black & White was written from scratch, and the intention was to have the main user interface free of icons, buttons, and panels. Versions for games consoles were in development, but were cancelled.

Black & White received universal acclaim on release; reviewers praised the artificial intelligence, uniqueness, and depth, although the system requirements and bugs were criticised. Black & White won awards from several organisations, including the British Academy of Film and Television Arts, the Academy of Interactive Arts & Sciences and the Guinness World Record, for the complexity of the artificial intelligence, selling over two million copies. Later re-reviews of the game considered it to have been overrated at the time, but it was nevertheless considered one of the greatest games of all time. An expansion, Black & White: Creature Isle, and a sequel, Black & White 2, followed.

Since its original release, Lionhead and its intellectual property were purchased by Microsoft, while EA retains the publishing rights. The game was never re-released, and it has been described as abandonware.

== Gameplay ==
A Norse village at the beginning. Larger houses support more villagers.

The player takes on the role of a god ruling over several islands populated by various tribes. The player interacts with the environment via an animated, on-screen hand that is used to throw people and objects, tap houses to wake their occupants, cast miracles, and perform other actions. Key items in the story are gold and silver scrolls. Gold scrolls initiate a significant event (including the main story), and silver ones a minor task to perform for a reward.

Nearly every action (or lack thereof) affects how the player is judged by their followers: the player may be seen as a good god, an evil one, or in between the two. The land, interface (including the hand), and music change according to that alignment. A good god's temple is brightly coloured, while an evil god's is designed to look intimidating. It is not necessary to consistently perform acts of either alignment, and a mixture of the two can be used to stay neutral. The player has two advisors, one good and the other evil, who try to persuade the player to do things according to their alignment.

An important task is expanding the villages by constructing buildings and increasing the number of villagers. Important buildings include houses, the Village Centre (which displays the god who controls the village and the available miracles), and the Village Store (which stores resources and displays the villagers' desires). Buildings are created in the Workshop after obtaining blueprints. Wonders are special buildings granting a specific benefit. Villagers belong to one of eight tribes, such as Norse, Celtic, or Japanese, each having a different Wonder. Villagers can be assigned to perform a specific task such as fishing or starting a family. If the Temple is destroyed, the game is lost. When attacked, Temples transfer damage to their god's buildings and followers in defence; only Temples whose god has no followers are vulnerable.

The Temple is surrounded by sites where villagers worship, generating the power needed to cast miracles. Villagers require feeding, healing, or rest to worship. How many villagers worship is controlled at the Village Centre, and which miracles are available depends on those available at the player's villages. Miracles include providing food or wood, healing people, and providing shields to protect an area. Miracles can also be cast by using Miracle Dispensers, a common reward for completing Silver Reward Scrolls. These allow the casting of a miracle without worship. Miracles can only be cast, and most other actions performed, within the player's area of influence, which can be extended by expanding the population of villages owned or by taking over others. Miracles can be selected at the Temple or Village Centre, or by performing certain gestures with the Hand. Power can also be produced by sacrificing living beings at the altar.

The general goal of a level is to gain control over every village on an island, accomplished through acts that persuade the villagers to believe in the player. Villagers can be swayed by everything from assistance with day-to-day tasks to being terrorised by fireballs and lightning storms. Artefacts (special objects that glow in their owner's colour) and missionary disciples can be used to impress villagers. Villagers become bored with repetitive attempts to impress them. For example, if boulders fly overhead too frequently, their effect is lost. This forces the player to use multiple methods to convert a village.

The game features a skirmish mode, where other gods are battled for control of an island, a multiplayer mode over a local area network (LAN) or an online service, and The God's Playground, where gameplay aspects can be practised. In multiplayer mode, deathmatch and cooperative modes are available. In cooperative mode, players share a creature. Black & White includes a feature enabling the import of real weather.

=== Creature ===
One of Black & White's core features is the interaction between the player and an avatar-like creature. Three are available to select from the beginning of the game, and others can be obtained by completing Silver Reward Scrolls. The currently owned creature can be swapped with a new one at certain points in the game. The creature starts out small and grows as the game progresses. Each has strengths and weaknesses: apes are intelligent and proficient at learning but lack strength; tigers are strong but learn slowly.

As a god, the player can teach their creature to perform tasks such as stocking the village store or performing miracles. The creature is taught what and when to eat, and how to attack or impress enemy villages. Fighting skills may be taught in one-on-one battles with other creatures; attack and defence abilities can be improved. Teaching is performed using a reinforcement learning system: if the creature does something the player does not want, it can be discouraged with a slap. If the creature does something the player approves of, it can be stroked. The creature remembers the response to various actions and gradually changes its behaviour accordingly. With time and repetition, it can perform complex functions that allow it to serve as the player's avatar. Three types of leashes are used to command the creature to go to a specific place, and can be tied to a building to restrict movement. One leash encourages the creature to pay attention when actions are demonstrated; the others encourage either benevolent or malevolent behaviour. The game reinforces the creature's choices and learning by providing visual feedback, and the creature has an alignment separate from the player's. Evil wolves sport glowing eyes and large fangs and claws; good ones turn a shade of purple and glow gently.

Lionhead Studios used Michael Bratman's belief–desire–intention model to simulate creatures' learning and decision-making processes. A creature forms an intention by combining desires, opinions, and beliefs. Beliefs are attributed to lists that store data about various world objects. Desires are goals the creature wants to fulfill, expressed as simplified perceptrons. Opinions describe ways of satisfying a desire using decision trees. For each desire, the creature selects the belief with the best opinion, thus forming an intention or goal.

== Plot ==
The player begins on an island as a new god, created from a family's prayers. After saving their son from sharks, the god follows the grateful family to their village. A large creature (a lion, a bear, or a sheep, depending on your creature), known as the Guide, is later discovered, who tells the player of its former master, a god named Nemesis, who desires to reign supreme as the one true god by destroying all others. The player is told of the Creed, an energy source with the ability to destroy gods. Nemesis, upon hearing this, destroys his former creature and attacks the village. Shortly after a mysterious vortex opens and the player enters to escape Nemesis. He's transported to a second island and greeted by another god, Khazar. Khazar reveals that it was he who sent the vortex and requests assistance against another god, Lethys, Nemesis' underling, in exchange for resources to rebuild the village.

Later, Nemesis destroys Khazar and his creature, stealing his piece of the Creed in the process. Lethys then kidnaps the player's creature, taking it through a vortex that, unlike the others, closes automatically. In the third land, the creature is held in stasis by three magical pillars. After the creature is freed by converting the villages (and avoiding their reconversion by both burning unbelievers and a wolf pack), Lethys implores the player not to take his last village, grants the player a piece of the Creed, and opens a vortex. The player returns to the first land, now cursed by Nemesis; fireballs and lightning rain from the sky. After the curses are lifted by destroying the three guardian stones, a cursed village is freed and the piece of the Creed is claimed, Nemesis appears, inviting the player to his realm. On the last island, Nemesis curses the player's creature, causing it to slowly change alignments, shrink, and grow weaker. When the final piece of the Creed is obtained, the player destroys Nemesis and is left as the only god in the world.

== Development and release ==
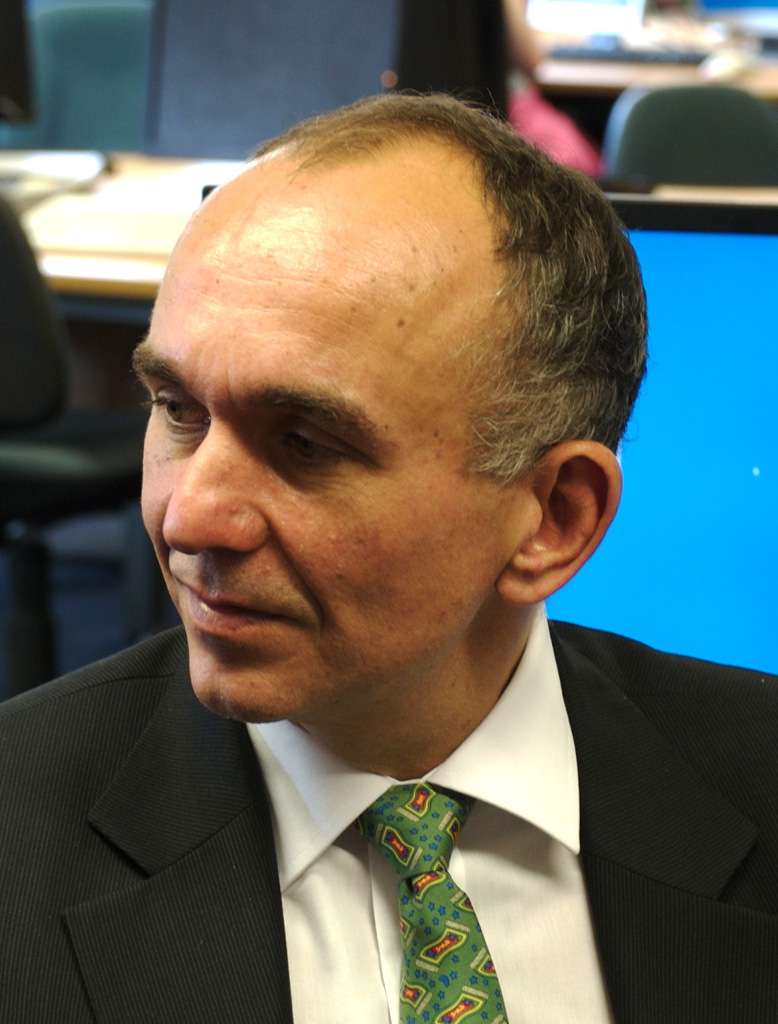
Black & White drew elements from Peter Molyneux's previous projects, Populous and Dungeon Keeper.

=== History ===
Black & White took over three years to develop, beginning on 14 February 1998, and was released on 27 March 2001. Peter Molyneux funded the project himself and devoted his entire focus to its development. Molyneux stated that he tried to correct the mistakes he made with the game design of Dungeon Keeper. The goal was to develop a unique game where players felt they inhabited a world where they could do anything. Molyneux had liked the idea of controlling people as a god since his previous venture, Populous. He was interested in the concept of good and evil and thought that this could be used to influence the game's atmosphere. Development was slow, starting with only six people, as Molyneux wanted to assemble the right team. Discussions about concepts (including a Mafia-style game) began at his house in 1997, and in February 1998, the team moved into Lionhead's offices. The expanded nine-person team exchanged further suggestions for the game and its content, such as lip-synchronised characters, although this was thought impossible. As more people joined, Molyneux wanted Lionhead's friendly atmosphere to remain, and their policy of only recruiting people who could fit in with existing members meant that the team had developed its own way of working. According to Molyneux, team members questioned and competed with each other, resulting in a better quality of work. He said that "the team did the work of a group twice their number." The group that finally produced the game numbered twenty-five programmers with a budget of approximately £4 million.

Molyneux stated that King Kong was an inspiration for the game. Soon afterwards, watching the Outer Limits episode "The Sandkings", he noticed that the episode featured bug-like creatures worshipping a scientist who moved around him in reverence whenever he was nearby. Molyneux thought that being admired with that level of devotion made one a god. Molyneux told Official Dreamcast Magazine that he had sought to recreate the "fantastic feeling" of destroying ant nests as a child.

In 1998, Black & White was shown at the E3 trade show in Atlanta, Georgia, and incorporated elements of Populous and Dungeon Keeper. Molyneux estimated the game would be nearly finished in 1999, and scheduled it for a late September 2000 release. Artificial intelligence was one of the key areas still being worked on. The game crashed multiple times; Molyneux fixed the bugs using Microsoft Developer Studio before restarting. He expected the 3D engine used would be an improvement when compared to his previous games. He instructed the programmers to "Make it the most beautiful engine ever conceived by anybody, ever". As of December 1998, no animators had been hired, and the art team was developing their own skills in that area. By this time, the engine was being developed by three people: Alex Evans, Jean-Claude Cuttier, and Scawen Roberts (who had joined from a courier company called, coincidentally, Black And White). Cottier developed the landscape system and found a method of generating textures, enabling the reflection of various types of terrain. Roberts created the creatures and the animation (Eric Bailey later took over the creature animations). Evans described developing the engine as "a daunting task". Composer Russell Shaw came up with the idea of the world changing appearance according to the player's alignment: he suggested that the player's territory loses colour if he plays evil, is gaily coloured if good. Artist Mark Healey wanted the cursor to be a magician's hand.

The entire game, including the tools and libraries, was written from scratch. A trial and error approach was taken: the team learned by trying something and changing what did not work. They avoided using control panels, icons and buttons for casting miracles, preferring a gesture system. Molyneux commented that he would have been very disappointed if the system was dumped, but in the end, they got the feature working "beautifully". Integrating the storyline was found to draw the player through the game in an unexpected manner, which led to the development of characters like Sable, the Creature trainer, and the advisers. A great deal of effort was devoted to getting features such as the weather import working.

The game was originally to feature battling wizards, who would have had creatures (originally named Titans) to raise and be powered by belief. A key idea was the ability to turn living beings into Titans. Healey's early visualisation featured the Horned Reaper from Dungeon Keeper representing Titans. The team wanted the player to see the world from the same perspective as possessing a creature in Dungeon Keeper (it was originally intended for the player to be able to take control of creatures in the first-person). Molyneux wanted "limitless flexibility" and the ability to zoom out to see the world from the sky. It was decided to make the player a god when it was realised that humans could not wield the powers that were being implemented. The spells that were to be cast became miracles, and the wizards' supporters became worshippers. The mechanic of turning living beings into Titans was dropped because of problems with balance, with certain Titans having advantages over others. After the name Titans was dropped, others were considered, including Sards, Demes, Ikons, Psiphs, and Amalians. None had unanimous support, so they ended up being called 'creatures'. Elements of the Wizard theme, such as Temples resembling a wizard's tower, remain in the final game. Temples were originally named Citadels, and some sported a medieval, fairy-tale look.

In January 1999, Richard Evans was working out how the game judges the morality of the player's behaviour. Mark Webley (who had programmed the creature's artificial intelligence on a testbed version) had become project manager, ensuring routines were listed on task schedules. He stated that this was "a hundred times more difficult" than similar tasks at Bullfrog Productions. By March, the team had expanded to 17 people, including five artists, five game programmers, two engine programmers, and a sound programmer. Lionhead wanted a maximum of 25 people so as not to break the "team spirit" atmosphere. Black & White was shown at E3 1999, where it was judged the most original game. At this time, Lionhead was considering 15 cover designs provided by Electronic Arts.

At E3 2000, Molyneux gave a precise release date: 23 September 2000. The game was supposed to reach the alpha stage by 18 June, but by summer, it became clear that development was behind schedule, and the release date was pushed back to 10 November. In September, it was pushed back again into 2001, angering fans who were eagerly awaiting its release. Molyneux apologised for the delay. By September 2000, every Lionhead member had their faces digitised for use on villagers. Villagers were auctioned online at QXL, with all proceeds going to the National Society for Prevention of Cruelty to Children. The team was surprised when the first one sold for £450, and the fourth one for over £1000. By October, Lionhead was operating around the clock to reach alpha. Shin Kanaoya of EA Square came to discuss the Japanese localisation, which was considered difficult due to the requirement of the use of two-byte characters to display the Japanese writing system, particularly the 20,000 Kanji characters, which would have posed RAM management issues. Lionhead was considering using the Japanese fonts included with Windows. In September, there were "dozens" of fan sites about Black & White. By November, there were around 150. Molyneux later said that Black & White was amongst the first video games to have fan sites, and that Lionhead was accused of over-promising when the sites described features the game did not have when shown.

Molyneux said that might have been "insanely ambitious" with regard to the standards they set themselves for the graphics, because the system requirements were high and much of the custom software needed to be written. One such program was a terrain-editing tool named Leadhead. He stated that they went from "bizarre ideas" to "the best game I have ever seen". The villagers' artificial intelligence had to be restricted by giving some control to the Village Centre, as there was no limit on the number of villagers. Molyneux said of the creature's artificial intelligence, "part of the game itself learns from everything you do and tailors itself to you", and described the creature as "an astonishing piece of work". He also commented that the last months of development were "the hardest any of us has ever had to work", and that "without the right team, this game never would have happened." The models for the trees, bushes, and other landscape features were created in 3D Studio Max, and initial graphics development was done in 2D using Adobe Photoshop. Later development was done using other custom software. Clan multiplayer, where multiple players play as one god, was developed in a rush; its interface had to be developed in two weeks. Black & White's online community was handled by two servers in London, where the clan creatures were stored to minimise the possibility of cheating.

Alpha was reached in December 2000. Multiplayer mode nearly had to be dropped for this to happen, but the problems were fixed just in time. Electronic Arts became involved in the production; testers were employed (they found three thousand bugs), localisations were checked, and a marketing campaign was launched. Fearing the bugs could kill the game, lists were sent to every member of the team, who had a chart, updated daily. The biggest problem was the final set, and fixing it created more bugs. Molyneux commented that "It was as if the game just didn't want to be finished and perfected", and remarked that the team felt like they had run a marathon after fixing the bugs. The end product was so large that they "almost felt lost within the code" which consisted of over a million lines and took over an hour to compile. The music, dialogue, and sound effects were compressed to fit on one CD, as they took five times as much space as the game. People not involved with the game's development began playing it and were extremely impressed. The release date was then set at 23 February 2001. Electronic Arts complained that the age at which the villagers were reproducing was below the age of consent for some countries, so this had to be changed. Lionhead announced that the game went gold (became ready to be released) on 16 March 2001. Molyneux credited fans for making the hardest times worthwhile. Because players encountered technical issues, rumours that Electronic Arts had shipped beta versions circulated; Lionhead denied them. Molyneux said Black & White was the most important and difficult game he had made. In June, a patch that fixed bugs was released. The Japanese version was released on 24 May 2001, and re-released as Black & White Special Edition (Note: Black & White Special Edition (ブラック＆ホワイト スペシャルエディション, Burakku ando howaito supesharu edishon)) under the EA Best Selections branding on 18 March 2004. Another patch was released, which would allow the Hand to be controlled by an Essential Reality P5 Glove, a virtual reality glove.

=== Story and characters ===
Work on the story began in October 1999 and took longer than expected. The team estimated two months, but soon realised they lacked the necessary skills to meet this deadline. Bullfrog's James Leach, who had previously worked on titles such as Dungeon Keeper and Theme Hospital, was recruited, and wrote many challenges, all the dialogue, and enabled the team to make the advisers characters rather than just sources of information. The idea to make the advisers characters came from Alex Evans, who wanted them to interact with their lips synchronised. A system was developed that moved their mouths into common phoneme shapes, used as a basis to turn them into graphic equalisers that move into shapes according to the sounds being played. This facilitated localisation, as the game was to be translated into fifteen languages. Both advisers were voiced by Marc Silk, cutting the recording time by roughly half. The initial designs were produced by artist Christian Bravery, but these were considered too similar to classic devils and angels. Healey redesigned the angel to be more like a fairy. He was accused of putting his girlfriend into the game, something which he agreed with on reflection: he admitted that it looked "rather a lot like her". He then designed an old man resembling a cross between a hippy, a yogi, and a "kindly old man". The advisers' animations and emotions were triggered by keywords in the script document, a Microsoft Excel file consisting of several thousand lines. Much of the script was for the advisers, as they were to comment on everything happening, as well as the other things players may want to do.

The challenges and quests were developed to keep players occupied while playing through the story. Molyeux told Leach about the ways of good and evil and the system's reflection of the player's behaviour, and provided him with a digital copy of the Bible with instructions to study the concepts due to their connection with gods and men. Leach decided to supplement the idea of evil with mischief, as he thought being completely evil by annoying or killing followers was senseless. Molyneux wanted a conflict between good and evil, and for the enemy gods to have the opposite alignment to the player. As a method of introducing the player to miracles and combat, a god whose alignment is the same as the player's was added.

Leach, Molyneux, and Webley were considering the final story when Jamie Durrant, an artist, became involved in the scripting language. A level designer, Ken Malcolm, was also hired, and their skills were considered invaluable. Malcolm said that the challenges were imagined as films with multiple endings because the story elements were different from games based on levels. According to him, the team had to "forget the rules" and focus on what players would do.

World domination was the story's goal. The Creed was a way of achieving that goal without having to convert every tribe. The intent was for the Creeds to be hosted inside creatures, obtainable only after the creature was dead. Winning the game would require three Creeds of the same alignment and their placement in the volcano on the fifth land. The explosion would "shatter the world" and the world would be the player's. As the story evolved, it was decided that the game should not force the player through it, as it would restrict his freedom. The team also wanted players to explore the world. The solution to this problem came in the form of the Gold Story Scrolls.

The other gods' actions and dialogue were written to be neutral, as they could be either good or evil. Some were influenced by the player's alignment, but some lines were spoken regardless of the player's alignment due to a lack of space. The concept of good and evil also affected the gods' names: bias towards a particular alignment was avoided because they could be either. Khazar and Lethys were "suitably old and legendary". The name Nemesis was to be replaced with "a huge, powerful name", but was liked by most of the team.

Programmer Oliver Purkiss was hired to program the villagers. He and Molyneux "worked tirelessly" to give the villagers autonomy and individuality without using too much processor power. Purkiss said that they did not want players to believe that villagers were worthless. Afterwards, it was decided that the villagers should have different belief levels, so the player would need to impress more sceptical ones. Richard Evans worked on the villagers' reactivity.

The script editor started out "simple", enabling programmers to perform camera angles and move villagers, and the first script was created when Cottier added a widescreen function. Molyneux wanted "an epic tale", so tools such as cinematography and the ability to analyse the creature and the player's alignment and abilities were needed. Jason Hutchens, an "expert in languages", was hired and helped create a "more natural" language compiler. A system to generalise each approach to challenges was also needed. The script editor and language were simple enough for non-programmers to use, and was also capable of writing complex scripts.

=== Sound and music ===
Shaw was head of music and sound. He handled the voice recording, all the sound effects, and composed the music. He also played instruments and sang: the first land's Missionaries' song featured the voices of Shaw and Webley. It was originally Shaw's intention for there to be no dialogue. The game had over 5000 sound effects by January 2000.

Shaw's lack of experience in playing "ethnic" instruments was a problem, but Steafan Hannigan, an expert on the subject, was enlisted to help. Hannigan further enlisted a musical ensemble who covered the instruments for every tribe. Silc's speech was performed at Electronic Arts's sound studio in Chertsey over three-and-a-half days. The sessions were directed by Leach, and the lines were recorded onto hard disk by Electronic Arts engineer Bill Lusty. The recordings were then burnt to CD, which were sent to Shaw, who then "cut up" each line and assigned them to those in the game. Afterwards, Hugo Myatt and Shelley Blond were recorded at Lionhead.

=== Creature ===
The decision to base the creatures on real animals was made early on. To offer players variety, a mixture of benign and aggressive creatures was deemed necessary. The team decided to implement anthropomorphised bipedal animals, because their humanoid form evoked empathy, and credibility in their potential sentience. Due to technical restraints, bipedal creatures also provided greater flexibility for animation and game dynamics.

The lion was constructed for the prototype. 3D Studio Max was used to build the wire-mesh frame, and then Adobe Photoshop was used to skin the creature. The skeleton was added, which was used by an animator to perform movements. The good creatures' appearances were the most problematic, and the transformation between alignments was also thought to be "a huge challenge". Each form was built from seven meshes and three texture sets. This enabled subtle variation. The eyes were originally painted as a texture, but this was deemed "unsatisfactory". Later, the eyes were built using separate geometry that moves independently, and were added using the game's creature editor.

To implement the transformation of the creature based on its alignment, Alex Evans developed an exporter program to export 3D Studio Max's models and animations, and Roberts created one to import them and apply them to the lion. Each version of the creature was then loaded, and interpolation code was written, as well as a blended animation between two similar ones. The system has a two-way blend: one for the alignment, and the other for how fat the creature is. As there was not going to be many creatures on one map, the team were able to use CPU resources to run many animations simultaneously on a single creature.

The planned level of artificial intelligence for the creature was thought to be risky: Molyneux commented that they wanted to "advance the technology to its extreme", and artificial intelligence specialist Richard Evans built the technology, which according to Molyneux appeared to "live and learn like, say, a clever puppy". Molyneux desired the creature to pass the Turing test, which had not yet been achieved.

=== Other versions ===
An online version, Black & White: The Gathering, was in development, and would have enabled creatures to interact with those of other players in a cut-down game environment over the internet. Lionhead planned to release Black & White: The Gathering two months before the main game's release as a free download, and it was to offer a choice of creatures. It would have linked with chat programs such as AOL instant messenger and ICQ and convert text to a speech bubble from the creature. It was intended for players to be able to upload the main game's creature into Black & White: The Gathering and its experiences to be saved into the main game. Another online program, Black & White Worlds, was in development. This would have taken place in the worlds of the main game. Molyneux explained that there was to be a server, whose worlds would have been set up with a match-making system and players would have been able to do battle, like last man standing. There was also a plan to produce Black & White Universe, in which players would have had a persistent online world.

A PlayStation version was in development and scheduled for release in summer 2001, and a Dreamcast version in late 2001. Both were cancelled. The PlayStation version was in development by Blade Interactive Studios and was going to be published by Midas Interactive and Bethesda Softworks. PlayStation 2 and Xbox versions were due for release in 2002. Versions for the Game Boy Color and Game Boy Advance were proposed, but never materialised. A company called M4 was to have co-developed them alongside Lionhead, but Electronic Arts were not interested in the Game Boy versions. Molyneux stated that the Dreamcast version was cancelled because it was taking time to convert the game for the platform, and development had not progressed far enough for it to be worth continuing as interest in the platform was declining. Versions for Linux and BeOS were mooted, but were not greenlit by any prospective publisher.

A spinoff of the series, Black & White Creatures was announced for the Nintendo DS in May 2005. While the original was a large scale god game for PC platforms, the DS version was more of a smaller scale pet simulator adaption of the original concept. A very early 20% complete version of the game was playable at E3 2005, but the game was eventually cancelled. A similarly very early, barely playable build of the game leaked onto the internet in 2021. A PlayStation Portable version was also announced, but never released.

== Reception ==
Reception

Aggregate score
Aggregator	Score
Metacritic	90/100

Review scores
Publication	Score
AllGame	4.5/5
Computer Gaming World	5/5
Edge	9/10
Game Informer	9/10
GamePro	5/5
GameRevolution	A
GameSpot	9.3/10
GameSpy	91%
GameZone	9/10
IGN	9.7/10
Next Generation	5/5
PC Gamer (US)	94%
X-Play	5/5
The Cincinnati Enquirer	4.5/5
Playboy	85%
Gamezilla	94%
Inside Mac Games	8.25/10(Macintosh)
PC Zone	95%
Computer Games Magazine	3/5
Maxim	4/5

Critics lauded Black & White with "universal acclaim" according to video game review aggregator website Metacritic. The graphics, gameplay, and artificial intelligence in particular were well received. Black & White sold two and a half million copies on the PC by 2006. In the United States, NPD Techworld ranked Black & White as the 11th-biggest computer game seller of 2001. Its sales in that region totaled 464,325 units, for revenues of $19.3 million, by the end of the year. It received a "Platinum" sales award from the Entertainment and Leisure Software Publishers Association (ELSPA), indicating sales of at least 300,000 copies in the United Kingdom.

Maxim's Scott Steinberg complimented the design, saying it "lets you indulge your most megalomaniacal fantasies with ease". IGN's Tal Blevins complimented the "wildly imaginative" single-player mode, and the graphics, describing the game as "a visual masterpiece". AllGame's Michael House eulogised the "[a]bsolutely stunning and gorgeous" graphics. Marc Saltzman of The Cincinnati Enquirer complimented the addictiveness and "superb" gameplay, but criticised the high system requirements. Playboy's Michael Ryan complimented the "intelligent" sense of humour, "intense" visual appeal, and addictiveness, but criticised the frequent micromanagement and ambiguous objectives.

Game Informer's Kristian Brogger was impressed with the game's depth. GameZone's reviewer praised the landscapes, described the music as "fit for a god", and complimented the game for merging genres. Greg Kasavin of GameSpot concurred with this, stating: "No other PC game to date has so effectively combined so many seemingly incompatible elements into one highly polished game". Computer Gaming World's Charles Ardai commended the artificial intelligence and graphics, describing the landscape as "stunning". Ben Silverman of Game Revolution approved the "[u]nbelievable presentation" and agreed with Computer Gaming World on the artificial intelligence, calling it "revolutionary". GamePro's reviewer complimented the realism, stating that it is like interacting with a real world, and echoed others' views on the artificial intelligence by describing it as "impressive". X-Play commended the graphics, but criticised the high system requirements.

Uniqueness and originality garnered critical praise. Craig Wessel of GameSpy felt the game is a unique and enjoyable strategy game. Originality was commended by PC Gamer's reviewer, who also eulogised the "[b]eautiful" graphics, "awesome" interface, and its creativity, and Gamezilla's Alex Karls, who also remarked the game "lives up to its hype". Edge's reviewer agreed about the originality, and described the game as "a colossal achievement". Keith Pullin of PC Zone compared the resource management to Age of Empires, and complimented the humour and pop culture references and praised the combination of original ideas, remarking that "B&W is as captivating as it is ingenious". Computer Games Magazine complimented the originality and "amazing" creature AI, but complained about the bugs. Jim Preston of Next Generation described the game as "thoughtful and engrossing". Reviewing the Macintosh version, Kit Pierce of Inside Mac Games remarked "Black & White is a gorgeous game", and commended its addictiveness.

Several publications re-reviewed the game later and, while still well received, have re-evaluated their initial judgement. Black & White was selected by GameSpy as the most over-rated game of all time in an article published in September 2003, citing a lack of true interaction with the townspeople and poor use of the much-lauded creatures as reasons it disappointed. IGN mentioned the game in one of their podcasts discussing over-rated games.

=== Awards ===
Year	Category	Institution or publication	Result	Notes	Ref.
1999	Best Original Game	Game Critics Awards	Won	Electronic Entertainment Expo	
1999	Best Strategy Game	Game Critics Awards	Nominated	Electronic Entertainment Expo	
1999	Best PC Game	Game Critics Awards	Nominated	Electronic Entertainment Expo	
2000	Best PC Game	Game Critics Awards	Won	Electronic Entertainment Expo	
2000	Best Strategy Game	Game Critics Awards	Won	Electronic Entertainment Expo	
2000	Best of Show	Game Critics Awards	Won	Electronic Entertainment Expo	
2000	Best Original Game	Game Critics Awards	Won	Electronic Entertainment Expo	
2000	Most Innovative	IGN	Won	Electronic Entertainment Expo	
2000	Best of Show	IGN	Nominated	Electronic Entertainment Expo	
2001	Interactivity	British Academy of Film and Television Arts	Won		
2001	Moving Images	British Academy of Film and Television Arts	Won		
2001	PC Games	British Academy of Film and Television Arts	Nominated		
2001	Music	British Academy of Film and Television Arts	Nominated		
2001	Technical Innovation	British Academy of Film and Television Arts	Nominated		
2001	Networked Games	British Academy of Film and Television Arts	Nominated		
2001	Editor's Choice	PC Gamer	Won		
2001	Editor's Choice	Computer Gaming World	Won		
2001	Classic Award	PC Zone	Won		
2001	PC Game of the Year Benelux	European Computer Trade Show	Won		
2001	PC Game of the Year Eastern Europe	European Computer Trade Show	Won		
2001	PC Game of the Year Germany	European Computer Trade Show	Won		
2001	PC Game of the Year Italy	European Computer Trade Show	Won		
2001	PC Game of the Year Scandinavia	European Computer Trade Show	Won		
2001	PC Game of the Year Spain	European Computer Trade Show	Won		
2002	Computer Innovation	Academy of Interactive Arts & Sciences	Won		
2002	Computer Game of the Year	Academy of Interactive Arts & Sciences	Won		
2002	Animation	Academy of Interactive Arts & Sciences	Nominated		
2002	Character or Story Development	Academy of Interactive Arts & Sciences	Nominated		
2002	Game of the Year	Academy of Interactive Arts & Sciences	Nominated		
2002	Game Play Engineering	Academy of Interactive Arts & Sciences	Nominated		
2002	PC Strategy	Academy of Interactive Arts & Sciences	Nominated		
2002	Excellence in Programming	Game Developers Choice Awards	Won	Richard Evans	
2002	Game Innovation	Game Developers Choice Awards	Won		
2002	Game of the Year	Game Developers Choice Awards	Nominated		
2002	Excellence in Game Design	Game Developers Choice Awards	Nominated	Peter Molyneux and the team.	
2002	Best AI	PC Gamer	Won		
2002	Game of the Year	Games Magazine	Won		
	Gold Award of Excellence	Electronic Multimedia Awards	Won		

=== Accolades ===
Black & White was named by PC World as the Best Video Game of 2001, appeared at number one on AiGameDev.com's most influential AI games list, and appeared in the 2003 Guinness World Records for having the "most intelligent being in a game".
