= God game =

Video game genre

A god game is an artificial life game that casts the player in the position of controlling the game on a large scale, as an entity with divine and supernatural powers, as a great leader, or with no specified character (as in Spore), and places them in charge of a game setting containing autonomous characters to guard and influence.

== Definition ==
God games are a subgenre of artificial life game, where players use supernatural powers to indirectly influence a population of simulated worshippers. It has also been categorized as a subgenre of strategy video games, though unlike other strategy video games, players are unable to tell specific units what to do. The genre is also separate from construction and management simulations, because gameplay revolves around growing and utilizing their supernatural powers to indirectly influence their worshippers, such as by placing a target marker or goal for the worshippers to conquer, or affect those of their opponents, such as by creating natural disasters. God games are typically single-player games played against a computerized opponent, but some involve competition between many rival players.

== Game design ==
God games allow players to take on the role of a god with limited powers, similar to the gods from the mythology of ancient Greece. The player's power comes from simulated worshippers, who are usually simple or tribal in nature. It is common for most people in god games to look alike. Early god games only featured models for full-grown men and women, while Black and White introduced children. Players must economize quantities of power or mana, which are derived from the size and prosperity of their population of worshippers. The player consumes this power by using godly powers to help their worshippers, such as blessing their crops or flattening hills to make better farmland. This results in a positive feedback loop, where more power allows the player to help their population grow which helps them gain more power. However, more powerful abilities typically require more power, and these usually take the form of natural disasters that can damage rival populations rather than improve life for the player's worshippers. Games typically utilize an aerial top-down perspective, similar to a real-time strategy game.

God games are classified as a subgenre of artificial life game because players tend to a population of simulated people that they control only indirectly. Although god games share qualities with both construction and management simulation games and real-time strategy games, players in god games are only able to exercise indirect control over their population. They cannot tell specific units what to do, as seen in strategy games, although players may sometimes compete against other players with their own population of supporters. Moreover, players are given godlike powers not seen in construction or management games, such as the ability to control the weather, transform the landscape, and bless or curse different populations.

== History ==
Although there are many influences on the god game genre, the first god game is widely considered to be Populous from 1989. Developed by Peter Molyneux of Bullfrog Productions, the game established the gameplay template where the player's godlike powers would grow in proportion to the population of their worshippers. The game gives players supernatural powers over land and nature that could be used for good or evil, and some of this gameplay was emulated by other real-time strategy games with more direct control. Notable hybrids of the genre include ActRaiser for the Super NES in 1990. It was also an influence on the real-time strategy hybrid Dungeon Keeper, developed by Molyneux in 1997.

Both Molyneux's Black & White and Godus were heavily influenced by the Populous series.
