= Ruff 'n' Tumble =

1994 video game

- Developer: Wunderkind
- Publisher: Renegade Software
- Producer: Graeme Boxall
- Designers: Jason Perkins; Robin Levy
- Programmer: Jason Perkins
- Artist: Robin Levy
- Writers: Andy Nuttall; Sarah Tanser
- Composer: Jason Page
- Platform: Amiga
- Release: EU: 1994
- Genres: Platform, run and gun
- Mode: Single-player

Ruff 'n' Tumble is a 1994 platform run and gun video game developed by Wunderkind and published by Renegade Software for the Amiga. An Amiga CD32 version was planned but never released. It was the only game made by Wunderkind. It stars Ruff Rodgers, embarking on a quest across an alien planet to reclaim his marbles after one of them fell into a portal inside a rabbit hole while playing with his collection in the park, and free the planet from Dr. Destiny and his Tinhead army. Through the journey, the player explores and search through each level for items and power-ups, as well as fight enemies and defeat bosses.

Ruff 'n' Tumble was the creation of Wunderkind, a group within Renegade consisting of programmer Jason Perkins, artist Robin Levy, and composer Jason Page. Levy was contacted by Perkins, due to their previous working experience on Apocalypse (1994) for Virgin Interactive Entertainment, and was asked if he was interested in making a game with him. Perkins wanted to make a platform game while Levy preferred a shoot 'em up, with the original idea being a "platform-based Defender". Emphasis was placed on playability to make it fun compared to similar titles, with the aim of being the "perfect" action game for the Amiga, while various technique features were implemented to make it fast and playable. The team also used an in-house map editor by Renegade, which allowed puzzles and traps being quickly designed. Both Perkins and Levy went separate ways after finishing the project.

Ruff 'n' Tumble garnered favourable reception from the Amiga gaming press; praised was given to the detailed arcade-style graphics for their quality and spritework, varied level design and gameplay but most reviewers felt mixed regarding the audio and difficulty, while criticism was geared towards the lack of additional levels, difficulty settings, innovation and originality.

== Gameplay and premise ==
Ruff Rodgers at the beginning of the first level

Ruff 'n' Tumble is a platform run and gun starring Ruff Rodgers, an eight-year-old boy who loses one of his marbles while playing in the park and follows it down a rabbit hole, which turns out to be a portal to an alien planet. The planet, ruled by the mad Dr. Destiny, is home to fearsome army of robots called Tinheads. Ruff finds that his marble collection has been scattered across the planet, and embarks on a quest to reclaim his collection, and free the planet from Destiny and his Tinhead Army.

The player progresses through each level by running, jumping, and shooting at enemies with his multi-projectile gun, capable of shooting bullets, laser, missiles or becoming a flame thrower (depending on what power-ups are collected during the level). Each level is completed by collecting a set number of coloured marbles (red, green and blue). Upon collecting all of the marbles, the exit to the level is unlocked. There are four worlds in the game, each with four main levels in them, and a fifth boss level. Each world features its own variety of enemies and traps. The game uses a password system that enables the player to access the first level of the specific world.

== Development and release ==
Ruff 'n' Tumble was created by Wunderkind, a group within Renegade Software consisting of programmer Jason Perkins, artist Robin Levy, and composer Jason Page. Perkins previously worked on Monty on the Run, Thing on a Spring and Apocalypse (1994) for Virgin Interactive Entertainment. Levy's past works include Armalyte, Myth: History in the Making and the Commodore 64 version of Last Ninja 3. Page began his career at Graftgold, taking over the role of in-house musician from founder Steve Turner, before moving to Sony Computer Entertainment Europe. Both Perkins and Levy acted as co-designers of the title, while Perkins came up with the original concept. Graeme Boxall led development of the project as producer at Renegade. Andrew "Andy" Nuttall and Sarah Tanser, two journalists from the Amiga gaming press, were responsible for writing the game's manual text. Both Perkins and Levy recounted its development process and history.

Levy received a call from Perkins, due to their previous working experience on Apocalypse, and was asked if he was interested in making a game with him. Perkins wanted to make a platform game while Levy preferred a shoot 'em up, the latter of whom claimed that the original idea for the game was a "platform-based Defender". Emphasis was placed on playability to make it fun compared to similar titles, with the team's aim being to make the most playable and "perfect" action-platform game for Amiga. To build each level, the staff made use of an in-house map editor by Renegade, which allowed puzzles and traps being quickly designed and placed on-screen. Perkins also implemented an "auto-scroll controller" feature, in which each block making up the screen is given an attribute to tell the game where to scroll and let the player see their path. The lack of parallax scrolling was a decision taken by both Perkins and Levy, feeling they could not make the game fast and playable. The team remarked they did started making a 16-color parallax scrolling background until Levy created 32-color screens without parallax before coming up with "non-parallaxing parallax", a technique where backgrounds are blurred to create a sense of depth and add a three-dimensional aspect to them.

Ruff 'n' Tumble was first announced in 1993 and showcased at Renegade's booth during the European Computer Trade Show of that year. Early previews showcased several differences compared to the final version such as a minecart setpiece in the second world and a different HUD. According to contemporary game publications such as Amiga Dream and Amiga Power, the game was reportedly slated for launch between July and August 1994. Amiga Power, as well as other publications within the Amiga gaming press like CU Amiga and The One for Amiga Games wrote that it was released between September or October 1994. A version for the Amiga CD32 was planned but never released. It was Wunderkind's only game, as the group never developed another title, while both Perkins and Levy went separate ways after finishing the project.

== Reception ==
Reception

Review scores
Publication	Score
Aktueller Software Markt	8/12
Amiga Action	91%
Amiga Computing	89%
Amiga Format	87%
Amiga Power	88%
Amiga User International	90%
Génération 4	88%
Amiga Concept	92%
Amiga Dream	94%
Amiga Games	79%
Amiga Joker	91%
CU Amiga	92%
The One for Amiga Games	92%

Ruff 'n' Tumble received favourable reception from the Amiga gaming press. The One for Amiga Games' Simon Byron praised the graphics for its style and spritework, level design, setpieces, enemy AI, fine-tuned gameplay, soundtrack and overall longevity. Amiga Action's Paul McNally and Paul Roundell praised commended its high-quality graphics, Chaos Engine-esque sound design and playability, stating that it was as good as Putty Squad, though they noted that its difficulty was tricky due to the more manic gameplay compared to the latter game and criticized its high asking price. Amiga Format's Stephen Bradley gave positive remarks to the title's sprite animations, smooth scrolling, varied level design, sound department and addictive playability, although he ultimately stated that the game was not very original.

Amiga Power's Jonathan Davies gave positive commentary to the firm but fair stage designs, slick visuals and sound effects but criticized its high difficulty and music for being awful. CU Amiga's Tony Dillon called it an "CU Amiga Super Star", giving positive remarks to Jason Perkins and Robin Levy for blending platforming action and shoot 'em up to create a playable and polished product. Aktueller Software Markt's Jürgen Borngießer noted that Ruff 'n' Tumble felt like a console game due to its use of a joystick or joypad for controls and commended its visuals, audio, presentation and fun factor. Both Amiga Concept's Cyril De Graeve and Amiga Dream's Grégory Halliday also gave positive remarks to the game's colorful and detailed graphics, sprite animations, music and sound, difficulty, longevity and overall controls.

Amiga Joker's Max Magenauer considered it an "Amiga Joker Mega Hit" and the best action title on the Amiga, highly praising its animated visuals, sound design, controls and fun factor. Génération 4's Michel Houng praised the sprite animations, playability, arcade-style graphics and good sound effects but noted its music and the lack of additional levels as negative points. Amiga Computing's Jonathan Maddock referred the graphics as "exquisite" and "gorgeous", comparing it with Bitmap Brothers' Gods and Magic Pockets. Maddock also regarded the music as adequate and the gameplay as addictive, while he felt that its difficulty was appealing as well.

In contrast to most reviewers, Amiga Games' Oliver Preißner criticized its gameplay for the lack of innovation and absence of additional difficulty levels but gave the game positive commentary for its visual presentation. In a similar tone as Dillon, British magazine Amiga User International commended both Perkins and Levy for creating a balance between platforming and shooting with the title's design, praising its gameplay, audio and graphics.
