= Galacticare =

2024 video game

- Developer(s): Brightrock Games
- Publisher(s): Cult Games
- Engine: Unity
- Platform(s): PlayStation 5, Windows, Xbox Series X/S
- Release: May 23, 2024
- Genre(s): Business simulation
- Mode(s): Single-player

Galacticare is a 2024 business simulation game developed by Brightrock Games and published by Cult Games for the PlayStation 5, Windows and Xbox Series X/S. The game was announced in March 2023.

== Gameplay ==
The player takes on the role of a hospital administrator charged with constructing and maintaining an intergalactic hospital. Tasks include building rooms and amenities that satisfy the needs of patients and staff (which include different alien species). There are scenarios where the player works for a deep space prison or a music festival.

== Reception ==
Galacticare was often compared to Theme Hospital and Two Point Hospital.

Previews

Softpedia summarized: "Galacticare will be a hit with anyone who’s into both science fiction and efficiency tweaking." CGMagazine called it "a fun romp" and said "the comedy lands well". PC Games said the game seems like "a fun pastime" but feels simple and lacks innovation.

Reviews

Gamereactor gave Galacticare a score of seven out of ten and noted that the game isn't as refined as Two Point Studios' games. Rock Paper Shotgun suggested Galacticare for fans of management games, however, they mentioned that it may not appeal to those who are not already fans of the genre.

== See also ==
- War for the Overworld, the developer's previous game, also inspired by a Bullfrog game
