= Hospital Tycoon =

2007 video game

- Developer(s): DR Studios
- Publisher(s): Codemasters
- Engine: Gamebryo
- Platform(s): Microsoft Windows
- Release: NA: June 5, 2007; EU: June 8, 2007; AU: August 12, 2007
- Genre(s): Business simulation
- Mode(s): Single-player

Hospital Tycoon is a business simulation video game developed by DR Studios and published by Codemasters for Microsoft Windows. It was released in 2007 on June 5 in North America, June 8 in Europe and August 12 in Australia.

== Gameplay ==
The game allows the player to manage a hospital from a god view. Each hospital is staffed by medical teams and packed with ill patients. The player is required to manage the staff and ensure patients are cared for and have the correct treatment facilities. As time progresses, new equipment will need to be built in order to cope with incoming patients. The game can also be played in a sandbox mode.

== Reception ==
Reception

Review score
Publication	Score
Power Unlimited	55%

The game garnered low review scores from video game critics who criticised the game's graphics and bugs. Many reviews criticize the game for being derivative of Theme Hospital. The game has been praised however for its developed storyline, similar to television dramas such as ER.

== See also ==
- Theme Hospital
- Two Point Hospital
- Project Hospital
