= Gary Carr (video game developer) =

English video game developer

- Born: February 1966 (age 60)
- Occupation: Video game developer
- Known for: Populous II; Powermonger; Theme Hospital; The Movies; Fable: The Journey; Two Point Hospital

Gary Carr (born February 1966) is an English video game developer. His career began at Palace Software, where he worked on titles such as Barbarian: The Ultimate Warrior and Barbarian II: The Dungeon of Drax. In 1989, he joined Bullfrog Productions and worked as lead artist on Powermonger and Populous II. He also worked on Theme Park, but, after a disagreement with Peter Molyneux, he left the company to work for The Bitmap Brothers, where he worked on The Chaos Engine 2. He returned to Bullfrog in 1995 hoping to work on Dungeon Keeper, but worked on Theme Hospital instead. He left Bullfrog again in 1998 to join Mucky Foot Productions.

In 2003, he joined Lionhead Studios, and later became a Creative Director, as well as an Executive Producer at Microsoft Game Studios. He left Lionhead in 2015. The following year, he set up a new company, Two Point Studios. In 2017, the company signed a publishing deal with Sega for a new game.

== Career ==
=== Early career ===
In 1986, Carr attended art college, and originally wanted to be a film maker. His career in game development began when he was inspired by titles such as Elite and Little Computer People, and liked the ability to manipulate the world and its people. He obtained a Higher National Diploma in graphic design. He applied for a job at a company called Palace Films, but was assigned to the software department instead. At Palace Software, Carr worked on the Barbarian series.

=== Bullfrog Productions (1989–1998) ===
In 1989, Carr joined Bullfrog Productions, where he worked as lead artist on Powermonger and Populous II. He was Bullfrog's sixth employee. Palace were losing money due to an increase in its films' costs, and a colleague showed him screenshots of Populous, which Carr thought "amazing". Carr considered games such as Powermonger and Populous Bullfrog's forte. He also worked on Theme Park, which Carr hated: "I just didn't get it. I thought it was a dreadful idea", he stated. Peter Molyneux, managing director of Bullfrog and producer of the game, wanted colourful graphics to appeal to a Japanese market, but Carr thought he had "lost the plot". He left Bullfrog in 1993 and joined The Bitmap Brothers, where he worked on The Chaos Engine 2. Carr later regretted this, and called himself "a dickhead". He also described Theme Park as "an absolute classic".

He returned in 1995 with the intention of working on Dungeon Keeper, but ended up working on Theme Hospital instead, as lead artist. Carr was initially disappointed at this: "Great! A sequel to the game I left the company for in the first place!" he said. He did not leave again due to the success of Theme Park. During research for Theme Hospital, he, along with the project leader Mark Webley, made visits to Royal Surrey County Hospital and Frimley Park Hospital. During a visit, Carr and Webley were watching an operation, and Carr was distracting the surgeon through excitement. The surgeon ordered them out, and Carr then had the idea of making Theme Hospital feature made-up illnesses, due to them considering hospitals monotonous.

=== Mucky Foot Productions (1998–2003) ===
Carr left Bullfrog again in 1998 to join Mucky Foot Productions, who considered him "one of the most talented and experienced artists in the computer games industry". He was the company's managing director. Carr stated that Mucky Foot's Startopia is his favourite game that he had worked on, due to its humour and simulation.

=== Lionhead Studios (2003–2015) ===
Carr joined Lionhead Studios in 2003, and became the executive producer of The Movies. At a press event in Barcelona, Molyneux asked Carr to demonstrate the production of a sequel using the game's script-writing function, a feature which did not exist. Describing the event, he said Molyneux "threw me under the bus", and also said that there was a piece that said Carr did not know how to play the game. Carr speculated that this was an attempt by Molyneux to force the implementation of a feature. Carr was afterwards assigned to Project Milo, and Microsoft approached Lionhead seeking to use its camera technology. After Molyneux left Lionhead, Carr became the company's most senior developer. By September 2012, Carr had become Lionhead's chief creative officer, and was the creative director of Fable: The Journey. He was also an Executive Producer at Microsoft Game Studios.

=== Two Point Studios (2016–present) ===
On 14 September 2015, Carr departed Lionhead. A Microsoft spokesperson thanked Carr for his contributions and described him as "a great friend and colleague". In 2016, Carr and Webley founded a studio called Two Point Studios. On 30 May 2017, Two Point Studios signed a publishing deal with Sega. Carr stated that they are "really excited" to be working with Sega, and expressed confidence that they will be able to create "something special". On 16 January 2018, this was revealed to be Two Point Hospital, a spiritual sequel to Theme Hospital.

== Awards ==
In 2011, Molyneux felt Carr deserved a Lifetime Achievement honour from the Game Developers Choice Awards.
