= Renegade Software =

UK-based games publisher

- Company type: Defunct
- Industry: Video game publisher
- Founded: 1991
- Defunct: 1997
- Fate: Merged into GT Interactive
- Headquarters: UK
- Key people: Bitmap Brothers
- Products: Gods; Magic Pockets; Cadaver: The Payoff; The Chaos Engine
- Parent: Time Warner Interactive (1995–1996); GT Interactive (1996–1997)

Renegade Software was a UK-based games publisher, founded in 1991 by the Bitmap Brothers.

Initially, the Bitmap Brothers used the new label to publish their own games, after they had become dissatisfied with the practices of publishing companies (their previous games were published by Mirrorsoft). Their stated goal was to give game developers more artistic freedom and more recognition. One of the first games released by Renegade Software was Magic Pockets, for which they had struck a deal with music publisher Rhythm King to include a Betty Boo song in the game.

Later Renegade also published games by other developers and went on as one of the successful independent publishers of its time, until it was acquired by Time Warner in 1995 to become "Warner Interactive Entertainment Ltd", still publishing under the Renegade label. before being merged with the European arm of Time Warner Interactive in the same year, rebranding as Warner Interactive Europe. Subsequently, in November 1996, the entirety of Warner Interactive Europe (including Northampton-based Time Warner Interactive Ltd, and Renegade itself) was sold to GT Interactive and the Renegade label ceased to exist.

== Games ==
- Gods (1991)
- Magic Pockets (1991)
- Cadaver: The Payoff (1991)
- Sensible Soccer: European Champions (1992)
- Sensible Soccer: European Champions: 92/93 Edition (1992)
- Fire & Ice (1992)
- The Chaos Engine (1993)
- Uridium 2 (1993)
- Turrican 3 (1993)
- Elfmania (1994)
- International Sensible Soccer (1994)
- Ruff 'n' Tumble (1994)
- Sensible World of Soccer (1994)
- Flight of the Amazon Queen (1995)
- Harpoon Classic (1995)
- Virocop (1995)
- Sensible World of Soccer '96/'97 (1996)
- Sensible World of Soccer: European Championship Edition (1996)
- The Chaos Engine 2 (1996)
- Z (1996)
