= Mark Webley =

Games developer

- Born: November 1963 (age 62–63)
- Occupation: Video game developer
- Known for: Theme Hospital; Black & White
- Notable work: Theme Hospital; Two Point Hospital

Mark Webley is a British video game developer, known for working with developers such as Peter Molyneux and Gary Carr for Bullfrog Productions and later Lionhead Studios (which he co-founded) on projects including Theme Hospital and Black & White. In 2012, he took over as head of Lionhead after Molyneux left, and in 2016, he founded a studio called Two Point Studios with Carr, which has signed a publishing deal with Sega.

== Career ==
Webley began working with Molyneux in 1992. He was a programmer on Theme Park, and headed a department at Bullfrog responsible for porting games to other platforms. He later became a designer, programmer, and project leader of Theme Hospital. Although he was new to making original games, he picked the project from a list provided by Molyneux. For research, he and Carr visited hospitals such as the Royal Surrey County Hospital and Frimley Park Hospital. During a visit to Frimley Park, they were watching an operation when they made a fuss and distracted the surgeon, who called the pair "bloody idiots" and ordered them out. It was around this time when it was decided that the game should not be realistic, but Webley did not initially like the idea of using made up ailments. Webley improved an animation editor written by Molyneux and called it the Complex Engine.

Webley held weekly meetings at a pub, in which he provided lists of tasks. It was realised that the game was complete during one such meeting, and it was released in 1997 to widespread critical acclaim: it sold four million copies, remained in the charts (it reached number one) for over a decade. According to Steve Jackson, Webley was "chuffed to bits" about Theme Hospital's success. The game also attracted some controversy: there was an article in The Daily Telegraph that said "Sick computer game used by British Medical Association to train senior management", NHS bosses complained about the game, and there was a mention in the Houses of Parliament. Webley appeared on some radio programmes to defend against these claims.

After Theme Hospital, Webley co-founded Lionhead Studios with Molyneux, Jackson, and Tim Rance. Webley and Molyneux came up with the name, which the company shared with Webley's pet hamster. The hamster died shortly afterwards, and the studio was briefly renamed Red Eye Studios, but the name was shortly thereafter reverted to Lionhead. Around this time, Molyneux described Webley as "one of the best people in the industry". Webley worked on Black & White as a programmer and project manager, and also provided voices for the Missionary Song on the game's first island along with Russell Shaw. Before he became the project manager, he worked on the creature's artificial intelligence on a testbed version.

On 3 May 2011, Webley was elected as a director to The Independent Game Developers' Association board. By this time, he was Lionhead's chief operating officer.

In 2012, following Molyneux's departure from the company, Webley became head of Lionhead, He quit and was replaced by Scott Henson the following year. In 2016, Webley founded Two Point Studios with Carr. The following year, on 30 May, it was announced that the company had signed a publishing deal with Sega for a game revealed on 16 January 2018 to be Two Point Hospital, a spiritual successor to Theme Hospital.

In 2011, Molyneux believed that Webley was worthy of Game Developers Choice Awards' Lifetime Achievement honour.

== Personal life ==
As of July 1997, Webley is Peter Molyneux's brother-in-law.
