= Z: Steel Soldiers =

2001 video game

- Developer(s): Bitmap Brothers (Note: Steam, Android, and iOS versions developed by TickTock Games.)
- Publisher(s): Eon Digital Entertainment (Note: Steam, Android, and iOS versions published by Kavcom and KISS.): AU: SCi Games
- Platform(s): Windows, iOS, Android
- Release: Windows: UK: 8 June 2001; NA: 15 June 2001; AU: 4 August 2001; iOS: WW: 16 April 2015; Android: WW: 29 July 2015
- Genre(s): Real-time strategy
- Mode(s): Single-player, multiplayer

Z: Steel Soldiers (originally released for Microsoft Windows simply as Steel Soldiers in North America) is a real-time strategy game released by the Bitmap Brothers in 2001 for the Windows platform and later by Kavcom Limited and KISS for Android and iOS in 2015. It is the sequel of their earlier game Z, and follows the same futuristic military science fiction storyline and battlefield gameplay. The graphics are enhanced from 2D to 3D.

As a result of a breach in peace negotiations, players take control of one side as a leader of an army of robots. Playing the game primarily involves fending off robust opponents during battles to control a location, whilst expanding one's forces. Objectives are met by occupying and holding territory rather than the more typical method of harvesting resources.

Despite featuring solid fundamentals and gaining mixed or average reviews the game had minimal impact. While only receiving one gaming magazine award and garnering some criticism upon its release, the title was still an important technological advance for the development team.

== Plot ==
Steel Soldiers is plot driven, unlike the original game, which had little or no plot and consisted of two sides fighting each other for no given reason, while the game cutscenes were focused on comical, humorous situations. After 509 years of conflict MegaCom Corporation (red) and TransGlobal Empires (blue) are set to make peace and sign a treaty; in preparation, forces on both sides have reduced their military presence to a skeleton regiment. The culmination of the peace treaty is the removal of both forces from the contested territory on Planet Rigal. The plot was written by Martin Pond. As the game is played it progresses with elements of intrigue and conspiracy.

The peace initiative is brokered personally by Commander Keeler and TransGlobal's premier, Commander Rieman. After a court martial judgement, the recently demoted Captain Zod, previously Commander Zod in the original Z, has been sending patrols into the demilitarized zone to spy upon the TransGlobal Empires. The scouts Brad (one of the pilot robots from the original Z; the other one, Allan, is staying in the campbase) and Clarke find a secret landing strip and promptly shoot down a transport ship after this discovery. The game begins with Zod sending in forces on a mission to retrieve the two missing scouts and find out "what the hell is going on", during which they find a broken box with the word "Omega" on it. Brad and Clarke's radio remains silent and although Zod lacks the proper authority, he is confident the peace agreement will remain intact but his aide Lassar is more concerned.

== Gameplay ==
Developers wanted an accessible strategy game combined with the immediacy of an arcade title. Consequently, the game was designed so a player could get into the action as quickly as possible. Z: Steel Soldiers sports a humorous comic book style with a realistic 3D environment. These graphics are best displayed on a moderately fast or recently purchased computer although game options allow playing the game on older Pentium II systems. This title is not compatible with Windows Vista.

The game features the ability to scroll, rotate, zoom and tilt the isometric viewing position to gain a better perspective. There is a high level of graphical detail such as reflections, shadows, weather effects and other environmental factors that can slow the frame rate on low end PCs.

The game has an advanced artificial intelligence that makes holding defensive positions central to completing each mission. There are 30 missions on six different worlds including desert, forest, volcanic, ice, archipelago and wasteland types. Each type of world has varying wildlife and lighting effects. This sequel adds aircraft and water vessels to the units available. With the completion of missions comes the introduction of new buildings and armored units including rocket launchers, bombers, helicopters and tanks.

When the game is paused players can scroll across the playing area, but places not under their control will not display enemy buildings and unit commands may not be issued. There are three difficulty levels - easy, medium and hard. Steel Soldiers has no tutorial, however the CD-ROM contains a 59-page game manual. The background music was designed to heighten the game's intensity. The game has a high score table and the ability to load and save games. There are options for changing the screen resolution, a gamma correction level setting and mouse sensitivity sliders. A free single-player demo is available for download. Skirmish mode is a customisable secondary play mode based on a series of separate maps to the missions. Multiplayer games occur on another twenty additional maps.

MegaCom ground forces overtake a TransGlobal Command Centre

Players control a group of robotic soldiers and vehicles in a two-sided war. At the start of each mission the current scenario and objectives are outlined. Level objectives vary considerably compared to the original from "Capture Aircraft Hangars and Shipyards" to "reach the EVAC point within a time limit". Some operations are timed with a countdown. Other mission duties are securing a landing area, to capture research facilities and evacuate personnel. The Command Centre is the headquarters and functions as a communications hub. If this building is destroyed the mission ends in failure.

The gameplay is based around fast-paced battle action without resource gathering. Winning the game requires speed and sound blitzkrieg tactics. The main aim is to gain territory by securing a sector after touching a flag. Each mission begins with an introduction that includes a discussion of the goals and a preview across a sweeping landscape, briefly revealing geographical features and approaches to some strategically important flag locations. The more territory a player gains, the greater the number of units that may be built and provides more land for the construction of buildings. Unoccupied buildings that are neutral are owned with control of the sector. Each flag has a number between 1 and 5 depicted upon it. The number represents a multiplier for the amount of credits a player will draw from that territory, each minute, when captured. Credits are used at factory buildings and research facilities to construct robots.

Other activities include canceling orders, building bunkers and gun turrets, issuing repair tasks and selling buildings for credits. Players have the ability to queue commands and set way points so that newly created units can automatically move to a location once built. Each unit and structure in Z:Steel Soldiers has a damage indicator. Colored radius rings mark line of sight limits and weapon range boundaries for the currently selected unit. Collapsed status panels include the Message and Information Panel from a leader cam (overhead view), a Unit Info View Panel and Minimap Panel displaying which territories are held by the TransGlobal Empires, MegaCom Corporation or are neutral. These panels are used to coordinate army unit movements, view mission goals and troop statistics.

== Development ==
On 24 August 2000, the Bitmap Brothers announced a deal with EON Digital Entertainment to publish a sequel to Z, then given a working title of Z2. This was after the developers had secured all rights to Z2 from the publisher GT Interactive. The Bitmap Brothers wanted to cater to both fans of the original and to players familiar with the RTS genre. Cool Beans Productions produced several animations, presented as cut scenes between a few of the missions.

This release was the first after a long break in titles for the pc, by the developers and as such was highly anticipated. Developers linked the delay to the substantial improvements between versions. Originally the game was to be released in late February 2001. After its initial release in June, several patches were released to fix a number of bugs and other minor tweaks were made.

The Gaming Director for the Bitmap Brothers, Jamie Barber has explained that the development of Z:Steel Soldiers was fundamental to the creation of the more well-known World War II: Frontline Command.

== Reception ==
Reception

Aggregate score
Aggregator	Score
Metacritic	70/100

Review scores
Publication	Score
AllGame	2/5
Computer Gaming World	2/5
Eurogamer	7 out of 10
Game Informer	6.25 out of 10
GameSpot	6.8 out of 10
GameSpy	88%
GameZone	6.6 out of 10
IGN	8 out of 10
Next Generation	3/5
PC Gamer (US)	66%
PC Zone	90%

After it was released the game received "average" reviews according to the review aggregation website Metacritic. A majority described the game as a fun strategy game with great graphics. A PC Zone review awarded a Classic Award to Steel Soldiers and concluded that the game's strong points were the sharp artificial intelligence, good use of ambient sounds and well-designed maps.

A smaller number of reviews were less flattering describing the experience as standard, as one that would bore a veteran RTS gamer. Z: Steel Soldiers is similar to other pc strategy games with a military science fiction theme including Ground Control (2000), StarCraft (1998) and Warzone 2100 (1999). Several reviewers commented that Steel Soldiers offers nothing new to the genre.

Z: Steel Soldiers had a weak impact, compared to the more popular Warcraft II and Command & Conquer. A few reviewers noted tiny annoyances and that the game was predictable while others described the games imperfections as significant. The game has been criticised over its lack of diversity, clumsy interface and generic sounds. One review described the game as old-school, formulaic and lacking distinctive graphics. The humour has been characterized as caustic and witty. At least one reviewer suggested a game-speed toggle would have been a useful addition for players.

John Lee reviewed the PC version of the game for Next Generation, rating it three stars out of five, and stated that "A boisterous 3D realtime strategy melee, with action, robot management, and rugged terrain, but you've seen much of it elsewhere."

== Ports ==
Kavcom Limited released Z: Steel Soldiers for the Android in 2014 and iOS in 2015.

== See also ==
- List of strategy video games
