= Theme Hospital =

1997 video game

- Developers: Bullfrog Productions (MS-DOS, Windows); Krisalis Software (PlayStation)
- Publisher: Electronic Arts
- Producer: Mark Webley
- Designer: Mark Webley
- Artist: Gary Carr
- Writers: James Leach; Sean Masterson; Neil Cook
- Composers: Russell Shaw; Adrian Moore
- Platforms: MS-DOS; Windows; PlayStation
- Release: MS-DOS, Windows: WW: 28 March 1997; PlayStation: EU: February 1998; NA: 16 April 1998; JP: 18 June 1998
- Genre: Business simulation
- Modes: Single-player, multiplayer

Theme Hospital is a business simulation game developed by Bullfrog Productions and published by Electronic Arts in 1997 for MS-DOS and Microsoft Windows compatible PCs in which players design and operate a privately owned hospital with the goal of curing patients of fictitious comical ailments. The game is the thematic successor to Theme Park, also produced by Bullfrog, and the second installment in their Theme series, and part of their Designer Series. The game is noted for its humour, and contains numerous references to pop culture.

Peter Molyneux and James Leach came up with the idea of creating a Theme game based on a hospital, but Molyneux was not directly involved in development due to his work on Dungeon Keeper. Designers originally planned to include four distinct gameplay modes corresponding to historical time periods, but this was dropped due to time pressures on the team. Multiplayer support with up to four players was added in a patch. The game received a generally positive reception, with reviewers praising the graphics and humour in particular. Theme Hospital was a commercial success, selling over 4 million copies worldwide, and was ported to the PlayStation in 1998. A Saturn version was in development, but cancelled. The game was re-released on GOG.com in 2012 and Origin in 2014, and the PlayStation version was released on the PlayStation Network in Europe in 2008, Japan in 2009, and North America in 2010. Revival attempts have been made with the development of open-source remakes such as CorsixTH.

== Gameplay ==
A typical hospital

The player is required to build an environment that will attract patients with comical diseases and then treat them while tending to their needs. The game has a somewhat dark sense of humour, similar to that of its predecessor, Theme Park. Diseases include Bloaty Head (which swells the patient's head), King Complex (which forces the patient to impersonate Elvis Presley), and Alien DNA (which transforms the patient into an alien).

Starting with an empty hospital, the player must build rooms and hire doctors, nurses, handymen and receptionists. Each staff member has statistics that affect their performance, and doctors can be trained so their statistics will increase. Rooms include GP's Offices, Psychiatric rooms, Operating Theatres and Pharmacies, and are built by placing down a blueprint, assigning the location of doors and windows, and then placing down required and optional pieces of furniture. The player may also set up items such as benches, fire extinguishers, and plants in the open corridor spaces provided. The player is given time to build the hospital at the start of each level before patients start coming. Patients see a GP in his office who either provides a diagnosis or sends them for further evaluation in a specialised diagnosis room. Once a diagnosis is made, the patient will be sent for treatment. While a few rooms are available at the start of the game, the rest must be researched. Some rooms, such as the Inflator room—where patients with Bloaty Head are treated—contain machines which require regular maintenance by a handyman: if neglected for too long, they will explode, killing all occupants of the room. Doctors must have acquired certain specialist skills to practise in certain rooms, such as the Research room (used to research new rooms and cures, and improve existing ones) and Operating Theatre. There are rooms that only staff use, such as the Staff Room and the Training room, while patients also require certain rooms such as toilet facilities.

Diagnosis and treatment cost patients money, and the player can change hospital policy, including the amount of diagnosis patients require. This can be set to over 100 per cent to force patients to have further unnecessary diagnoses. Other policies include when staff can go on breaks and whether they can leave rooms, and loans can be taken out. From time to time, events such as emergencies (in which patients arrive and must be cured within a time limit or they will die), and epidemics (in which a disease spreads rapidly) occur. During the latter, the player can attempt to cover it up by curing all affected patients before a health inspector turns up. If the player fails, they are fined and must face a damaged reputation, a statistic that shows how well the hospital is doing and affects the flow of patients. VIPs may also occasionally ask to tour the hospital; if impressed, the player is granted a cash bonus, a reputation increase, or both. There is an advisor who keeps the player informed about what is going on. Rats may infest the hospital, and the player is able to shoot them with the cursor.

Although the player has no direct control over the patients, they have some influence over whether to evict them from the hospital and in determining what to do with them when given a choice by the staff. The player can pick up any staff member in the building and move them (mainly to reassign them to another room or send them to get rest), or dismiss them if they argue about pay or are no longer required. The player may force patients to take a chance at a cure for their suspected disease before diagnosis is complete (at the risk of killing the patient), and rearrange queues.

The player competes against computer rivals named after famous computers, real and fictional: these include Holly from Red Dwarf and Deep Thought from The Hitchhiker's Guide to the Galaxy. The game is timed with days of the year, and at the end of each year (game time), players are judged on their performances, and may be given trophies, reputation increases, or cash bonuses.

Each level has set goals in the fields of financial attainment, hospital reputation, patients cured, and hospital value. Holding negative funds or allowing sufficient patients to die will bring about losing requirements. When the goals have been met the player has the option to move on to a new, more elaborate hospital with tougher winning conditions and more diseases present, or stick with their current one. If enough rats have been shot, the player is taken to a special level whose goal is to shoot as many as possible.

A patch was released that fixed bugs and added support for Serial Cable, Modem, and IPX/SPX network gaming (with up to four players) in the Windows version, and a difficulty setting. In multiplayer, each player has a colour, which patients will wear to distinguish from those of other players. "Litter Bombs" are featured, allowing players to spread litter around other players' hospitals, while staff members can be persuaded to work for other players, and there are "Mini Missions", with instructions for players to perform. Players are also able to chat with each other during a game.

== Development ==
Theme Hospital took over two years to develop. The idea came from Peter Molyneux and journalist James Leach, who explored the possibility of other Theme games while discussing Theme Park. Leach suggested a hospital, and Molyneux was enthusiastic about the idea. Development began when the designer Mark Webley selected Theme Hospital from a list of possible games put together by Molyneux, and Webley, along with the artist Gary Carr, visited the Royal Surrey County Hospital, Great Ormond Street Hospital, and Frimley Park Hospital for research and inspiration. Carr was initially displeased at the prospect of working on Theme Hospital: he had previously left Bullfrog to work for The Bitmap Brothers because he did not have faith in Theme Park. He chose to return based on his belief that he would work on Dungeon Keeper, which he was eager to do. Initially, Theme Hospital was to feature real diseases, but these were replaced with fictional, comedic afflictions as it was decided that the game's maladies should not be too realistic: the team were faced with the dilemma of having to make the hospital fun and interesting, as Webley stated that theme parks are "colourful" compared to hospitals, and Carr believed that hospital rooms looked very similar and that it was hard to tell what each machine does.

It was during a hospital visit (after witnessing an operation that they were ordered out of because they were distracting the surgeon) that they came up with the idea of using made-up illnesses and cures: Carr considered death "quite sad" and believed that illness was not a popular subject. He stated that using made-up illnesses gave them "creative freedom", which he believed was essential. Webley said that Carr was concerned that using real diseases might be considered distasteful. According to Carr, the team were aiming for humour rather than gore. During the initial stages of programming, Bullfrog hired James Leach, who wrote the game's text and came up with the diseases. Molyneux was not directly involved in the game's production as he was then working on Dungeon Keeper.

The graphic design was decided to be modelled from those of cartoons, and a goal was to have two thousand character animations. Another artist was hired to complete the graphics on time, and the team ultimately ended up with four. Fellow artist Andy Bass had difficulty getting the Kit Kat graphics correct. He said they did not have the right colour, so Carr tweaked the palette. Bass modelled the vending machine that would use the Kit Kat graphics and used 3D Studio to render it into the game palette, which he then edited using Deluxe Paint. By spring 1996, around half of the illnesses and animations were complete, the introduction and cutscenes were mostly complete, and the programming of the management system was almost finished. By early 1997, all that was left was refining the difficulty levels.

The game deviates from the NHS model; Webley and Carr decided that players should think of the hospital as a business, with profit highly important. The team, who worked in offices near the Royal Surrey County Hospital, drew some inspirations from Theme Park and borrowed a great deal of code. Webley explained that this was an "obvious starting point" as he had been a programmer on Theme Park, and that the systems had been rewritten by the time Theme Hospital was complete. A program which facilitated animation was built upon by Webley, who dubbed it the Complex Engine. There were not many meetings, and Webley took the team to the pub weekly with a list of tasks to perform. Webley explained that the way the team worked meant that only they could perform their assigned duties otherwise they would not get done, effectively giving members ownership of their parts of the game. It was during one such meeting that the team realised the game was complete. The disease called King Complex was to be called Elvis Impersonator, but Elvis's estate owned the rights. Bloaty Head was based on an allergic reaction Molyneux had, when his face became an "alarming size".

According to Leach, the volume of work was small. A big problem was that the team had too many ideas, and insufficient time to implement them all. For example, other diseases were planned; one of these was Animal Magnetism, which would see patients with attached animals which would have to be cut away. Another idea that was not implemented was the possibility of four separate in-game eras: futuristic, mediaeval, Victorian, and modern. The game was originally to have players begin in the mediaeval zone, and progress to more modern ones. By May 1996, the idea of the other time periods had been deemed "prohibitive" due to the amount of graphics required. Carr later stated that the game did not need the other eras, and that the team was small enough to make things up as they went along. Carr was also afraid that if they had produced a design document, Electronic Arts would have considered the omission of the other eras feature cutting. An idea that Molyneux pushed Webley's team to implement was a screen that enabled players to mix coloured chemicals to apply them to diseases. Accessibility was also a concern for the team: with so many options, it was felt that players could treat the game like work. The tester Jon Rennie simplified the game from the original design; Webley was keen for players to be able to begin play without a long tutorial.

Theme Hospital was released on 28 March 1997 (although it was previously due for release in November 1996), and is part of Bullfrog's Designer Series. The game attracted some controversy from NHS managers, the Houses of Parliament, and The Daily Telegraph, who published an article criticising the game as "sick" and said that the British Medical Association was using it to train management staff. The NHS argued that the game mocked hospital management. Webley was invited to appear on a local radio station; he did not consider the game to make light of real-world health management because it featured fictional diseases rather than real ones. Theme Hospital was a commercial success, which surprised Bullfrog and Electronic Arts. It repeatedly appeared in the top five of budget charts and sold over 4 million copies. In 2014, Molyneux stated that he wanted the game to make a comeback, and described Theme Hospital as "a great game that I and many people remember".

Original releases' cover art used a green cross on a white background, which Bullfrog did not have the right to use. The artwork was mistakenly approved because it was faxed in black and white, and had to be recalled. Later releases changed the cross to a star. Despite its rejection, the cross version is available in more recent formats.

=== Sound ===
The music and sound effects were produced by Russell Shaw and Adrian Moore. Moore used Sound Forge to develop the sound effects. Some (such as the snooker balls) were taken directly from its library, and others (including the treatment machines) were created by mixing sounds together. Some machine sounds were created by mixing the sounds of electric egg mixer with that of a hydraulic lifter. The farting sounds were recorded when Moore was working with bands including T'Pau, Prefab Sprout, and Seal at a recording studio: he did so as a joke, but they were useful for Theme Hospital.

=== Ports and re-releases ===
A PlayStation port of Theme Hospital was developed by Krisalis Software and released by Electronic Arts in 1998. The PlayStation version was released as a download on the PlayStation 3 and PlayStation Portable from PlayStation Store in Europe on 31 January 2008, in North America on 31 August 2010, and in Japan on 28 October 2009. Later PlayStation Vita version become available on PSN exclusively for Japan. This version is no longer available for purchase in Europe since September 2014, after becoming free for a short period of time. A Sega Saturn version (titled Sim Hospital as of October 1995) was in development and due for release in mid-1996, but was cancelled.

In 2012, Theme Hospital was re-released on the digital distribution service GOG.com. In January 2015, Origin distributed Theme Hospital free for a limited time through their "On the House" programme. It was distributed a second time through the "On the House" programme in September the same year, as a temporary replacement to Command & Conquer: Red Alert 2 due to an excessive number of requests for the latter. It was released a third time in selected countries in 2017 from 7 March to 17 May as a replacement for Syberia 2.

An open-source remake, CorsixTH, improves the original game with features such as modern OS support, higher screen resolutions and a level editor. CorsixTH is available under the MIT Licence, and in 2012, a version was released on Android, available on the Google Play Store.

On November 5th 2026, the game was made available to purchase on Steam.

== Reception ==
Reception

Review scores
Publication	Score
Computer Gaming World	4/5 (PC)
Computer and Video Games	4/5 (PC)
Edge	8/10 (PC); 7/10 (PlayStation)
GameSpot	5.5/10 (PC); 7.3/10 (PlayStation)
IGN	7/10 (PlayStation)
Next Generation	4/5 (PC); 4/5 (PS)
PC Gamer (UK)	85% (PC)
PC PowerPlay	90% (PC)
Coming Soon Magazine	82% (PC)
The Electric Playground	6.5/10 (PC)
Eurogamer	7/10 (PlayStation)
Jeuxvideo.com	17/20 (PC)
Absolute PlayStation	79% (PlayStation)
PC Zone	91% (PC)
PC Power	92% (PC)
Génération 4	5/5 (PC)

Theme Hospital received positive reviews. Critics noted the strong gameplay, detailed graphics, satisfying comedic tone, and voice acting performance, but fell conflicted on music, repetition, the artificial intelligence, and the user interface.

The British magazine PC Gamer's Steve Owen praised the game's challenge and "cute" graphics, but criticised the interface. Frederick Claude of Coming Soon Magazine also complimented the graphics as "highly detailed", and the "very simple" user interface, although he criticised the repetitiveness and lack of multiplayer support that would later be introduced with a patch. GameSpot's Trent Ward agreed about the graphics too, lauding them as "fantastic", and also complimented the "realistic" voice acting performance, and the humour, although he criticised the artificial intelligence as "flawed". His conclusion was that the game "just doesn't fly". Bonnie James of The Electric Playground also liked the graphics, as well as the "lovely" opening sequence, but found the music "horrible". Computer and Video Games's Alex Huhtala concurred about the graphics, describing them as "large and colourful", but commented that the humour wears off after a while, although he felt it is good to begin with.

Another reviewer who liked the graphics was Dawn Jepsen of Computer Gaming World, who also praised the humour, especially the "wackiness" of the illnesses, and described the game as "delightful and absorbing". The humour was also approved by a reviewer of Jeuxvideo.com, who, like other reviewers, lauded the graphics, by describing them as colourful. Next Generation's reviewer echoed others' views about the humour, describing it as something they had come to expect from Bullfrog, but criticised the lack of multiplayer support. The humour was again praised by a reviewer of PC Power, who said that the ailments enabled Bullfrog to have "hilarious" cures. The "thoroughly engrossing" gameplay, and the graphics were also complimented: it was stated that the bright colours gave hospitals a "cheerful look". Theme Hospital was described as a "fantastic title". Other comments from critics included Edge's reviewer's compliments of the balance of patients and illnesses against the player's resources, and his belief that the game is a refinement of its genre, and PC Zone's reviewers commendation of the detail: it was remarked that it gets players "helplessly immersed", and the game was awarded the PC Zone Classic accolade. Éric Ernaux of Génération 4 said the quality is "remarkable for a game of its genre".

The PlayStation version's main problem, as noted by critics, was the controls. It was cited by reviewers from GameSpot, IGN, Eurogamer, Edge, and GamePro as a major downside. GamePro explained, "Since the game was developed for mouse control, the directional pad's response is a bit jerky." Its reception was not entirely negative: James Mielke of GameSpot also commended the addictiveness, and described the port as "almost completely intact". GamePro found the dry humor was the game's shining quality, offering the player a consistent source of laughter through the steep challenges. IGN agreed with others about the humour, by praising it as "wonderfully sick". It was further commented that the game's "brilliance" made it a "must-have". The sentiments about the controls and humour were echoed by Dan Whitehead of Eurogamer, who reviewed it on the PlayStation Network. Absolute PlayStation's reviewers had a mixed view about the graphics: they criticised the resolution and colour palette, but complimented the sprites. The user interface was criticised as being reminiscent of a 16-bit game. Despite the criticisms, they agreed with others about the humour, and described the game as "a blast to play". Next Generation's reviewer lauded the depth and accessibility.

In 1997, Theme Hospital appeared alongside Theme Park at #61 on PC Gamer's list of top 100 games, and was named in April as a Game of Distinction.

=== Legacy ===
Oxymoron Games made Project Hospital, which is their take on Theme Hospital. Two Point Studios, a studio founded by Webley and Carr, developed a similar game Two Point Hospital, a spiritual sequel to Theme Hospital. Both games were released in 2018: Two Point Hospital was released on 30 August, while Project Hospital was released on 30 October. Two Point Hospital features the Animal Magnetism disease, that was originally cut from Theme Hospital before release.

== See also ==
- Hospital Tycoon, a similar hospital simulation game
- Two Point Hospital, a spiritual sequel to Theme Hospital
