= Two Point Museum =

- Developer: Two Point Studios
- Publisher: Sega
- Director: Ben Huskins
- Producer: Jo Koehler
- Designer: Luke Finlay-Maxwell
- Programmers: Ben Hymers, Ben Perry
- Engine: Unity
- Platforms: Microsoft Windows; macOS; Linux; PlayStation 5; Xbox Series X/S; Nintendo Switch 2
- Release: 4 March 2025; Switch 2 October 28, 2025
- Genre: Business simulation
- Mode: Single-player

Two Point Museum is a business simulation video game developed by Two Point Studios and published by Sega. It is the sequel to Two Point Hospital (2018) and Two Point Campus (2022). The game was released for Windows PC, PlayStation 5, and Xbox Series X and Series S on 4 March 2025. A Nintendo Switch 2 version was released on 28 October 2025.

== Gameplay ==
Unlike previous games in the series, players can use partition wall to separate exhibit halls.

Similar to its predecessors, Two Point Museum is a business simulation game. In the game, the player assumes the role of a museum manager who must design a museum, build up its collection of exhibits, and ensure its smooth operations. Unlike previous games in the series requiring players to build specific rooms, Two Point Museum allows players to build partition walls, providing them with more flexibility. The player's goals are to generate cash and educate guests. A well-decorated and well-explained exhibit will generate Buzz, thus encouraging guests to donate to the museum. Players also need to build amenities such as gift shops, restrooms, cafeterias and staff rooms to keep both staff members and guests content. Players can also build workshops for displaying interactive exhibits. There are various types of visitors, each of whom has their own preferences for exhibits. Exhibits can be analyzed to unlock more knowledge, allowing information stands to educate visitors more effectively. Guided tours can be organized to ensure the demands of visitors are met. By catering to the needs of all visitors, the museum will receive more donations and receive strong reviews.

Players need to recruit assistants for running the ticketing office and shops, security guards for maintaining order in the museum, deterring thieves and mischievous children from vandalizing the exhibits, and emptying the donation boxes, and custodians for keeping the museum clean. Experts are also needed for maintaining the quality of each exhibits. They can also be dispatched to locations around the world to collect valuable artifacts. Each expedition unlocks a new artifact, which is revealed to the player when they are brought to the museum. Some exhibits, such as dinosaur fossils, may require players to complete multiple expeditions before they are fully completed. However, some expeditions are dangerous to experts. They may be injured, or may disappear permanently. There are multiple museum themes, each with subcategories of exhibits. For instance, the prehistoric theme's frozen exhibits must be kept refrigerated.

As players progress in the game, their museum's ratings will improve. Unlike Hospital and Campus, which utilizes a three-star reward system, Museum utilizes an endless star scoring system encouraging players to expand their museums with new exhibits and themes. An artifact, once discovered, can be used in multiple museums. Locations are gradually unlocked as players complete various gameplay objectives, some of which are shared across museums.

== Development ==
Two Point Museum is the third game to be developed by British developer Two Point Studios. The idea for building a museum simulation game stemmed from Two Point's cofounder and technical director Ben Hymers. Museum was chosen as the game's main setting because the team was "immediately drawn to" the idea of collecting and curating artifacts, and enables players to have the creative freedom to build spaces that can inspire awe for visitors. As a result, the game also features significantly expanded building and customization tools. As with previous games in the series, Two Point Museum has a wacky tone, and Two Point included both exhibits that are grounded in reality, and those that are more outlandish, such as a frozen caveman who will come alive if the ice melts. Design director Ben Huskin added that the team ensured that none of the artefacts in the game had relations to real civilizations around the world, though they may reference real-world history in a "tongue-in-cheek" way.

The team also significantly changed the progression system. As players had to excavate individual artifacts for their museums instead of purchasing them from the market, the team wanted players to spend a longer time creating each museum, encouraging them to change and modify their layout and slowly expanding it. Mission objectives were also redesigned with the endless star scoring system, and progression is often shared across museum in an effort to keep players engaged with each museum they have built. According to lead designer Luke Finlay-Maxwell, each exhibit subcategory also has their own unique gameplay mechanics so that players are persistently faced with "new and interesting' challenges as they progress. Expeditions are introduced to add a new layer of strategy, as players have to manage manpower for each expedition, ensure their success, and resolve the negative consequences associated with each expedition.

== Release ==
Two Point Museum was announced in August 2024. The game was released for Windows PC, PlayStation 5, and Xbox Series X and Series S on 4 March 2025. It was released for the Nintendo Switch 2 on 28 October 2025.

=== Downloadable content ===
The game has received several free and paid content expansions. The first paid downloadable content pack titled Fantasy Finds was released in July 2025, adding a new location to explore with fantasy and medieval-themed artifacts to uncover. A second paid downloadable content pack titled Zooseum, which adds zoological exhibits along with a new museum site and explorable location, was released in December 2025. A third paid downloadable content pack titled Arty-Facts, which adds fine art exhibits and performing arts installations to the game was released in May 2026. A fourth paid downloadable content pack, Rides & Relics, which adds amusement park rides and rollercoasters, was released in October 2026.

The 5.0 update to the game released in August 2025, along with adding a new video game-themed location called the Digiverse Rift, introduced a collaboration with the game Dredge, adding items and exhibits from the horror fishing game that players can collect. Other collaborations have followed, including Vampire Survivors, Revenge of the Savage Planet, Angry Birds, Dave the Diver, Cult of the Lamb, and Little Kitty, Big City, each adding new items, exhibits and gameplay elements.

== Reception ==
Reception

Aggregate scores
Aggregator	Score
Metacritic	PS5: 83/100; Win: 84/100
OpenCritic	91% recommend

Review scores
Publication	Score
Eurogamer	4/5
Famitsu	33/40
GamesRadar+	4.5/5
Hardcore Gamer	3/5
IGN	9/10
PC Gamer (US)	85/100
PCGamesN	8/10
Push Square	7/10
Shacknews	9/10
TechRadar	4/5
Video Games Chronicle	4/5

Two Point Museum received "generally favorable" reviews from critics, according to review aggregator Metacritic. OpenCritic determined that 91% of critics recommended the game.

In Japan, four critics from Famitsu gave the game a total score of 33 out of 40.

=== Awards ===
Year	Award	Category	Result	Ref.
2025	Golden Joystick Awards	Best Audio Design	Nominated	
2025	The Game Awards 2025	Best Sim/Strategy Game	Nominated	
2026	22nd British Academy Games Awards	British Game	Nominated	
2026	22nd British Academy Games Awards	Family	Nominated	
