= Gods (video game) =

1991 video game

- European cover art by Simon Bisley
- Developer: The Bitmap Brothers
- Publishers: EU: Renegade Software; NA: Mindscape
- Designers: Eric Matthews; Steve Tall
- Programmer: Steve Tall
- Artist: Mark Coleman
- Composer: Nation 12
- Platforms: Amiga, Atari ST, Archimedes, MS-DOS, PC98, Genesis, Super NES
- Release: 1991–1992
- Genre: Platform
- Mode: Single-player

Gods is a platform game by The Bitmap Brothers released for the Amiga and Atari ST in 1991. The player is cast as Hercules in his quest to achieve immortality. It was ported to the Acorn Archimedes, Genesis/Mega Drive, PC98, Super Nintendo Entertainment System, and Atari Jaguar.

== Plot ==
Four guardians have invaded and usurped the citadel of the gods. The gods offer any hero who can succeed in retaking the citadel one favour. The hero who comes forth asks the gods as their favour to be granted a seat among them as an equal. The gods are only comforted by the hope the hero will fail. After the last boss is beaten, the gods prove true to their word and the last image is the hero becoming a being of light as he ascends to Mount Olympus.

== Gameplay ==
Precise and timed jumping are required to progress. Planning each move carefully yields better results health-wise than attempting to rush through a level, and there are some puzzles (often involving levers and objects) which require the player to go back and forth in the level, since there is only a four-space inventory where objects required to get bonuses (such as keys) or to complete a level can be carried. The console versions (particularly the Mega Drive/Genesis version) run at a considerably higher speed, which increases the difficulty level.

The console versions do not share the same opening theme music as the PC versions of the game. They do, however, have background music throughout the game, while the PC version only has background music throughout the game with a Roland LAPC-I.

There are several weapons available in the levels or to buy, and up to three of each can be used simultaneously. It is also possible to vary the focus of the weapons: to destroy more enemies at the same horizontal level as the player, a tight angle is advisable, but in levels with open spaces and enemies in higher places, a diffuse aim might prove more useful. There are also other weapons, such as bouncing axes that can be used to take on enemies at a lower level or fireballs.

The enemy AI adapts to the player position and their skill. Some rooms contain inaccessible items - smaller "thieves" show up from a passage in the wall, try to grab the item and bring it back to another point in the room or disappear with it. The player is able to obtain the item if they shoot the thief at the correct time. Bonuses are awarded for reaching certain parts of the level under a certain limit of time or number of lives, bringing an object to a room or simply by playing poorly, where the game helps the player.

There are four levels, each with a Guardian at the end. After completion of a level the player meets a trader, and depending on the wealth accumulated during the game (by catching diamond-shaped jewels or bags) can buy more powerful weapons or items (Xenon 2: Megablast uses the same idea).

== Development ==
As was common with Bitmap Brothers, an external musician assured the game score, this time John Foxx as Nation 12. The box cover illustration was designed by the British comic book artist Simon Bisley. The graphics were designed using the SpriteFX application. Versions for the Nintendo DS and PC Engine Super CD-ROM² were planned but never released. A Game Boy Advance version was also in development but cancelled immediately.

== Reception ==
Reception

Review scores
Publication	Score
Computer and Video Games	93%
Dragon	4/5
Datormagazin	97%
CU Amiga	93%
Zero	90%
Amiga Computing	90%
Amiga Format	90%
The One	93%

Computer Gaming World in 1992 named it one of the year's top four action games for "fast and furious arcade-style action [and] enough exploration and puzzle-solving to raise it above the typical action crowd".

== Legacy ==
A remastered version of the game, Gods Remastered, was developed by Robot Riot Games and released on 4 December 2018 for Microsoft Windows. It was then announced for the Xbox One and Steam, and released December 2019, followed by the Nintendo Switch and PlayStation 4, with 29 March 2020 given as the release date for the latter platforms. Licensing restrictions prevented the distribution of this remastered edition past 27 March 2022.
