= Project Hospital =

2018 video game

- Developer: Oxymoron Games
- Publisher: Oxymoron Games
- Engine: Unity
- Platforms: Microsoft Windows, MacOS, Linux
- Release: 30 October 2018
- Genre: Business simulation
- Mode: Single-player

Project Hospital is a 2018 business simulation game developed and published by Czech studio Oxymoron Games for Microsoft Windows, MacOS, and Linux operating systems. Players are tasked with building and operating a hospital and treating patients' illnesses.

== Gameplay ==
Project Hospital is a hospital simulation game that focuses on accurate medical procedures and management. The game has three tutorials, teaching the player the fundamentals of the game. Tasks include managing and hiring staff, and building. Building consists of laying down foundation, building walls, adding floor tiles, doors, and windows. Players also need to have to look over the patients heading in and out of their hospital.

== Expansions and DLCs ==
=== Doctor Mode ===
On 26 November 2019, Oxymoron released the first DLC for Project Hospital: the free Doctor Mode add-on. This DLC introduced the ability to control individual doctors, monitor their patients, and interact with a new insurance company, "Oopsee Corp." Players could also create custom characters, adding a new layer of personalization to the game.

=== Hospital Services ===
On 24 April 2020, the Hospital Services DLC was released, introducing new features like cafeterias, a pathology department, pharmacies, and staff training. As the first paid DLC, it expanded the game with new rooms designed to increase revenue and staffing. Additionally, the pathology department allows players to investigate patient deaths within the hospital, though it doesn't introduce any new diagnoses.

=== Department of Infectious Diseases ===
On 18 August 2020, the Department of Infectious Diseases DLC was released, and added many infectious diseases, and an Epidemiology department along with an alternative stretcher model and a more contemporary waiting chair.

=== Traumatology Department ===
On 20 October 2020, the Traumatology Department DLC was released and introduced new challenging events which let you deal with the consequences of different disasters, accidents or crime. This also included the Traumatology department. The DLC adds multiple objects such as the wheelchair, hi-tech hospital bed, an alternative more modern bedside table, a wall mounted heart monitor, a new equipment cabinet, and the helicopter.

== Reception ==
Reception

Aggregate score
Aggregator	Score
Metacritic	75/100

Review score
Publication	Score
GameStar	70/100

Project Hospital has received "generally favourable" reviews, according to review aggregator website Metacritic.

== See also ==
- Two Point Hospital
- Hospital Tycoon
- Theme Hospital
