= Z (video game) =

1996 video game

- Developer: The Bitmap Brothers
- Publishers: Renegade Software; Virgin Interactive Entertainment(MS-DOS); Sony Computer Entertainment (PlayStation); GT Interactive (Saturn)
- Platforms: MS-DOS, PlayStation, Saturn, Windows, Mac, iOS, Android, BlackBerry PlayBook
- Release: MS-DOS: EU: 24 August 1996; NA: 28 August 1996; PlayStation: EU: December 1997; Saturn: EU: April 1998; iOS; 13 July 2011
- Genre: Real-time strategy
- Modes: Single-player, multiplayer

Z is a real-time strategy video game by The Bitmap Brothers. It was initially published for MS-DOS in 1996 by Renegade Software, then ported to Mac, PlayStation, and Saturn. In Z, two armies of robots (red and blue) battle to conquer different planets.

A sequel, Z: Steel Soldiers, was published in 2001.

== Plot ==
A supply ship is adrift in space. Its occupants, two robots named Brad and Allan, are late delivering supplies for Commander Zod. Their mission sends them across five planets, fighting enemy soldiers. Only when the five planets are conquered does the party begin.

After the final level, Zod gets a promotion to Supreme Space Colonel. Zod and the other soldiers celebrate by drinking many cans of rocket fuel, getting sick. Zod boards the Supply Ship with Brad and Allan and shows them how to fly it. Zod uses the ship to pull acrobatic stunts in space, leaving Brad thrilled. When Allan pulls another can of rocket fuel from the box, he notices a "do not shake" warning on its side. He shakes it up and tosses it to Zod. When Zod opens the can, an explosion blows the ship apart. Brad and Allan are hurled off, and Zod's hat floats into deep space.

== Gameplay ==
A screenshot of Z (DOS version)

Unlike traditional real-time strategy (RTS) games, there is no resource collection, map exploration, or base building - the same principle that was introduced by Nether Earth, one of the RTS games' ancestors. Regions and structures within their borders that actually manufacture the units are captured by moving troops to their respective flags. All that is needed to do is to hold acquired position for a certain amount of time while the unit is manufacturing. The more regions are under the player's control, the less the time required. More powerful units take more time to construct.

The objective of the game is to eliminate the opponent by taking out their command fort, either by sending a unit to enter it, or by destroying it directly. Alternatively, destroying all of the opponent's units immediately wins the game.

At the start of every mission, each side is given control of their fort and a small group of units. A host of unmanned turrets and vehicles are usually scattered about the map and sending a robot to these will allow the player to add them to their army. However, the assigned robot will remain in the captured vehicle or turret as a pilot or a gunner, although he may be removed from the gun, effectively splitting him from his squad.

The game is significantly different from others of its type: for example, vehicle drivers can take damage from enemy fire, and if the driver is destroyed, the vehicle they were commandeering will be unmanned and can be captured by either side. Also, different robot types behave differently. More intelligent units such as snipers are less likely to pop up from a tank and expose themselves to fire.

The game starts off with simple, symmetric levels where the CPU starts with roughly the same hardware as the player. As the game progresses, the levels become more complex, demanding more skill to control all units effectively, and the computer gains an advantage in starting units. For example, the CPU's fort usually has substantially more powerful guard turrets. The computer also gains more logistic advantages. Combat takes place on several planets, with four missions on each. When one is successfully captured, a space ship transports the robot army to another.

== Release ==
The MS-DOS version is named Z and Z 95 is for Windows 95. Ports for the PlayStation and Saturn were released in 1997 and 1998 only in Europe. Both were handled by Krisalis Software and published by GT Interactive. Sony Computer Entertainment published the PS version in Europe. Even though the Saturn mouse was never released in Europe, the Saturn version of Z includes mouse support.

A mobile version of Z was developed by Peter Harrap and TickTock Games and was published by KavCom. It was released on iPhone and iPad in 2011, with further releases on BlackBerry Playbook, Android, and Kindle in 2012. The mobile version remake by TickTock Games was also released for Mac in 2012, and then published by Kiss Ltd and KavCom for Windows PC on Steam and GOG.com in July 4th of 2014.

There was also a "Directors cut version". There was a very limited number of these mostly given away at the launch party. There were only a couple of levels with this version and it featured "R" rated audio for the robot voices.

=== Difference between Z and Z 95 ===
There are few differences between the Z DOS version and the Z 95 version. Most of all Z 95 was made much more compatible with Windows 95 which was becoming more and more popular. Also some more levels were added to the so-called Expansion Kit. The Z DOS version has an interface for loading the game as its first step. In Z 95 the interface is still there but modified and is just a normal interface using APIs of Windows 95 without the eyecandy buttons. Z DOS version is much slower, which affects the game play, whereas the Z 95 version improves the speed and lets the game feel like a real time strategy field. Also, a few unit statistics were changed to improve the game's balance.

== Reception ==
Reception

Review scores
Publication	Score
GameSpot	7.2/10 (PC)
Next Generation	4/5 (PC)
PC Zone	92% (PC)
Sega Saturn Magazine	85% (SAT)

Reviewing the PC version, Chris Hudak of GameSpot called Z "the alcoholic, head-banging, gap-toothed, punch-drunk, inbred cousin of Command & Conquer." He particularly praised the game's accessibility, the networked multiplayer, and the ability to blast through obstructive terrain, though he found some issues with the AI. A Next Generation critic commented that Z stands out from other real-time strategy games because of the absence of resource management, which puts the focus of the game on fast reaction time and raw strategy rather than on economics. He said Z lacks the longevity of its nearest competition, since it has relatively few missions and the two sides use the same units, but is "a very good, original game that's enjoyable in its own right" with its AI, interface, and multiplayer mode all being strong assets. PC Zone magazine described Z as "a brilliant strategy game that is so hard you can't help but get value for money from it ... Like all Bitmap Bros' games, there are loads of little touches that will amuse you, from the incompetent piss-head droids in the cut-scenes, flying you from level to level and crashing on the people flagging them in, to the voice which says, when you're struggling, 'You are so crap'." Computer Gaming World gave it a 3.5/5, and called it an "excellent quick-'n'-dirty version of Command & Conquer, stripped down for speed and playability." They said that "if you don't mind a game that's on the short side, and you are a real-time tactical game lover with a good sense of humor, then buckle into your computer chair, dude, and crack open a cold can of Rocket Fuel, because Z is going to be your favorite letter."

Reviewing the Saturn port, Sega Saturn Magazine's Lee Nutter gave the AI for both friendly and enemy troops the highest of praise, and also commented on the addictiveness of the gameplay and the effectiveness of the point-and-click controls. However, he rated it the weakest of the three war simulators available for the Saturn in Europe, citing its short length, lack of multiplayer, and comparatively shallow gameplay.

According to Sega Saturn Magazine, "The PC version was a hit (despite being released on the same day as Quake)".

The re-release by Tick Tock Games received a negative review from Softpedia, which criticized the lack of modern enhancements, arguing that both the gameplay and graphics of Z had aged badly.

== Legacy ==
During a period of no official support, the game was 'kept alive' with the help of an unofficial fan website called ZZone. The fan community created fan fixes for Z95 support past Windows 95. It also data mined for the original graphic and sound assets from the game.

=== The Zod Engine (Remake) ===
The Zod Engine is an actively developed open source remake of the game. Its main focus is to provide a cross platform friendly source base which is multiplayer oriented. Considering that the original is easily available the developers of the Zod Engine decided not to focus their efforts on the single player aspect but instead to make single player merely an option of multiplayer. The Zod Engine currently entails almost all of the original features and gameplay of the original game and is in a Beta stage. It is derived out of the efforts of the hackers at the ZZone website and is available at SourceForge.

The Zod Engine was the subject of an article in the June 2011 issue of Linux Format.

=== OpenZ ===
OpenZ is an unofficial fan-made remake of Z in 3D, developed in Unity and released free of charge in October 2026 for Windows, with experimental versions for macOS and Linux. It keeps the original's focus on capturing territory and factories rather than base building, and adds 3D maps with dynamic lighting, weather, a day and night cycle and destructible buildings and bridges. Version 1.2 added a playable blue faction and a medium tank. The remake does not require the original game's files.
