= Xenon (video game) =

1988 video game

- Cover artwork by Paul Kidby
- Developer: The Bitmap Brothers
- Publisher: Melbourne House
- Platforms: Amiga, Amstrad CPC, Arcade, Atari ST, Commodore 64, MS-DOS, MSX, ZX Spectrum
- Release: 1988
- Genre: Scrolling shooter
- Mode: Single-player

Xenon is a vertically scrolling shooter the first developed by The Bitmap Brothers. It was originally written for the Atari ST and published by Melbourne House in 1988, then ported to the Amiga, Commodore 64, MS-DOS, MSX, and ZX Spectrum. It was featured as a play-by-phone game on the Saturday-morning kids' show Get Fresh.

Xenon was followed in 1989 by Xenon 2: Megablast.

== Plot ==
Atari ST screenshot

According to the game's instruction manual, the player assumes the role of Darrian, a future space pilot in the Federation, currently at war with a mysterious and violent alien species called the Xenites that has lasted a decade. In response to a mayday transmission from Captain Xod following an attack on his trading fleet, Darrian is forced to travel through Xenite-occupied territory in order to support.

Unlike most vertically scrolling shooters, the player craft has two modes, a flying plane and a ground tank. The transition between crafts can be initiated at almost any time during play (except during the mid- and end-of-level boss sections, as well as certain levels where a certain mode is forced), and the mode chosen depends on the nature of the threat the player faces. Destroying some enemies released power-ups the player could catch to enhance their ship.

== Ports ==
Originally released for the Atari ST, Xenon was ported to the Amiga, Amstrad CPC, Commodore 64, MS-DOS, MSX and ZX Spectrum. An arcade machine version of the game was also released through Mastertronic's Arcadia division which ran on Amiga hardware.

== Reception ==
Reception

Review scores
Publication	Score
Crash	84%
Computer and Video Games	9/10
Your Sinclair	9/10
ACE	869/1000
Atari ST User	10/10
Power Play	4.5/10

Awards
Publication	Award
Sinclair User	SU Classic
Your Sinclair	Megagame

Xenon was almost universally well-received on launch, with reviewers from magazines covering a range of platforms all scoring the game very highly. Only German magazine Power Play bucked the trend, awarding it a score of 4.5 out of 10.

Writing in New Computer Express about the 1991 budget re-release, Stuart Campbell stated that although the graphics were "gorgeous" and had "never really been seen before", the gameplay was "simply tedious" and the game was the first to "turn 'style-over-content' into an artform".
