= Spiritual successor =

Follow-up work that does not continue the canon of its predecessor

A spiritual successor (sometimes called a spiritual sequel) is a product or fictional work that is similar to, or inspired by, another previous product or work, but (unlike a traditional prequel or sequel) does not explicitly continue the product line or media franchise of its predecessor, and is thus only a successor "in spirit", despite the usual lack of actual spirituality. Spiritual successors often have similar themes and styles to their preceding material, but are generally a distinct intellectual property.

In fiction, the term generally refers to a work by a creator that shares similarities to one of their earlier works, but is set in a different continuity, and features distinct characters and settings. Such works may arise when licensing issues prevent a creator from releasing a sequel using the same copyrighted characters and names as the original.

== In literature ==
Arthur Conan Doyle's Sherlock Holmes stories, published between 1887 and 1927, drew a large number of pastiches from other authors as early as the 1900s to capture the same mystery and spirit as Doyle's writings. Subsequently, Doyle and his publishers, and since then Doyle's estate, had aggressively enforced copyright on the Holmes character, often requiring authors that were publishing stories to change any use of Holmes' name to something else. The name "Herlock Sholmes" became one of the more common variations on this, such as in Maurice Leblanc's Arsène Lupin versus Herlock Sholmes, with the Sholmes character having a personality similar, but not quite exactly like Holmes to further distance potential copyright issues.

The character Solar Pons, a pastiche of Holmes, appeared in several books not authorized by the estate of Conan Doyle beginning in 1945. These copyright issues have continued into contemporary times: in the case Klinger v. Conan Doyle Estate, Ltd. (2014), it was determined that the characters of Holmes and Watson were in the public domain. However, certain story elements were under copyright until 2023.

== In films and television ==
In films and television shows, spiritual successor often describes similar works by the same creator or starring the same cast. For example, the show Parks and Recreation is a spiritual successor to The Office. Both are workplace mockumentaries developed by Greg Daniels, featuring satirical humor and characters being filmed by an in-universe documentary film crew. The Office would later get a follow-up to and spinoff named The Paper, also developed by Greg Daniels.

The film 10 Cloverfield Lane was not originally scripted with any connection to Cloverfield. When the film was acquired by Bad Robot, producer J. J. Abrams recognized a common element of a giant monster attack between the two films, and chose to turn 10 Cloverfield Lane into a sequel and market it as a spiritual successor to Cloverfield to help bring interest to the newer film, which allowed him to establish a franchise he could build upon in the future. Spiritual successors are common in Indian film industries, particularly Bollywood, where films marketed as sequels do not share continuity with their predecessors.

== In video games ==
=== Games by the same studio ===
Spiritual successor games are sometimes made by the same studio as the original, but with a new title due to licensing issues. Some examples of these include:

- The Dark Souls series by FromSoftware was inspired by the studio's earlier game, Demon's Souls, an exclusive title for the PlayStation 3. Because Sony Interactive Entertainment held the rights to Demon's Souls, the studio was unable to produce a sequel on other platforms, leading them to create a new property with similar gameplay mechanics. Demon's Souls itself was a spiritual successor to King's Field.
- Irrational Games' BioShock is a spiritual successor to their earlier System Shock 2. While System Shock 2 was met with critical acclaim, it was considered a commercial failure, and publisher Electronic Arts would not allow a third title in the series. After several years and other projects at Irrational, as well as being acquired by a new publisher 2K Games, the studio developed BioShock, with a similar free-form narrative structure.
- Shadow of the Colossus was considered a spiritual successor to Ico by Fumito Ueda, who directed both games as leader of Team Ico. Ueda expressed that he did not necessarily want a canonical connection between the games, but that both had similar narrative themes and elements that he wanted players to interpret on their own.
- Created by Facepunch Studios, S&box (stylized as s&box) is a spiritual successor to Garry's Mod. Unlike the latter being a sandbox mod of the Source engine, s&box is a game engine and platform built on top of Source 2.

=== Games by the same staff ===
Alternatively, a successor may be developed by some of the staff who worked on the preceding game, under a new studio name. Examples of these include:

- Yooka-Laylee is a spiritual successor evoking the style and gameplay of Rare's Banjo-Kazooie. It was developed by Playtonic Games, which consisted of many former Rare staff members, including programmer Chris Sutherland and composer Grant Kirkhope. Yooka and Laylee, the game's animal protagonists, serve as stand-ins for the original game's Banjo and Kazooie.
- Mighty No. 9 closely resembles the gameplay and character design of the Mega Man series, which project lead Keiji Inafune worked on before leaving Capcom, and is considered a spiritual successor.
- Bloodstained: Ritual of the Night is considered a spiritual successor to the Castlevania series, created by Koji Igarashi who had led development of several Castlevania games before leaving Konami.
- A number of games from Bullfrog Productions have spawned spiritual successors in the years after the studio was closed by Electronic Arts in 2001, with these projects typically led by former staff from Bullfrog having found their own studios. These include Godus by Peter Molyneux's studio 22cans, succeeding Populous; 5 Lives Studios' Satellite Reign, succeeding Syndicate Wars; and Two Point Hospital by Mark Webley and Gary Carr's Two Point Studios, succeeding Theme Hospital.
- P.N.03 has been called the spiritual predecessor of Bayonetta for its "combat...with stylish dance-inspired movements" and "flashy, energetic, intense" gameplay and character design. P.N.03 director Shinji Mikami later co-founded PlatinumGames, the studio that developed Bayonetta, and Bayonetta director and PlatinumGames co-founder Hideki Kamiya also directed Resident Evil 2, Devil May Cry, and Viewtiful Joe, the last of which was part of the Capcom Five with P.N.03.
- The upcoming game Physint, set to be directed by Hideo Kojima, has been envisioned as the spiritual successor to the Metal Gear series (published by Konami and directed and produced by Kojima until his departure from the studio in 2015) as a return to the 'tactical-espionage' genre.
- In December 2025, Lucasfilm Games announced Star Wars: Fate of the Old Republic, an action role-playing game described as a spiritual successor to the 2003 role-playing game Star Wars: Knights of the Old Republic, and helmed by Casey Hudson, who directed the aforementioned game as well as the original Mass Effect trilogy during his time at BioWare.

=== Common themes only ===
The term is also more broadly applied to video games developed by a different studio with no connection to the original, and simply inspired by the gameplay, aesthetics or other elements of the preceding work. Examples of such games include:

- The game Cities: Skylines (along with other city-builder games) is considered a spiritual successor to the SimCity series, both focusing on constructing and managing a simulated city.
- Axiom Verge is a side-scrolling Metroidvania game that succeeds the Metroid series.
- The Mother series (known as EarthBound outside Japan) has inspired a number of pixel-art, role-playing indie games featuring children in playable character roles as spiritual successors to the series. A notable example is Undertale. A parody of Mother, Citizens of Earth, is also considered a spiritual successor in gameplay and story only.
- War for the Overworld (succeeding Dungeon Keeper) crossed through several of these categories over the course of the development. Originating as a fan-made sequel to Dungeon Keeper 2, the game then became a spiritual successor with only thematic connection after moving away from the Dungeon Keeper IP. Finally, the hiring of returning voice actor Richard Ridings presented a staff connection to the original.

== In sports ==
In sports, the Ravens–Steelers rivalry is considered the spiritual successor to the older Browns–Steelers rivalry due to the original Cleveland Browns relocation to Baltimore, as well as the reactivated Browns having a 6–30 record against the Steelers since returning to the league in 1999. However, the latter rivalry began to heat up on the Pittsburgh side when the Browns defeated the Steelers 48–37 in the 2020 Wild Card playoff round.

== In other industries ==
The Honda CR-Z is regarded as the spiritual successor to the second generation Honda CR-X in both name and exterior design, despite a nearly two decade time difference in production. The Toyota Fortuner SUV is a spiritual successor to the Toyota 4Runner SUV mainly because they both share the same platform as the Hilux pickup truck. The Canon Cat computer was Jef Raskin's spiritual successor to the Apple Macintosh.

Bluesky is seen by some as the spiritual successor to Twitter, due to it originally being a research initiative at Twitter, Inc., becoming an independent company in 2021. After Elon Musk's acquisition of Twitter, its rebranding into X, and subsequent severing of ties between the companies, many Twitter users migrated to Bluesky.

== See also ==
- Canon (fiction)
- Continuation novel
- Phoenix club (sports)
- Reboot (fiction)
- Remake
- Revisionism (fictional)
- Sequel
- Spin-off (media)
  - Gaiden
- Digression
