= World War II: Frontline Command =

2003 video game

- Developer: Bitmap Brothers
- Publishers: EU: Koch Media; NA: Strategy First
- Platform: Windows
- Release: PAL: May 2, 2003; NA: June 26, 2003
- Genre: Strategy
- Modes: Single-player, multiplayer

World War II Frontline Command is a real-time strategy, 3D, tactical war game for Windows that was developed by long standing developers, the Bitmap Brothers. It was originally released in Europe during May 2003 by Koch Media and a month later in June by Strategy First.

== Plot ==
The game is set within the era of World War II. The game opens with the player dropping paratroopers into Europe to disrupt the entrenched Axis forces ahead of the main invasion forces set to land on D-Day.

== Gameplay ==
Players must take command of their forces and turn the tide of Axis aggression while conquering fortress Europe, using a vast amount of authentic infantry, vehicles and weaponry. Mission objectives include destroying bridges, clearing bunkers, and knocking down radar towers. There are no resources to be collected or buildings to be constructed.

World War II Frontline Command features two play modes, recruit and veteran, that share some of the same mission maps. Enemy units are attracted to noise so using gunfire may attract unwanted attention. A morale system has been incorporated meaning that after losses are sustained, performance will be adversely affected.

== Development ==
Gaming Director, Jamie Barber noted that the game engine used in the creation of Z: Steel Soldiers was upgraded in the development of Frontline Command.

== Reception ==
Reception

Review scores
Publication	Score
Eurogamer	9 out of 10
GameSpot	6.2 out of 10
IGN	7 out of 10

The game acquired a generally positive reception by reviewers. A Eurogamer reviewer felt the game was realistic, had detailed graphics and a very good interface that allowed complex actions.

An IGN Entertainment review felt the sounds were nothing remarkable and both the cut scenes and tutorial mode were un-original and standard. Another review at GameSpot, felt the ideas behind the game were good, but the implementation was flawed.

== See also ==
- List of strategy video games
- List of World War II video games
