= The Chaos Engine =

1993 video game

- Clockwise from top left: Navvie, Thug, Mercenary, Preacher, Gentleman, Brigand
- Developer: The Bitmap Brothers
- Publisher: Renegade Software
- Designers: Simon Knight; Eric Matthews
- Programmers: Stephen Cargill; Mike Montgomery
- Artist: Dan Malone
- Composers: Richard Joseph; Farook Joi; Haroon Joi
- Platforms: Amiga, Atari ST, Amiga CD32, MS-DOS, RISC OS, Mega Drive, Super NES, Mobile phone, Windows, OS X, Linux
- Release: March 16, 1993
- Genre: Run and gun
- Modes: Single-player, multiplayer

The Chaos Engine is a top-down run and gun video game developed by The Bitmap Brothers and published by Renegade Software in March 1993. The game is set in a steampunk Victorian age in which one or two players must battle the hostile creations of the eponymous Chaos Engine across four landscapes and ultimately defeat it and its deranged inventor.

It was first released for the Amiga, with a version available for AGA Amigas, and later ported to MS-DOS, the Super Nintendo Entertainment System, Atari ST, Amiga CD32, RISC OS and Mega Drive. In the Super NES and Mega Drive versions, the Preacher character was renamed as the Scientist and redesigned to remove his clerical collar. The US versions of these two ports were retitled Soldiers of Fortune. A sequel to the game, The Chaos Engine 2, was released in 1996.

== Plot ==
The setting is a steampunk Victorian era England. A time traveller on a reconnaissance mission from the distant future became stranded in the England of the late 1800s, and his technology came into the hands of the Royal Society, led by Baron Fortesque (based upon Charles Babbage), a grand inventor. Fortesque then retro engineered many of the futuristic contraptions, creating an entirely different, alternate timeline.

Baron Fortesque then succeeded in his greatest creation yet: the Chaos Engine, which was able to experiment with matter and the very nature of space and time. Unfortunately for the rest of the proud kingdom, the Engine then proceeded to become sentient, captured and assimilated its creator, and began to change the countryside for the worse. Vile monsters and destructive automata appeared everywhere, and even prehistoric beasts were resurrected. Telegram wires connecting the British Isles to the European mainland are cut, and any ship attempting to enter a British port is attacked. The British Royal Family, members of Parliament and a large number of refugees manage to escape across the sea, bringing with them many tales of horror. The British Empire is left in tatters, and the world in economic and political chaos. That lures a number of mercenaries on a potentially-rewarding quest to infiltrate the quarantined Britain, find the root of the problem, and swiftly bring a full stop to it.

At the end of the cellars in the hall of machines, the player characters face the Chaos Engine itself in a last battle. Upon its destruction, the narrator of the game is revealed to be the baron himself, trapped within the machine and studded with implants.

The introductory sequence is displayed in text on the screen on the floppy disk Amiga versions, but a slightly modified version is narrated with a voiceover on the Amiga CD32 version, together with some scene-setting animations.

== Characters ==
Players choose two adventurers from a group of six to take on the task of defeating the mad Baron Fortesque and the Chaos Engine itself. The playable characters have various qualities that affect gameplay, such as speed and combat ability. The players are provided with a certain amount of money to start the game and must hire the chosen characters at their set prices.

In one-player mode, the computer artificial intelligence controls the second player, so that one never has to fight the chaos alone. Control of characters cannot be swapped once chosen. It is possible to play with only one character, by starting a two-player game and letting the enemies kill the second character.

=== Navvie and Thug ===
The Navvie and Thug are the strongest and most expensive of the group. They have the highest health and most destructive specials but are slower than the other characters. The Navvie uses a bazooka, which fires straight ahead and does heavy damage; the Thug uses a shotgun, which is less powerful than the bazooka but fires many shots in a wide angle.

=== Brigand and Mercenary ===
The Brigand and Mercenary are the all-rounded characters and have a mid-range price. Though they are slightly weaker than the Navvie and Thug, they have access to more specials and can move faster. The Brigand uses a rifle, which works the same as the Navvie's bazooka but is not as powerful. The Mercenary uses a Gatling gun that operates similarly to the Thug's shotgun, but with a different pattern.

=== Gentleman and Preacher/Scientist ===
The Gentleman and Preacher are the least expensive, with the highest movement speed and widest selection of specials; however, they have the lowest health. The Gentleman uses a flame pistol, while the Preacher carries a lightning gun. Their shots are weaker than those of the other characters, but they can pass through enemies after hitting them.

For the North American release, the Preacher character was redesigned slightly and renamed as the Scientist because the game's North American publishers felt that a priest killing people was offensive.

== Gameplay ==
World 1

The players must travel through four worlds consisting of four levels each, picking up power-ups, gold and keys to pass through the various puzzles and mazes. A number of "nodes" must be activated via weapon fire (or special power) to open the final doors at the end of each level. At the end of every second level, the players has a chance to spend their collected riches to upgrade their weapons, increase the number of hit points of their character, purchase new items and improve other character attributes.

== Development ==
Developers included Steve Cargill, Simon Knight, Dan Malone, Eric Mathews and Mike Montgomery. Joi composed the title theme and Richard Joseph composed all other in-game music.

The game was inspired by William Gibson and Bruce Sterling's novel, The Difference Engine, and its basic plot and stylistics are both based on the novel.

The game's coder developed the partner AI by observing play-testing of the game, then coding the AI according to his observations of the player's behaviors.

The game was later ported to consoles. In order to fit the soundtrack into the Super NES's audio memory, which is much smaller than the Amiga's, Joseph both used standard compression methods and put all the note data and drivers in the console's main memory, reserving the audio memory for samples.

== Reception ==
Reception

Review scores
Publication	Score
Computer Game Review	78/84/83
Electronic Gaming Monthly	6.8/10 (SNES); 6.4/10(Genesis)
GamesMaster	90%

Awards
Publication	Award
Sega	1993 Game of the Year
SEGA Awards	1994 Best Action Game
SEGA Awards	1994 Best 3rd Party Game of the Year
Amiga Power	11th best game of all time
Mega	15th best Mega Drive game of all time

Electronic Gaming Monthly gave the Super NES version a 6.8 out of 10, summarizing it as "A decent overhead shooting game in the spirit of Technoclash and Gauntlet." They gave the Genesis version a 6.4. GamePro remarked of the Genesis version that "Overhead-view gunfighting has never played better", citing the heavy challenge, solid controls, and use of teamwork. They criticized the sprites as overly small, but also noted that the sharp artwork ensures that it is still easy to make out what is happening on screen.

Reviewing the computer version, Computer Game Review's Tasos Kaiafas wrote, "For the price, this a must-buy if you like two-player arcade shooters, especially since another one for the PC may not come along for awhile." In 1995, Total! ranked The Chaos Engine 68th on their Top 100 SNES Games summarizing: "Sort of Jules Vern meets Arnie. This is a great cooperative challenge and very stylish with it."

== Remake ==
A remastered version of the game of The Chaos Engine, essentially a widescreen port of the Amiga AGA version (named AA version in the title screen) with the original intro and music intact, was developed by Abstraction Games and released for Windows, Mac and Linux on August 29, 2013. The game retains all gameplay features, the audio and the graphics of the original.

The remastered version adds the option to play a remote two-player game through Steam. There is also a global high score list, and two optional graphics effects: a softening filter to alleviate the low-resolution pixelated graphics and a bloom effect on selected parts of the game graphics.
