= Xenon 2: Megablast =

1989 shoot 'em up video game

- Amiga version cover art
- Developer: The Bitmap Brothers
- Publishers: Image Works: Virgin Games (MS, MD); Epic/Sony (PC-98, X68000); Mindscape (GB); GamesWare (AA); AtariAge (JAG)
- Designer: The Bitmap Brothers
- Programmers: The Assembly Line: Sean Cross (MS); S. Green (MS); Delvin Sorrell (MD, CDTV)
- Artist: Mark Coleman
- Composers: Bomb the Bass; David Whittaker
- Series: Xenon
- Platforms: Amiga; Atari ST; Master System; PC-98; X68000; Mega Drive; Game Boy; CDTV; Acorn Archimedes; Atari Jaguar
- Release: September 1989: Amiga, Atari ST; September 1989; Master System; November 21, 1991; PC-98; November 22, 1991; X68000; November 30, 1991; Game Boy, CDTV; October 1992; Mega Drive; November 12, 1992; Acorn Archimedes; October 1993; Atari Jaguar; May 27, 2016
- Genre: Shoot 'em up
- Modes: Single-player, multiplayer

Xenon 2: Megablast is a 1989 shoot 'em up video game developed by The Bitmap Brothers and published by Image Works for the Amiga and Atari ST. It was later converted to the Master System, PC-98, X68000, Mega Drive, Commodore CDTV, Game Boy, Acorn Archimedes and Atari Jaguar platforms. The game is a sequel to Xenon and takes place a millennium after the previous title. The goal of the game is to destroy a series of bombs planted throughout history by the Xenites, the vengeful antagonists of the first game.

Xenon 2: Megablast is the third major video game release by The Bitmap Brothers. Its subtitle is derived from the Bomb the Bass track "Megablast (Hip Hop on Precinct 13)", which serves as the game's theme music. The original release of Xenon 2: Megablast was met with critical acclaim and commercial success, with reviewers praising the detailed visuals, addictive gameplay, variety of weapons and innovative soundtrack.

== Gameplay ==
An example of gameplay in the Atari ST version of Xenon 2: Megablast.

Xenon 2: Megablast is a vertically scrolling shoot 'em up in which the player takes on the role of a starship pilot who must destroy five bombs planted throughout history by the villainous Xenites. The player controls the Megablaster, a small battlecraft that can move in multiple directions, is equipped with a blaster as an offensive measure, and is shielded from enemy attacks and collisions for a temporary period. The game is split into five scrolling levels ranging in theme from the Cambrian era to futuristic metallic spaceways. The levels are primarily inhabited by aggressive lifeforms that have been mutated by radiation emanating from the bombs planted at the end of each level.

Attacks from these enemy characters will decrease the player's shield. If the shield is completely depleted, the ship will be destroyed by the next hit it sustains, and the player will lose a life. Each level contains six "restart positions", from which the ship will respawn at the most recent position passed if a life is lost. If all three lives are lost, the game will end. The shield can also sustain damage if the ship is trapped by the scenery and is crushed as the screen continues to scroll. The player can reverse the direction of the scrolling to a limited extent by pulling back on their directional input when the ship is at the bottom of the screen. A boss character is found at the end of each level and requires a specific strategy to destroy. When the boss is defeated, the bomb within the level will be defused. The first level only features one boss character, while the other four feature another boss at the level's halfway point.

Capsules can occasionally be found within the levels, and release one of a variety of collectible tokens when destroyed. These tokens can augment the ship's weaponry or speed, restore a portion of the ship's shield, or allow the ship to dive into the background for a limited time. Destroyed enemies leave behind currency known as Real Cash, the quantity and value of which depending on the size of the enemy. Real Cash can be used to buy and sell tokens at "Crispin's Swop Shop", which the player can access twice per level. Xenon 2: Megablast is primarily single-player, but allows for two players to play intermittently.

== Development and release ==
Xenon 2: Megablast was conceptualized and designed by The Bitmap Brothers (consisting of Mike Montgomery, Steve Kelly and Eric Matthews) and published by Image Works. It is the third major release by The Bitmap Brothers after Xenon and Speedball. Matthews reckoned that "everyone seems to be into destruction and extra weapons in a big way", and sought to satisfy this demand with Xenon 2: Megablast. The development team drew inspiration from Scramble, Gradius and R-Type, and attempted to deviate from the shoot 'em up formula by making the enemy characters less predictable and predetermined. The Megablaster's ability from the previous title to transform into a tank was omitted to make the gameplay more straightforward.

The title's namesake, "Megablast (Hip Hop on Precinct 13)" by Bomb the Bass, was arranged by David Whittaker and incorporated as the game's primary musical theme.

The game was programmed by The Assembly Line, who wrote the code on an IBM Personal Computer and then ported to an Atari ST. The graphics were created by Mark Coleman, who designed the visuals based on Matthews's brief descriptions using both DEGAS Elite and additional animation routines written by Montgomery. The audio was created by David Whittaker, who arranged the Bomb the Bass track "Megablast (Hip Hop on Precinct 13)" as the game's background score. The game's subtitle is derived from this track. The arrangement heard in the title screen includes the samples from the original version, while the arrangement heard during gameplay is slightly stripped down. The development team had been eager to include the track in a shoot 'em up game, with Matthews saying "It's perfect music for a shoot 'em up. It's instrumental, which makes it relatively easy to reproduce on computer, and the title says it all." Rhythm King founder Martin Heath and Bomb the Bass headman Tim Simenon were both avid fans of computer games, and their favourable response resulted in "Megablast" being licensed for the game.

An early version of Xenon 2: Megablast was demonstrated on the Channel 4 programme Signals in mid-January 1989, and the game was formally announced in April. After an additional showing at a promotions event by Mirrorsoft in Amsterdam, Xenon 2: Megablast was released in September 1989. On that month, a promotional sweepstake was run by Computer and Video Games and Mirrorsoft in which contestants who filled and mailed a postcard were eligible to win the grand prize of a Discman and a copy of the Bomb the Bass album Into the Dragon, from which the game's titular track originates. Ten second-prize winners received a copy of the game and a special limited-edition Xenon 2: Megablast t-shirt.

The Master System version of the game was programmed by Sean Cross and S. Green, was released on November 21, 1991 and has a reduced level count from five to three. In the same month as the Master System version, Epic/Sony Records also published versions for PC-98 and X68000 in Japan. The Game Boy version was published by Mindscape and released in October 1992. A version for the Commodore CDTV, programmed by Delvin Sorrell, was released in the same month, and includes a high fidelity remix of "Megablast" as well as voice acting for the character Crispin provided by Richard Joseph. A version for the SNES was announced the following month, but not released. The Sega Mega Drive version was also programmed by Sorrell and released on November 12, 1992. The Master System and Mega Drive versions were published by Virgin Games. A version for the Acorn Archimedes and other Acorn 32-bit machines was released in late 1993, published by GamesWare. On May 27, 2016, a version for the Atari Jaguar, created by AtariAge user Cyrano Jones, was released with Mike Montgomery's blessing. The Atari Jaguar version includes a new soundtrack composed by 505.

== Reception ==
=== Amiga and Atari ST ===
Reception (Amiga and Atari ST)

Review scores
Publication	Score
ACE	AMI: 91% AST: 90.5%
Computer and Video Games	AMI: 96% AST: 94%
Zzap!64	AMI: 97%
Amiga User International	AMI: 9/10
Atari ST User	AST: 10/10
Commodore User	AMI: 88%
ST Format	AST: 90%
The Games Machine	AMI: 96% AST: 95%
The One	AST: 93%
Zero	AMI: 94% AST: 93%

The Amiga and Atari ST versions of Xenon 2: Megablast were met with critical acclaim. Roland Waddilove of Atari ST User gave the game a perfect score and declared it to be one of the year's best vertically-scrolling shoot 'em ups, but stated that while the gameplay is "fast and addictive", it lacked originality in the face of a saturated shoot 'em up market. Stuart Wynne of Zzap!64 lauded the game's difficulty, and said that while the gameplay was standard for its genre, the wide range of power-ups to enhance the ship with served as a vital difference. Warren Lapworth of The Games Machine deemed the game "a superlative shoot-'em-up" and "a classing sounding, looking, and playing blaster, wholly deserving of the prefix 'Mega'". He commended the shop feature as "brilliantly presented and cleverly thought-out" and the ability to reverse course as a "great idea ... [that] helps transform an already highly playable shoot-'em-up into a classic, addictive one". Paul Glancey of Computer and Video Games praised the gameplay, graphics and sound and called the game "utterly superb". Duncan MacDonald of Zero declared that the game "is (to date) the DEFINITIVE vertical scrolling shoot 'em up", while David McCandless of the same publication said that the game "has the best music, graphics, gameplay and doner kebabs this side of Crewe". MacDonald noted that the "add-on weapons" system was "awesome", and both he and McCandless felt that the "restart position" system kept the learning curve and difficulty at a reasonable level.

Brian Nesbitt of The One commended the game's variety of weapons, and felt that the game "will undoubtedly have the same effect on the games scene as its predecessor did over a year ago". Pete Connor of ACE decided that the game "is one of the most accomplished shoot-em-ups you're likely to come across this side of Christmas", and that the challenge provided by the amount of detail and action balanced out the low amount of levels. Gary Barrett of ST Format called the game "extremely addictive and exciting" in spite of its lack of new concepts, and considered it to be "in the same elite class as Blood Money". Tony Horgan of Amiga User International was grateful for the feature of retaining weapons after losing a life, which he felt made the game's balance "perfect". Mike Pattenden of Commodore User observed that "Xenon II pursues the relentless quest for an arcade quality shoot'em up on the Amiga, and it's probably the closest yet." However, he felt that the slow scroll rate induced an element of tedium, and that the lack of variation held back the strength of the game's challenge. The loading times between levels and the Swop Shop were criticized.

Waddilove highlighted the detailed sprites and parallax scrolling backgrounds. Wynne described the game's visual themes as "imaginative and unique", and proclaimed that the "well nigh perfect" animation "sets a new standard in presentation". Lapworth described the game as "a truly awesome sight" and praised the sprites as "imaginative and conception and brilliant in execution", the enemy designs as "pleasingly vicious" and the colours and textures as "realistic and highly impressive". MacDonald considered the artwork and animation to be "as good as anyone could ask for"; he pointed out the abundant colours, the depth granted to the backgrounds by the parallax scrolling, and the "sheer genius" design and animation of the enemy sprites. McCandless also spoke highly of the visuals; he proclaimed the game to have "simply the best graphics this side of the arcade", felt that the enemy designs were "realistic and seriously hateable", and expressed surprise at the amount of animated details such as the weapons and items. Connor called the game "one of the prettiest you're likely to see on the ST this year", and described the graphics as "colourful, smooth and fast". Barrett said that the game's "superior" graphics boosted the presentation of the enemy and weapon sprites. Pattenden praised the graphics as "superb" and "definitely arcade quality", and singled out the backgrounds and colour schemes as "brilliant".

Waddilove commended the soundtrack as "very professionally performed", and observed that the game's explosions and zaps make the game "noisy but fun". Wynne of Zzap!64 deemed the arrangement of "Megablast" "impressive", while Robin Hogg of the same publication was unenthusiastic for the choice of in-game music and voiced a preference for heavy metal. Lapworth considered Whittaker's re-sequenced version of "Megablast" to be "an excellent soundtrack", but expressed disappointment at the arrangement of the Atari ST version, which consisted of "very ordinary in-game spot effects". McCandless declared the soundtrack to be "nothing short of awesome", and said that "the entire game is worth buying just for the intro". Nesbitt said that "from the moment the incredible David Whittaker reconstruction of Bomb the Bass' Megablast bursts into life, you know you are in for something special." Connor called the soundtrack "superb" and remarked that "you can hear every last scratch, yelp, and shriek as the sound chip works overtime." Horgan commended the game's theme as "brilliant". Pattenden felt that the game's mix of "Megablast" was "every bit as potent as the original cut".

The Amiga and Atari ST versions topped the Gallup sales charts for their respective consoles in their debut month, and stayed within the Top 20 charts for the next three months. ST Format included the game in its "50 Games of the Year", saying that "Flawless graphics, nightmarish wriggly sprites, and instantaneous addiction made it the gamester's rave of the year." In a subsequent issue, ST Format ranked the game at #30 in its "30 Kick-Ass Classics" and declared it to be the definitive vertical-scrolling shoot-'em-up, but simultaneously identified it as the genre's "death", remarking that "the Bitmaps milked what credibility remained" and that "nothing else could follow it". ST Format later ranked the game as the #1 shoot-'em-up in its "Top 50 Games of 1990", and observed that it was "for many the high point of shoot-'em-ups; for others, the one that killed 'em". The game was ranked the 33rd best Amiga game of all time by Amiga Power.

=== Other versions ===
Reception (other versions)

Review scores
Publication	Score
Nintendo Power	GB: 11.7/20
Amiga Format	CDTV: 32%
Mean Machines	MS: 84% MD: 82%

The Sega versions were assessed positively by Mean Machines. Julian Rignall and Richard Leadbetter both praised the Master System version's graphics as some of the best on the console, and considered the gameplay to be as addictive as its 16-bit counterparts due to the variety of weapons, though Leadbetter felt that the pace of the gameplay was slow and that the sound effects were lacking. Rignall and Leadbetter also complimented the visuals of the Mega Drive version, but were disappointed by the jerky scrolling and poor musical arrangement. Damien Noonan of Amiga Format rated the Commodore CDTV version a paltry 32%, commenting that, while innovative at the time it was first released, the game had aged poorly and its gameplay was not well-balanced. In a middling review of the Game Boy version, Nintendo Power spoke positively of the mechanic of buying weapons to upgrade the ship and the challenge provided by the enemies approaching from all sides, but criticized the slow speed of the ship and the absence of continuous firing.
