= The Chaos Engine 2 =

1996 video game

- Standing back to back: Navvie (left) and Mercenary. Corners, clockwise from top left: Gentleman, Brigand, Mercenary, Navvie.
- Developer: The Bitmap Brothers
- Publisher: Renegade Software
- Platforms: Amiga, Amiga CD32
- Release: UK: 1996
- Genre: Run and gun
- Modes: Single-player, multiplayer

The Chaos Engine 2 is a top-down shooter video game, and sequel to The Chaos Engine, released for the Amiga in 1996 and developed by The Bitmap Brothers. A Sega Mega Drive version was planned but never released.

== Plot ==
During the original game, the protagonists succeed in destroying the Chaos Engine, a time-travel device. Its creator, Baron Fortesque, appears to have been defeated. However, in The Chaos Engine 2, it transpires that he and the protagonists are all trapped within a temporal singularity created by the destruction of the Chaos Engine device. In order to survive they must assist the Baron in rebuilding the device, though only one of them will be able to escape the singularity.

== Gameplay ==
Unlike its predecessor, The Chaos Engine 2 is a split-screen deathmatch between two players, one of which may be controlled by the computer: there is no co-operative mode available. Instead, each player must try to obtain the greatest score, either by simply killing the opponent repeatedly or by collecting objects, destroying monsters, fulfilling tasks and solving puzzles. Conversely, points are lost if killed. Inventories are dropped upon death, which means that if a quest requires a key to unlock a door or a safe, it becomes necessary to kill the opponent should they acquire it before the player. If a human opponent has the highest score at the end of a round, they move on to the next; if the computer defeats the player, the round is replayed until the user wins. A game can be played across 4, 8, 12 or 16 rounds, with each consisting of a different environment: Medieval, Aztec and Chaos.

=== Characters ===
The Chaos Engine 2 allows players to select one of four available characters. Each character has different attributes that define how quickly they move, how much health they begin with and their starting weapon. The four characters are:

- The Gentleman
- The Navvie
- The Brigand
- The Mercenary

=== Abilities ===
Initially, players are only able to obtain a limited selection of special abilities, but the range increases as they progress through each game:

- Teleportation: transports the opponent to a designated spot.
- Duplication: a free-moving clone of the player is created.
- Freeze: stuns the opponent and any monsters on the screen.
- Trap: allows a player to rig a door with explosives.
- Sunglasses: enables a player to become invisible.

== Reception ==
Reception

Review scores
| Publication | Score |
|---|---|
| Amiga Computing | 92% |
| CU Amiga | 90% |
| Amiga Format | 85% |

The Chaos Engine 2 was met with highly positive reviews. Amiga Computing commented that "the graphics are smooth and flowing, the action non-stop and there is a huge amount of playability." In a similar vein, CU Amiga praised it as a "totally brilliant single or multi-player game." Amiga Format criticized the difficulty of the single-player deathmatch against the computer, with the reviewer remarking that while it provided players with "plenty of challenge... the computer seemed to have way too much of an unfair advantage." Amiga Power and The One both previewed the game in 1995 and 1996 respectively, but neither magazine survived to see it published.
