= Magic Pockets =

1991 video game

- Developer: Bitmap Brothers
- Publisher: Renegade
- Platforms: Amiga, Atari ST, Archimedes, MS-DOS
- Release: October 1991
- Genre: Platform
- Mode: Single-player

Magic Pockets is a platform game developed by the Bitmap Brothers and published by Renegade in October 1991. It was released for the Atari ST, Amiga, Acorn Archimedes, and MS-DOS. The title track of the game is the instrumental version of "Doin' the Do", by Betty Boo, originally released in 1990 on the Rhythm King label.

== Plot ==
A boy, known as the Bitmap Kid, has a pair of magic trousers that contain pockets with an infinite amount of storage space, and therefore he stores all of his toys in his pockets. One day the creatures who live in his pockets decide to keep his toys for themselves and play with them, so the Bitmap Kid must go on a journey to retrieve his toys from the creatures.

== Gameplay ==
The game is a platform game allowing walking, jumping, and hurling items to defeat foes. There are four areas in the game; Cave, Jungle, River and Mountain areas, each of which is split into several stages including a bonus stage where the Bitmap Kid must outdo the creatures depending on what toy is to be retrieved - for example, the Bike is found in the Cave area, and so the bonus stage is a bike race against the creatures.

The Bitmap Kid has a different attack for every area of the game, all of which may be "charged up" by holding down the fire button to throw a bigger projectile. The largest projectile has the ability to "suck up" enemies rather than destroying them - they will then be converted into pickups. Pickups range from sweets, which add points, to Silver and Gold stars which introduce another aspect of gameplay: Helmets. By collecting silver stars, the Bitmap Kid can then collect a gold star, which will produce a helmet he can wear for a limited time. Helmets vary from teleporters, to laser beams, to invincibility. He may also 'float' by using chewing gum, collected from gum dispensers in the levels, to inflate a large bubble. Bubbles can sometimes help to reach secret areas.

There is no timer in the game. After taking too long a transparent bubble chases the Bitmap Kid, gradually growing faster and faster over time. If they come into contact, the bubble will trap the kid and he will lose all his power-ups, except at the last stage, where the bubble will kill him.

== Development and release ==
Magic Pockets was developed by The Bitmap Brothers and published by Renegade Software. Described as its first attempt at a "cutesy platform game", inspirations game came from Super Mario Bros., Rainbow Islands, and Flood. With Renegade Software being part of music company Rhythm King, a remix version of Doin' the Do by Betty Boo was used for the game's opening.

The game was played in-between cartoons on the Saturday morning television series Motormouth. Viewers would call in to play the game through commands they would give.

== Reception ==
Reception

Review scores
Publication	Score
Computer and Video Games	93/100
ACE	725/1000
The One	94%
Zero	90/100

Magic Pockets received generally positive reviews from video game critics.

== Legacy ==
A Game Boy Advance version of Magic Pockets was announced in 2002, but was never released.
