= Two Point Studios =

British video game developer

Two Point Studios Limited
- Type: Subsidiary
- Industry: Video games
- Founded: 26 July 2016; 10 years ago
- Founders: Ben Hymers; Mark Webley; Gary Carr
- Headquarters: Farnham, Surrey, England
- Number of employees: 40
- Parent: Sega (2019–present)
- Website: www.twopointstudios.com

Two Point Studios is a British video game developer based in Farnham. It was founded on 26 July 2016 by Ben Hymers, Mark Webley, and Gary Carr. Carr and Webley had previously worked on titles including Theme Hospital, Black & White, and the Fable series for Bullfrog Productions and later Lionhead Studios, with more alumni from the two companies and Mucky Foot Productions joining. In May 2019, the company was acquired by Sega and became part of Sega Europe.

== History ==
In May 2017, Two Point Studios announced it had signed a publishing partnership with Sega for a simulation game. The partnership is part of Sega's plan to locate and support talented developers and bring their expertise to the video gaming market. John Clark, Sega of Europe's senior vice president of commercial publishing, stated that Two Point Studios' vision is compatible with Sega's principles of franchise creation.

Two Point Studios revealed their first game as Two Point Hospital, a spiritual successor to Theme Hospital, in January 2018 for release later that year for Microsoft Windows. The developers intend for this to be first of several other simulation games, inspired by previous Bullfrog games. Others are also planned, and will share similarities and narrative elements with each other. Two Point Hospital was released to critically positive reception on 30 August 2018.

In June 2021, Two Point Studios announced Two Point Campus. The game was released in August 2022.

In August 2024, Two Point Studios announced Two Point Museum. The game was released in March 2025.

== Games developed ==
Year	Title	Platform(s)
2018	Two Point Hospital	Linux, macOS, Windows
2020	Two Point Hospital	Nintendo Switch, PlayStation 4, Xbox One
2022	Two Point Campus	Linux, macOS, Nintendo Switch, PlayStation 4, PlayStation 5, Windows, Xbox One, Xbox Series X/S
2025	Two Point Museum	Linux, macOS, PlayStation 5, Windows, Xbox Series X/S, Nintendo Switch 2
