= Two Point Hospital =

2018 simulation video game

- Developer: Two Point Studios (Note: Red Kite Games and Sega Hardlight developed the console versions.)
- Publisher: Sega
- Producer: Mark Webley
- Designers: Ben Huskins; Gary Carr
- Programmer: Ben Hymers
- Artist: Mark Smart
- Composers: Phil French; Tom Puttick; Jack Le Breton
- Engine: Unity
- Platforms: Linux; macOS; Windows; Nintendo Switch; PlayStation 4; Xbox One; Full Health Collection; Nintendo Switch 2; PlayStation 5; Xbox Series X/S
- Release: Linux, macOS, Windows; 30 August 2018; Switch, PS4, Xbox One; 25 February 2020; Amazon Luna; 19 November 2020; Full Health Collection; Switch 2, PS5, XBX/S; 16 September 2026
- Genre: Business simulation
- Modes: Single-player, multiplayer

Two Point Hospital is a 2018 business simulation game developed by Two Point Studios and published by Sega for Linux, macOS, and Windows. Console versions for the Nintendo Switch, PlayStation 4, and Xbox One were released in February 2020. A version for Amazon Luna was made available in November 2020. A spiritual successor to Bullfrog Productions' 1997 game Theme Hospital, players are tasked with constructing and operating an empire of hospitals in the fictional Two Point County, with the goal of curing patients of fictitious, comical ailments. Since visiting real hospitals is often unpleasant, the emphasis on humour to lighten the mood was deemed important by the developers. The game was designed and developed by some of the creators of Theme Hospital, including Mark Webley and Gary Carr.

Within weeks of release, Two Point Hospital was the second most downloaded game in the sales charts for Europe, Middle East, Africa, and Australia. The game was received positively by critics, garnering acclaim for its style, humour and its faithfulness to Theme Hospital's aesthetics, but criticised for its repetitiveness and room design. The game received seven major updates as downloadable content after its release which added regions and illnesses to cure, as well as four item packs. Successors of this game are Two Point Campus, released in 2022, and Two Point Museum in March 2025.

A port for Nintendo Switch 2, PlayStation 5 and Xbox Series X/S which includes all of the downloadable content, titled Two Point Hospital: Full Health Collection, is scheduled to release in September 2026.

== Gameplay ==
A typical hospital. Visible are a GP's Office, a General Diagnosis room, a toilet, and patients queuing outside a ward. At the bottom is the adviser, and the current objectives are displayed at the top-right.

Two Point Hospital features a similar style of gameplay to that of Theme Hospital. Players take on the role of a hospital administrator charged with constructing and maintaining a hospital. Tasks include building rooms and amenities that satisfy the needs (such as hunger and thirst) of patients and staff (such as toilets, staff rooms, reception desks, cafés, seating, and vending machines), expanding the hospital into new plots, the hiring and management of doctors, nurses, janitors, and assistants to maintain the hospital; and dealing with a variety of comical illnesses. The player can manage several hospitals, each with their own layout objectives. Two Point Hospital features unique, comical conditions such as "Light-Headedness" (having a light bulb for a head), "Pandemic" (having a pan on one's head), "Mock Star" (patients are Freddie Mercury impersonators), and "Animal Magnetism" (having animals stuck to the patient's body). When patients die, they sometimes become ghosts, which disrupt the hospital by terrorising patients and staff. Only janitors with the Ghost Capture skill can remove them.

The process of diagnosing patients begins in a GP's Office before they are sent for further diagnosis in other rooms, and eventually treatment. From time to time, an influx of patients with a specific disease can occur. On later levels, players can experience epidemics, during which an infectious disease spreads throughout the hospital. Players are issued with a certain number of vaccines to inoculate patients, and there is a reward if all infected patients are immunised. Otherwise, the player's reputation (a performance rating that affects the chances of new patients coming) is tarnished. Every game year, there is an awards ceremony in which the player is given performance-based rewards. Examples of objectives include: making the hospital attractive enough, and finding cures for certain diseases, though the general goal is curing as many patients as possible. The completion of challenges and other tasks awards "Kudosh", a currency that can be used to unlock items that can be placed within rooms and corridors. Players can research rooms and machine upgrades in the Research room.

Newly introduced elements include star ratings, hospital levels, and room prestige. The achievement of a one-star rating allows players to progress to the next hospital, though they may continue building up their current hospital by completing additional objectives to increase the rating to two or three stars. If the player moves on, they can return to the hospital at any time. Hospital levels are determined by the number of rooms and staff members a hospital has – increasing the level attracts more patients and skilled staff. A room's prestige is affected by its size and ornamentation, and the higher a room's prestige level, the happier staff are inside it (if staff become unhappy, they may quit).

Staff training is more complex than in Theme Hospital; all staff, not just doctors, can learn and receive qualifications that grant them skills or improve their ability in a certain department. For example, the General Practitioner skill improves a doctor's skill in the GP's Office. Additionally, staff have personalities and specialisations which affect their job performance. Assistants can run marketing programmes to attract patients with a certain illness or staff with certain skills.

The game features online leaderboards, along with co-operative and competitive multiplayer modes. An update released in October 2018 added a sandbox mode. Steam Workshop support was added in February 2019, giving players the ability to customise the pictures, walls, and floors of the hospital, either by using image files from the player's computer, or by downloading other players' items. In April 2019, the "Superbug Initiative" update added co-operative community challenges, featuring numerous goals along progression system. The community completing these goals works together towards unique in-game content as a reward for. The update added the ability to customise the game's soundtrack.

== Development ==
Two Point Hospital is a spiritual sequel to Theme Hospital, a 1997 simulation game developed by Bullfrog Productions and released by Electronic Arts. The game was developed using the Unity engine. Among those involved in the development of both games were Theme Hospital's producer Mark Webley, Theme Hospital's lead artist Gary Carr, and Theme Hospital's composer Russell Shaw. Theme Hospital followed Theme Park, also developed by Bullfrog, and there had been plans to expand the range of Theme simulation games. After Theme Hospital's release, Webley left Bullfrog to found Lionhead Studios with Peter Molyneux, Carr left to join Mucky Foot Productions, and the expansion of Bullfrog's Theme series never happened.

After they left Bullfrog, Webley and Carr continued to discuss a follow-up to Theme Hospital. Their first attempt was ER Tycoon, which was planned during Carr's time at Mucky Foot Productions but was cancelled because they could not find a publisher for the game. After postponing their ambition of continuing the Theme series for 20 years after they left Bullfrog, they founded Two Point Studios in 2016 to follow up on Theme Hospital. Carr said: "I wanted to work on something like Theme Hospital again, appealing to a broader range of people", and Webley stated that they "had been talking about this project for a number of years".

The timing of a Theme Hospital-style game was apt: art director Mark Smart said making a hospital-simulation game "felt right" and that there was "a lot of love for Theme Hospital", while studio co-founder and technical director Ben Hymers said players had been wanting a sequel to Theme Hospital for years. According to Webley and Carr, Two Point Hospital is a new game, rather than a reapplication of new assets to an existing game. The game was developed by envisioning fictional symptoms (often based on wordplay) and the means to cure them. Webley and Carr wanted to develop a graphics style that would remain "future-proof" relative to changes in graphics rendering technology, and opted to use claymation-like effects, which they found would not become dated and made it easy for players to observe on-screen situations.

Online features were an early target of the design of Two Point Hospital; Webley and Carr recognised that players of management games tend to prefer single-player experiences. They designed the online elements of the game to be opt-in and to feature asynchronous gameplay elements, including multiplayer challenges. Players would be tasked with achieving objectives such as curing patients within a set number of months and their scores would be placed on online leaderboards. Players would be able to view their progress compared to that of friends and other players during the challenge from these leaderboards, an approach Webley and Carr took from ghosts (a recorded version of a racer that replays a time record for a given track) that are used in some racing games. Hymers said Two Point Hospital would feature mod support, which was not available at launch.

To produce the game, Webley and Carr considered a few approaches before signing with Sega. They originally considered crowdfunding the development through Kickstarter. Shortly afterwards, however, they found video game development via Kickstarter was waning and decided this approach was too risky. They considered taking an early access approach. Hymers suggested they approach Sega as a publisher, which was fortuitous because Sega wanted to expand their profile with games similar to Theme Hospital. While they were in negotiations with Sega, they selected a number of Lionhead Studios developers to help with Two Point Hospital's development. However, Microsoft closed Lionhead in April 2016 before the Sega deal was complete and they had to quickly choose their staff on limited funds.

According to Hymers, the developers used their experience in making games including Theme Hospital, Populous, and Black & White to make Two Point Hospital. Smart said the team wanted the game to be accessible and that they wanted players to have confidence when examining the sub-menus and realising the level of strategy involved. Smart also said people do not like to visit hospitals and that using humour makes a difference to the atmosphere. According to Smart, the ailments were concocted from "terrible puns", or backwards from what someone wanted.

Hymers said that patient queues and their movement along corridors were difficult to develop because the game is in 3D, which raised questions about wall thickness and cell width. He believed that this was less of an issue in Theme Hospital, which is 2D with graphics made from sprites, and that people were drawn in front of the walls. He stated that making people avoid each other was tricky. A patch for the game added character customisation and a "copy and paste" rooms feature.

=== Sound ===
The sound effects were created by Tom Puttick and Phil French of Cedar Studios (with Shaw being the audio director) using an Audient ASP880 pre-amplifier, which facilitated the conversion of the two-channel setup into a 10-channel setup. Two Point Studios gave Cedar Studios a brief for the music that enabled them to create "elevator music with a jukebox feel". Ambient tree sound effects were recorded in Guildford, Surrey, river sounds in Scotland, and waves on a beach in Spain. Other background sounds were recorded in a hospital. They went to Two Point Studios' offices to record their staff members and emotive sounds for the interactions.

Their original intention was to create all the sound effects themselves and not use any samples, but they changed their minds when they saw the machines (which diagnose or treat patients) in the game. Many of the sounds they created originally sounded too realistic; for example, Cubism (a disease which causes the patient's body to become a set of cubes) sounded "a bit gory" and was changed to make it more bubbly. For the user interface, Puttick and French originally used real-world sounds. One of the most difficult parts of the sound implementation was making the machines sound the same on all three game speeds.

According to French, the process of creating the sounds was "weird"; it included watching animations and "looking at everything that could make a sound" in an effort to figure out how to recreate those sounds. For example, an umbrella, some straws, and a yoghurt drink were used by French to create the sounds for Chromotherapy (a disease which causes patients to turn grey and requires them to be re-coloured). French stated that the songwriting process began with a guitar or piano riff together with percussion elements (which included bongos and claves). They recorded many sounds of their own in the studio, for example, French made his own instrument by using PVC bathroom pipes, which was sampled so it could be played on a keyboard.

The DJ voice-overs were recorded with voice actor Marc Silk at his studio. The voice-overs were then sent to Cedar Studios, and Puttick and French went through them and chose the best ones to put in the game. Due to the presence of a radio DJ, Two Point Studios did not want the songs to have any vocals. For one of the radio advertisements, singer Sophie Worsley was hired to sing the lyrics sung by the game's popstar. The public address voices were recorded at Cedar Studios, and Puttick and French added the public address effect.

== Release ==
Two Point Hospital was announced on 16 January 2018 in a short YouTube video showing the game's visuals and comedic styling, and depicted a patient suffering from Light Headedness. Edge compared this disease's role in the game's marketing to that of Theme Hospital's Bloaty Head, which was described as its "poster disease".

The first public viewing of Two Point Hospital was held at the PC Gamer Weekender event on 17 February 2018. The gameplay demo explored the game's user interface and its turning camera, which was not present in Theme Hospital. The game's publisher announced a potential release date in August 2018. The panel discussed some of the new ailments that would be included in the game, confirming one that changes the patient into a mummy. In a GamesTM preview, Smart stated that the closest illness in the game to a real one is Hurty Leg, which he described as "almost like somebody in plaster". Developer Two Point Studios announced in a newsletter that subscribers would receive a "golden ticket" that would allow the player to download an in-game "golden toilet".

In July 2018, Steam began accepting pre-orders for the game, which was released on 30 August 2018, for Linux, macOS, and Windows. On 2 September 2018, Two Point Hospital was the second most-downloaded game in Europe, the Middle East, Africa, and Australia. A Halloween patch was released on 23 October 2018, which introduced a "creepier" soundtrack, new DJ lines, a night-time intervention, and the 'Frightheadedness' disease. A free update in March 2019 added decorative objects based on other game series on Steam, including Total War: Three Kingdoms, Endless Space, Football Manager, and Half-Life 2.

The game's first paid downloadable content, "Bigfoot", was released on 5 December 2018. It adds additional hospital scenarios set in snow-based areas and a number of illnesses to be cured related to the setting, among other improvements. On 18 March 2019, the "Pebberley Island" add-on was released. It is set on a tropical island and adds 34 diseases. The third expansion, "Close Encounters", released on 29 August 2019 adds science fiction elements such as aliens and the mysterious "Chasm 24". The fourth expansion, "Off the Grid", was released on 25 March 2020, and adds plant-themed ailments and items with a focus on eco-friendliness. "Culture Shock", released in October 2020, introduced hospitals in culture settings like a film studio, which alongside curing patients with diseases, will need to help with creating a television medical drama. "A Stitch in Time", released in February 2021, added hospital settings in different time eras along with medical conditions specific to those periods.

Sega announced in July 2019 that the game will be brought to Nintendo Switch, PlayStation 4, and Xbox One consoles, with all post-release updates that have been added to the personal computer version including the "Bigfoot" expansion, sometime later in 2019. The release for consoles was pushed to 25 February 2020, with the developers trying to better implement the game for console systems. A Jumbo edition release for consoles, which includes all prior DLC and the "Off the Grid" and "Close Encounters" packs, released on 5 March 2021. The game was released for Amazon Luna on 19 November 2020.

=== Full Health Collection ===
In June 2026, Sega announced a port for Nintendo Switch 2, PlayStation 5 and Xbox Series X/S titled Two Point Hospital: Full Health Collection, which will include the game itself and all of its downloadable content. It was released digitally on 16 September 2026, while the physical edition will follow on 6 November of the same year.

== Reception ==
Reception

Aggregate score
Aggregator	Score
Metacritic	83/100 (PC); 85/100 (Switch); 82/100 (PS4); 85/100 (XONE)

Review scores
Publication	Score
Edge	8/10
Game Informer	7.5/10
GameRevolution	4.5/5
GamesMaster	89%
GameSpot	8/10
GamesRadar+	5/5
GamesTM	9/10
IGN	8.4/10
Jeuxvideo.com	18/20
PC Gamer (UK)	87%
Metro	8/10
Daily Mirror	4/5
Bit-Tech	Excellent
Hardcore Gamer	4.5/5
Shacknews	9/10
Newsweek	8.5/10
CGMagazine	9/10

Two Point Hospital was received positively by critics. Media review aggregation website Metacritic summarised the game as garnering "generally favorable reviews".

Critics were especially positive about how it holds up in comparison to Theme Hospital, with many giving praise for its nostalgic value as well as the improvements. Rachel Weber of GamesRadar+ was positive about the game's use of nostalgia, stating that the game had "taken the funny bones" from the original and transplanted them into Two Point Hospital. Game Informer's Ben Reeves thought that Two Point Studios had done "a remarkable job reviving Theme Hospital". GamesMaster described Two Point Hospital as "the perfect cure" for the "Bullfrog deficiency" and said it is precisely what Theme Hospital fans wanted it to be. Even before release, Dominic Tarason of Rock, Paper, Shotgun described Two Point Hospital as "Theme Hospital 2 in all but name", a view shared by Bit-Tech's Rick Lane and GamesTM. Similar views were held by Edge, Johnny Chiodini of Eurogamer, and Jacob Bukacek of Hardcore Gamer. Other critics who noted the similarity to Theme Hospital include Jeuxvideo.com and James Ide of the Daily Mirror.

The game's humour was widely praised by critics. UK newspaper Metro regarded the "amusing script and visual humour" of Two Point Hospital as one of its best features, calling it "endearing". Nic Reuben of Rock, Paper, Shotgun also commented on the game's humour, writing: "it's not that any individual element is hilarious – it's more of an infinite dads pulling infinite crackers sort of scenario. It just feels comfy, goofy and pleasant ..." James Swinbanks of GameSpot and GamesRadar+'s Rachel Weber echoed these sentiments by complimented the game's British sense of humour. GamesTM believed the humour was taken from Bullfrog and praised the balance, saying the game is not "trying too hard" and keeps it light-hearted. Steven Asarch of US magazine Newsweek with this sentiment, and lauded the game's "sick, depraved sense of humor".

Shacknews's Chris Jarrard liked the sound effect and believed that the game's "outstanding" radio station helps put Two Point Hospital on par with Bullfrog games. José Cabrera of IGN Spain was positive about the gameplay, referring to the game as being "fun and light-hearted" and praising its addictiveness along with Asarch. Cabrera also called the game a "perfectly balanced simulation". TJ Hafer believed Two Point Hospital "revitalizes the business management genre". Fraser Brown of PC Gamer magazine agreed with Hafer, calling it a "brilliant management game, regardless of nostalgia". The presentation was also received well. Whereas Weber was complimentary of the visuals, calling them a "delight", Paul Tamburro of Game Revolution lauded the "seriously impressive" user interface specifically, believing that the game took "all the work out of management". He and Weber liked the learning curve. The characters and animation were commended by Reeves, who believed they were influenced by Aardman Animations, and Brendan Frye of Canadian magazine CGMagazine likewise thought the animation is similar to Wallace and Gromit. Brown, however, was critical of the game's balance, stating that some "missions bleed together" and only a few levels are noticeably distinct.

Some reviewers were more critical of the similarities to Theme Hospital. GamesTM believed that Two Point Hospital is too similar to Theme Hospital, saying that more could have been done to distance itself from it. The room design received critique. Jarrard found that item placement and hospital construction can be "incredibly frustrating" when one is not used to it. He further stated that he believed some room types were not fully thought out and working them into the hospital is not easy. Reeves disliked needing to build a hospital from scratch when moving to a new one. Other criticisms were levied at the game's repetition, the lack of an ability to copy rooms, and the lack of a sandbox mode.

The PC version of the game sold 1 million units.

=== Awards ===
Year	Category	Institution or publication	Result	Notes	Ref.
2018	Best Strategy Game	Game Critics Awards	Nominated		
2018	PC Game of the Year	Golden Joystick Awards	Nominated		
2019	Game, Simulation	National Academy of Video Game Trade Reviewers Awards	Nominated		
2019	British Game	15th British Academy Games Awards	Nominated		
2019	Best Original IP	Develop:Star Awards	Won		
2019	Game of the Year	Develop:Star Awards	Nominated		
2020	Strategy/Simulation	2020 Webby Awards	Nominated		

The game won the "Editor's Choice" award from both PC Gamer UK and Game Revolution. Polygon also awarded Two Point Hospital its Polygon Recommends badge. Two Point Hospital was ranked number six on Bit-Tech's "Best Games of 2018" list. In 2020, Rock, Paper, Shotgun rated it number 6 on their best management games for the PC.

== See also ==
- Project Hospital and Galacticare, games compared to Two Point Hospital
