= Cadaver (video game) =

1990 video game

- Developer: Bitmap Brothers
- Publisher: Image Works
- Producer: Graeme Boxall
- Designers: Mike Montgomery; Steve Kelly; Eric Matthews; Phil Wilcock
- Programmers: Mike Montgomery; Sean Griffiths
- Artists: Daniel Malone; Robin Chapman
- Composer: Richard Joseph
- Platforms: Amiga, Atari ST, MS-DOS
- Release: August 1990
- Genre: Action-adventure
- Mode: Single-player

Cadaver is an isometric action-adventure game by the Bitmap Brothers, originally released by Image Works in August 1990, for Atari ST, Amiga, and MS-DOS. A Mega Drive version was planned, but never released. In the game, the player controls Karadoc the dwarf.

== Plot and levels ==
Screenshot from original Cadaver release

In the original Cadaver, Karadoc, who is a gold-hungry dwarf and really just hopes to find a treasure, is on a mission to seek out and kill the necromancer Dianos, the sole remaining inhabitant of Castle Wulf.

The game consists of five levels representing different floors of Castle Wulf. Entering the castle via the sewers, Karadoc works his way up from the dungeons, through guard chambers, the royal hall, the king's private chambers and the battlements within Dianos's sanctum.

Karadoc's main modus operandi is picking up, throwing, pulling, pushing and stacking objects. By piling up a number of boxes, bones or other items, it is possible to reach higher places. Karadoc can find and use a small number of weapons such as rocks and shuriken, but puzzles are the main driving force behind the gameplay.

The game is heavily scripted. The isometric objects can react to a variety of other objects; for instance, a poisoned key can be cleaned by dropping a vial of water on it, and potions can be enhanced by the potion booster spell. The game has a wide assortment of puzzles, requiring items to be found and used in a variety of places. The solutions to these puzzles sometimes require leaps in logic and the game has plenty of secret areas, hidden spells etc. Many of the puzzles also have multiple solutions, and there is often no specific order in which the puzzles on a level must be solved.

== Gameplay ==
=== Movement ===
The game is played using a joystick, which can control the movement of Karadoc in 8 directions. The directions are not as one would expect in a game from today; instead, they are rotated. If the joystick is pushed up, Karadoc will run "north", which is right-up on the screen. To move Karadoc up on the screen (which is "north-west" in the game), it is necessary to push the joystick left-up. The fire button of the joystick is used to jump.

=== Interaction with objects ===
When Karadoc touches an object, he can push it around, unless it is too heavy (a potion of strength allows pushing heavier objects). Touching an object also enables the context menu. When the context menu is enabled, the fire button is used to select an action from the menu instead of jumping. The possible actions depend on the type of object, and are represented with icons. They include things like investigate, pull, pick-up, drink, open, insert, give and some others. Items that are picked up land in Karadocs inventory, and get additional actions, such as cast for spells. One item at a time can also be readied, usually a weapon, which makes the fire button throw or use the readied item instead of jumping.

== Development ==
Cadaver was initially developed as a level building tool on the Atari ST for adventure games, named the Adventure Level Editor, which was used to create Cadaver's levels. Levels in ALE are initially created as a two-dimensional map, where the designer may define the size of each room (within the range of 3 x 3 to 10 x 10 tiles) and show interconnections between each room. After a room is created, it is converted to 3D, and background details and objects are added manually.

Cadaver is programmed in ACL, a programming language developed by the Bitmap Brothers' Steve Kelly. Objects in Cadaver are assigned a number, and associated with that number is ACL code which indicates how the object is manipulated under different circumstances, i.e. indicating if an object can be opened or used as a container. Events such as locking and unlocking doors are also controlled by ACL.

== Expansion pack ==
An expansion pack titled Cadaver: The Payoff was released in 1991. After defeating Dianos, Karadoc returns to the inn only to find his employers gone, and every living person within the city either dead or transformed into a monster. Seeking the cause behind this, the dwarf fights his way to the local temple. He finds the answers and his money deep down in the crypts.

Gameplay is similar to the original game. Cadaver: The Payoff has only four levels, but they are significantly more complex and taxing than those of the first game, and the second level has a large number of monsters and scant possibilities to heal.

== Demos ==
Screenshot from the Cadaver episode The Last Supper

There are three levels besides the nine from the two official releases:

- Gatehouse, an early preview demo of the game, released on Amiga Format Cover Disk #13.
- Temple.
- The Last Supper, a demo released on Zero Coverdisk #15 in issue 23. The story takes place in the "Zeigenhoff" building, and sometimes this demo is referred to by that name.

== Reception ==
The game was received well at its release. The Atari version was awarded as "C+VG HIT" in Computer and Video Games magazine issue 107 in 1990. In the same year, the Amiga version received a "CU Screen Star" from CU Amiga Magazine and was an "Amiga Joker Hit" in Amiga Joker magazine, amongst others.

The One gave the Amiga version of Cadaver: The Pay-Off an overall score of 88%, calling it a "worthwhile" expansion and expressing that it has "improvements in almost every department" over the original Cadaver. The One praised The Pay-Off's new content and similar difficulty, stating that "players who have completed Cadaver will enjoy the greater variety and continued challenge".

According to the official site, it has received the following awards:

- Golden Chalice 1990 Adventure Game of the Year
- Generation 4 1990 Best Foreign Adventure
- Golden Chalice Adventure Game of the Year
