= The Bitmap Brothers =

British video game developer company

- Industry: Video games
- Founded: 1987
- Headquarters: Wapping, United Kingdom
- Key people: Mike Montgomery; Eric Matthews; Steve Kelly; Mark Coleman; Dan Malone; Ed Bartlett; John Phillips; Jamie Barber; John Kershaw; Steve Cargill
- Products: Xenon series Speedball series The Chaos Engine series
- Website: bitmap-brothers.co.uk (archived)

The Bitmap Brothers is a British video game developer founded in 1987 by Mike Montgomery, Eric Matthews, and Steve Kelly. The company released its first title, the scrolling shooter Xenon, in 1988. Shortly thereafter, it released Speedball. Prior to publishing its own games (as Renegade Software), early Bitmap Brothers titles were distributed by Image Works and Konami.

The Bitmap Brothers released several games on the Amiga, Atari ST, Acorn Archimedes, and other DOS machines. The company came to prominence partly because it developed many different types of games, and most of these titles became highly regarded entries in their respective genres. The Bitmap Brothers' PC games have never matched the sales of their previous Amiga titles, however, even despite garnering positive critical reviews in the press.

Frequently characterized as rockstars, Montgomery, Matthews, and Kelly once posed in dark sunglasses next to Robert Maxwell's helicopter. Maxwell owned Mirrorsoft, the publisher of a number of their games.

After 2002, the company released ports of several of its games for both the Game Boy Advance and Pocket PC. Since then, it has been licensing its older games to several other companies interested in modern platform ports.

== History ==
The Bitmap Brothers was based in Wapping, East London and was privately owned. The company's managing director was Mike Montgomery, who founded the company together with Eric Matthews and Steve Kelly. Montgomery later went on to take sole control of the business.

Mark John Coleman is a computer graphics developer who frequently worked with The Bitmap Brothers and, along with Dan Malone, was responsible for the visual style that became a trademark of The Bitmap Brothers' games. Other key staff included Technical Director John Phillips, Art Director John Kershaw, Business Development Director Ed Bartlett and Creative Director Jamie Barber.

The Bitmap Brothers became known for the high difficulty of their games. Montgomery later remarked that "all of the Bitmap Brothers games... they're probably a bit too difficult. The reason for that was we designed games that we wanted to play - for us it was actually quite hard to think that somebody would want to play something that's easy." The development team was voted Best 16-bit Programmers of the Year at the Golden Joystick Awards in 1989. Speedball was also voted best 16-bit Game of the Year overall.

In a 2024 interview with video game documentarian Danny O'Dwyer, Charles Cecil of fellow British video game developers Revolution Software recalled an interaction between The Bitmap Brothers and American video game publisher Acclaim Entertainment. After the death of Robert Maxwell and various financial troubles, Mirrorsoft was acquired by Acclaim in 1992. Multiple companies previously owned by Mirrorsoft, such as The Bitmap Brothers and Revolution Software, consequently sought to terminate their contracts but were met with resistance from Acclaim. Acclaim sent letters to these companies expressing dissatisfaction with the companies' intentions to terminate their respective partnerships. According to Cecil, the letters ended with two checkboxes: one for "YES" to acknowledge and accept continued partnership with Acclaim, and one for "NO". The Bitmap Brothers allegedly wrote in a third option for "FUCK OFF," marked it, and returned the letter to Acclaim.

Two former core members of the company — Mike Montgomery and John Phillips — went on to found Tower Studios (along with Sensible Software founder Jon Hare), and stated their involvement with The Bitmap Brothers ended in 2004.

Business Development Director, Ed Bartlett went on to pioneer the in-game advertising industry, initially with Hive Partners and then with IGA Worldwide.

After years of silence, a news post on The Bitmap Brothers' official website announced Speedball 2 Tournament. Speedball 2 Tournament was released in November 2007 by Frogster Interactive but failed to achieve the success of previous titles in the franchise.

In October 2010, it was announced that Speedball 2 would be released for the iPhone and iPad, with Vivid Games managing the port.

A mobile version of Z was developed by Peter Harrap and TickTock Games. It was published by KavCom in 2011 initially for iOS, utilizing a touch-screen control scheme. The port was then released on BlackBerry Playbook, Android, and Kindle in 2012. The mobile version remake by TickTock Games was also released for Mac in 2012, and then published by Kiss Ltd and KavCom for Windows PC on Steam and GOG.com on 4 July 2014. The Steam release was followed by a release of Z: Steel Soldiers the next month.

On 2 July 2012, Speedball 2: Evolution was announced and released for Android via the Google Play Store, and in 2013 The Chaos Engine was remade for PC, Linux, and Mac.

Rebellion Developments acquired the Bitmap Brothers back catalogue in November 2019.

== Games developed ==
List of video games developed by The Bitmap Brothers
Year	Title	Original platform(s)	Notes
1988	Xenon	Atari ST	—N/a
1988	Speedball	Atari ST, Amiga	—N/a
1989	Xenon 2: Megablast	Atari ST, Amiga	—N/a
1990	Cadaver	Atari ST, Amiga, MS-DOS	The Payoff expansion released in 1991.
1990	Speedball 2: Brutal Deluxe	Atari ST, Amiga	—N/a
1991	Gods	Atari ST, Amiga	—N/a
1991	Magic Pockets	Atari ST, Amiga	—N/a
1993	The Chaos Engine	Atari ST, Amiga	Known as Soldiers of Fortune in the US.
1996	The Chaos Engine 2	Amiga	—N/a
1996	Z	MS-DOS	—N/a
1998	Z and Z Expansion Kit	Windows	Windows 95 port of Z with additional content.
2000	Speedball 2100	PlayStation	Remake of Speedball 2: Brutal Deluxe.
2000	Xenon 2000: Project PCF	Windows	Remake of Xenon 2: Megablast.
2001	Z: Steel Soldiers	Windows	—N/a
2003	World War II: Frontline Command	Windows	—N/a

=== Cancelled games ===
- Bike / Triple X / Havoc
- Speedball Arena
- Warbots
- Brutal Deluxe / ブルータル デラックス
