= List of video games listed among the best =

The following video games have appeared on various publications' lists of "best" or "greatest" video games of all time. Each game is included on best-of lists from at least six different publications, assembled by editorial staff or expert panels and not limited in scope by era, genre, or platform. Some lists reflect a publication's differing set of values as to what makes a given game "best". For instance, Hardcore Gaming 101 aimed to give a broad overview of many different types of games across the medium's history in its 2015 list, while IGN based its 2021 list on how fun a game was at the present.

Lists of best video games of all time are commonly produced by outlets that cover video games; game scholars Mark Kretzschmar and Sara Raffel commented in 2023 that nearly all such websites will publish multiple "Best Video Games Ever Made" lists. This list's entries are compiled from over 100 different best-of lists, representing 61 unique publications.

== List ==
There are currently 376 games in this list.

video games considered the best
Year	Game	Genre	Developer	Publisher	Original platform(s) (Note: "PC" includes Microsoft's line of MS-DOS and Windows operating systems)	Ref.
1971	The Oregon Trail	Strategy	MECC		HP 2100	(Note: The Oregon Trail:)
1972	Pong	Sports	Atari, Inc.		Arcade	(Note: Pong:)
1977	Combat	Top-down shooter	Atari, Inc.		Atari 2600	(Note: Combat:)
1977	Zork	Adventure	Infocom		PDP-10	(Note: Zork:)
1978	Space Invaders	Shoot 'em up	Taito		Arcade	(Note: Space Invaders:)
1979	Asteroids	Shoot 'em up	Atari, Inc.		Arcade	(Note: Asteroids:)
1980	Adventure	Action-adventure	Atari, Inc.		Atari 2600	(Note: Adventure:)
1980	Battlezone	Vehicle simulation	Atari, Inc.		Arcade	(Note: Battlezone:)
1980	Missile Command	Shoot 'em up	Atari, Inc.		Arcade	(Note: Missile Command:)
1980	Pac-Man	Maze	Namco		Arcade	(Note: Pac-Man:)
1981	Centipede	Shoot 'em up	Atari, Inc.		Arcade	(Note: Centipede:)
1981	Defender	Shoot 'em up	Williams Electronics		Arcade	(Note: Defender:)
1981	Donkey Kong	Platform	Nintendo R&D1	Nintendo	Arcade	(Note: Donkey Kong:)
1981	Frogger	Action	Konami	Konami, Sega	Arcade	(Note: Frogger:)
1981	Galaga	Shoot 'em up	Namco		Arcade	(Note: Galaga:)
1981	Tempest	Shoot 'em up	Atari, Inc.		Arcade	(Note: Tempest:)
1981	Wizardry: Proving Grounds of the Mad Overlord	Role-playing	Sir-Tech		Apple II	(Note: Wizardry: Proving Grounds of the Mad Overlord:)
1981	Zaxxon	Shoot 'em up	Sega		Arcade	(Note: Zaxxon:)
1982	Joust	Action	Williams Electronics		Arcade	(Note: Joust:)
1982	Ms. Pac-Man	Maze	General Computer Corporation	Midway	Arcade	(Note: Ms. Pac-Man:)
1982	Pitfall!	Platform	Activision		Atari 2600	(Note: Pitfall!:)
1982	Pole Position	Racing	Namco		Arcade	(Note: Pole Position:)
1982	Robotron: 2084	Top-down shooter	Vid Kidz	Williams Electronics	Arcade	(Note: Robotron: 2084:)
1983	Archon: The Light and the Dark	Strategy	Free Fall Associates	Electronic Arts	Atari 8-bit	(Note: Archon: The Light and the Dark:)
1983	Lode Runner	Platform	Doug Smith	Broderbund	Apple II	(Note: Lode Runner:)
1983	M.U.L.E.	Business simulation	Ozark Softscape	Electronic Arts	Atari 8-bit, Commodore 64	
1983	Star Wars	Rail shooter	Atari, Inc.		Arcade	(Note: Star Wars:)
1984	Elite	Space flight simulator	David Braben and Ian Bell	Acornsoft	BBC Micro	(Note: Elite:)
1984	Marble Madness	Action	Atari Games		Arcade	(Note: Marble Madness:)
1985	Gauntlet	Hack and slash	Atari Games		Arcade	(Note: Gauntlet:)
1985	Ghosts 'n Goblins	Platform	Capcom		Arcade	(Note: Ghosts 'n Goblins:)
1985	A Mind Forever Voyaging	Adventure	Infocom		Apple II, Commodore 128, PC, Mac	(Note: A Mind Forever Voyaging:)
1985	Super Mario Bros.	Platform	Nintendo R&D4	Nintendo	NES	(Note: Super Mario Bros.:)
1985	Tetris	Puzzle	Alexey Pajitnov	Elorg	Electronika 60	(Note: Tetris:)
1985	Ultima IV: Quest of the Avatar	Role-playing	Origin Systems		Apple II	(Note: Ultima IV: Quest of the Avatar:)
1986	Arkanoid	Block breaker	Taito		Arcade	(Note: Arkanoid:)
1986	Bubble Bobble	Platform	Taito		Arcade	(Note: Bubble Bobble:)
1986	Castlevania	Platform	Konami		NES	(Note: Castlevania:)
1986	The Legend of Zelda	Action-adventure	Nintendo R&D4	Nintendo	NES	(Note: The Legend of Zelda:)
1986	Metroid	Action-adventure	Nintendo R&D1, Intelligent Systems	Nintendo	NES	(Note: Metroid:)
1986	Out Run	Racing	Sega		Arcade	(Note: Out Run:)
1987	Contra	Run and gun	Konami		Arcade	(Note: Contra:)
1987	Double Dragon	Beat 'em up	Technōs Japan	Taito	Arcade	(Note: Double Dragon:)
1987	Dungeon Master	Role-playing	FTL Games		Atari ST	(Note: Dungeon Master:)
1987	Head over Heels	Action-adventure	Ocean Software		ZX Spectrum	(Note: Head over Heels:)
1987	Mike Tyson's Punch-Out!!	Sports	Nintendo R&D3	Nintendo	NES	(Note: Mike Tyson's Punch-Out!!:)
1987	R-Type	Shoot 'em up	Irem		Arcade	(Note: R-Type:)
1987	Sid Meier's Pirates!	Action-adventure	MicroProse		Commodore 64	(Note: Sid Meier's Pirates!:)
1988	Mega Man 2	Platform	Capcom		NES	(Note: Mega Man 2:)
1988	Ninja Gaiden	Platform	Tecmo		NES	(Note: Ninja Gaiden:)
1988	Super Mario Bros. 3	Platform	Nintendo R&D4	Nintendo	NES	(Note: Super Mario Bros. 3:)
1989	Final Fight	Beat 'em up	Capcom		Arcade	(Note: Final Fight:)
1989	Golden Axe	Beat 'em up	Team Shinobi	Sega	Arcade	(Note: Golden Axe:)
1989	Populous	God game	Bullfrog Productions	Electronic Arts	Amiga	(Note: Populous:)
1989	Prince of Persia	Platform	Broderbund		Apple II	(Note: Prince of Persia:)
1989	SimCity	City-building	Maxis		Amiga, Mac	(Note: SimCity:)
1990	Pilotwings	Flight simulation	Nintendo EAD	Nintendo	Super NES	(Note: Pilotwings:)
1990	The Secret of Monkey Island	Adventure	Lucasfilm Games		PC	(Note: The Secret of Monkey Island:)
1990	Speedball 2: Brutal Deluxe	Sports	The Bitmap Brothers	Image Works	Amiga, Atari ST	(Note: Speedball 2: Brutal Deluxe:)
1990	Super Mario World	Platform	Nintendo EAD	Nintendo	Super NES	(Note: Super Mario World:)
1990	Wing Commander	Space flight simulator	Origin Systems		PC	(Note: Wing Commander:)
1991	Another World	Platform	Delphine Software		Amiga, Atari ST	(Note: Another World:)
1991	Civilization	Turn-based strategy	MicroProse		PC	(Note: Civilization:)
1991	Final Fantasy IV	Role-playing	Square		Super NES	(Note: Final Fantasy IV:)
1991	The Legend of Zelda: A Link to the Past	Action-adventure	Nintendo EAD	Nintendo	Super NES	(Note: The Legend of Zelda: A Link to the Past:)
1991	Lemmings	Puzzle	DMA Design	Psygnosis	Amiga	(Note: Lemmings:)
1991	Micro Machines	Racing	Codemasters	Camerica	NES	(Note: Micro Machines:)
1991	Monkey Island 2: LeChuck's Revenge	Adventure	LucasArts		PC	(Note: Monkey Island 2: LeChuck's Revenge:)
1991	Sonic the Hedgehog	Platform	Sonic Team	Sega	Sega Genesis	(Note: Sonic the Hedgehog:)
1991	Street Fighter II	Fighting	Capcom		Arcade	(Note: Street Fighter II:)
1991	Super Castlevania IV	Platform	Konami		Super NES	(Note: Super Castlevania IV:)
1992	Alone in the Dark	Survival horror	Infogrames		PC	(Note: Alone in the Dark:)
1992	Contra III: The Alien Wars	Run and gun	Konami		Super NES	(Note: Contra III: The Alien Wars:)
1992	Dune II	Real-time strategy	Westwood Studios	Virgin Games	PC	(Note: Dune II:)
1992	Flashback	Platform	Delphine Software International	U.S. Gold	Amiga	(Note: Flashback:)
1992	Indiana Jones and the Fate of Atlantis	Adventure	LucasArts		PC	(Note: Indiana Jones and the Fate of Atlantis:)
1992	Mortal Kombat	Fighting	Midway		Arcade	(Note: Mortal Kombat:)
1992	Sensible Soccer	Sports	Sensible Software	Renegade Software	Amiga, Atari ST	(Note: Sensible Soccer:)
1992	Sonic the Hedgehog 2	Platform	Sega Technical Institute	Sega	Sega Genesis	(Note: Sonic the Hedgehog 2:)
1992	Star Control II	Action-adventure	Toys for Bob	Accolade	PC	(Note: Star Control II:)
1992	Streets of Rage 2	Beat 'em up	Ancient	Sega	Sega Genesis	(Note: Streets of Rage 2:)
1992	Super Mario Kart	Kart racing	Nintendo EAD	Nintendo	Super NES	(Note: Super Mario Kart:)
1992	Ultima VII: The Black Gate	Role-playing	Origin Systems		PC	(Note: Ultima VII: The Black Gate:)
1992	Virtua Racing	Racing	Sega AM2	Sega	Arcade	(Note: Virtua Racing:)
1992	Wolfenstein 3D	First-person shooter	id Software	Apogee Software	PC	(Note: Wolfenstein 3D:)
1993	Day of the Tentacle	Adventure	LucasArts		PC	(Note: Day of the Tentacle:)
1993	Doom	First-person shooter	id Software		PC	(Note: Doom:)
1993	Gunstar Heroes	Run and gun	Treasure	Sega	Sega Genesis	(Note: Gunstar Heroes:)
1993	The Legend of Zelda: Link's Awakening	Action-adventure	Nintendo EAD	Nintendo	Game Boy	(Note: The Legend of Zelda: Link's Awakening:)
1993	Mega Man X	Platform	Capcom		Super NES	(Note: Mega Man X:)
1993	Mortal Kombat II	Fighting	Midway		Arcade	(Note: Mortal Kombat II:)
1993	Myst	Adventure	Cyan	Broderbund	Mac	(Note: Myst:)
1993	NBA Jam	Sports	Midway		Arcade	(Note: NBA Jam:)
1993	Phantasy Star IV	Role-playing	Sega		Sega Genesis	(Note: Phantasy Star IV:)
1993	Ridge Racer	Racing	Namco		Arcade	(Note: Ridge Racer:)
1993	Sam & Max Hit the Road	Adventure	LucasArts		PC	(Note: Sam & Max Hit the Road:)
1993	Secret of Mana	Action role-playing	Square		Super NES	(Note: Secret of Mana:)
1993	Samurai Shodown	Fighting	SNK		Arcade	(Note: Samurai Shodown:)
1993	SimCity 2000	City-building	Maxis		Mac	(Note: SimCity 2000:)
1993	Sonic CD	Platform	Sega		Sega CD	(Note: Sonic CD:)
1993	Star Fox	Rail shooter	Nintendo EAD, Argonaut Software	Nintendo	Super NES	(Note: Star Fox:)
1993	Syndicate	Real-time tactics	Bullfrog Productions	Electronic Arts	Amiga, PC	(Note: Syndicate:)
1994	Daytona USA	Racing	Sega AM2	Sega	Arcade	(Note: Daytona USA:)
1994	Donkey Kong Country	Platform	Rare	Nintendo	Super NES	(Note: Donkey Kong Country:)
1994	Doom II	First-person shooter	id Software		PC	(Note: Doom II:)
1994	EarthBound	Role-playing	Ape Inc., HAL Laboratory	Nintendo	Super NES	(Note: EarthBound:)
1994	Final Fantasy VI	Role-playing	Square		Super NES	(Note: Final Fantasy VI:)
1994	Puzzle Bobble	Puzzle	Taito		Arcade	(Note: Puzzle Bobble:)
1994	Sensible World of Soccer	Sports	Sensible Software	Renegade Software	Amiga	(Note: Sensible World of Soccer:)
1994	Star Wars: TIE Fighter	Space flight simulator	Totally Games	LucasArts	PC	(Note: Star Wars: TIE Fighter:)
1994	Super Metroid	Action-adventure	Nintendo R&D1, Intelligent Systems	Nintendo	Super NES	(Note: Super Metroid:)
1994	Tempest 2000	Shoot 'em up	Llamasoft	Atari Corporation	Atari Jaguar	(Note: Tempest 2000:)
1994	Theme Park	Business simulation	Bullfrog Productions	Electronic Arts	Amiga, PC	(Note: Theme Park:)
1994	Virtua Fighter 2	Fighting	Sega AM2	Sega	Arcade	(Note: Virtua Fighter 2:)
1994	X-COM: UFO Defense	Turn-based strategy	Mythos Games, MicroProse	MicroProse	PC	(Note: X-COM: UFO Defense:)
1995	Chrono Trigger	Role-playing	Square		Super NES	(Note: Chrono Trigger:)
1995	Command & Conquer	Real-time strategy	Westwood Studios		PC	(Note: Command & Conquer:)
1995	MechWarrior 2: 31st Century Combat	Vehicle simulation	Activision		PC	(Note: MechWarrior 2: 31st Century Combat:)
1995	Sega Rally Championship	Racing	Sega AM3	Sega	Arcade	(Note: Sega Rally Championship:)
1995	Warcraft II: Tides of Darkness	Real-time strategy	Blizzard Entertainment	Davidson & Associates	PC	(Note: Warcraft II: Tides of Darkness:)
1995	Wipeout	Racing	Psygnosis		PC, PlayStation	(Note: Wipeout:)
1995	Worms	Artillery	Team17	Ocean Software	Amiga	(Note: Worms:)
1995	Yoshi's Island	Platform	Nintendo EAD	Nintendo	Super NES	(Note: Yoshi's Island:)
1996	Civilization II	Turn-based strategy	MicroProse		PC	(Note: Civilization II:)
1996	Command & Conquer: Red Alert	Real-time strategy	Westwood Studios		PC	(Note: Command & Conquer: Red Alert:)
1996	Duke Nukem 3D	First-person shooter	3D Realms	FormGen	PC	(Note: Duke Nukem 3D:)
1996	Mario Kart 64	Kart racing	Nintendo EAD	Nintendo	Nintendo 64	(Note: Mario Kart 64:)
1996	Nights into Dreams	Action	Sonic Team	Sega	Saturn	(Note: Nights into Dreams...:)
1996	PaRappa the Rapper	Rhythm	NanaOn-Sha	Sony Computer Entertainment	PlayStation	(Note: PaRappa the Rapper:)
1996	Pokémon Red and Blue	Role-playing	Game Freak	Nintendo	Game Boy	(Note: Pokémon Red and Blue:)
1996	Quake	First-person shooter	id Software	GT Interactive	PC	(Note: Quake:)
1996	Resident Evil	Survival horror	Capcom		PlayStation	(Note: Resident Evil:)
1996	Super Mario 64	Platform	Nintendo EAD	Nintendo	Nintendo 64	(Note: Super Mario 64:)
1996	Tomb Raider	Action-adventure	Core Design	Eidos Interactive	Saturn, PC, PlayStation	(Note: Tomb Raider:)
1996	Wave Race 64	Racing	Nintendo EAD	Nintendo	Nintendo 64	(Note: Wave Race 64:)
1996	Wipeout 2097	Racing	Psygnosis		PlayStation	(Note: Wipeout 2097:)
1997	Age of Empires	Real-time strategy	Ensemble Studios	Microsoft	PC	(Note: Age of Empires:)
1997	Castlevania: Symphony of the Night	Action role-playing	Konami Computer Entertainment Tokyo	Konami	PlayStation	(Note: Castlevania: Symphony of the Night:)
1997	Diablo	Action role-playing	Blizzard North	Blizzard Entertainment	PC	(Note: Diablo:)
1997	Fallout	Role-playing	Interplay Productions		PC	(Note: Fallout:)
1997	Final Fantasy Tactics	Tactical role-playing	Square		PlayStation	(Note: Final Fantasy Tactics:)
1997	Final Fantasy VII	Role-playing	Square		PlayStation	(Note: Final Fantasy VII:)
1997	GoldenEye 007	First-person shooter	Rare	Nintendo	Nintendo 64	(Note: GoldenEye 007:)
1997	Gran Turismo	Racing	Polys Entertainment	Sony Computer Entertainment	PlayStation	(Note: Gran Turismo:)
1997	Grand Theft Auto	Action-adventure	DMA Design	BMG Interactive	PC	(Note: Grand Theft Auto:)
1997	Quake II	First-person shooter	id Software	Activision	PC	(Note: Quake II:)
1997	Star Fox 64	Rail shooter	Nintendo EAD	Nintendo	Nintendo 64	(Note: Star Fox 64:)
1997	Star Wars Jedi Knight: Dark Forces II	First-person shooter	LucasArts		PC	(Note: Star Wars Jedi Knight: Dark Forces II:)
1997	Tekken 3	Fighting	Namco		Arcade	(Note: Tekken 3:)
1997	Total Annihilation	Real-time strategy	Cavedog Entertainment		PC, Mac	(Note: Total Annihilation:)
1997	Ultima Online	MMORPG	Origin Systems	Electronic Arts	PC, Linux	(Note: Ultima Online:)
1998	Baldur's Gate	Role-playing	BioWare	Black Isle Studios, Interplay Entertainment	PC	(Note: Baldur's Gate:)
1998	Banjo-Kazooie	Platform	Rare	Nintendo	Nintendo 64	(Note: Banjo-Kazooie:)
1998	Crash Bandicoot: Warped	Platform	Naughty Dog	Sony Computer Entertainment	PlayStation	(Note: Crash Bandicoot: Warped:)
1998	Dance Dance Revolution	Rhythm	Bemani	Konami	Arcade	(Note: Dance Dance Revolution:)
1998	Fallout 2	Role-playing	Black Isle Studios	Interplay Entertainment	PC	(Note: Fallout 2:)
1998	Grim Fandango	Adventure	LucasArts		PC	(Note: Grim Fandango:)
1998	Half-Life	First-person shooter	Valve Corporation	Sierra Studios	PC	(Note: Half-Life:)
1998	The Legend of Zelda: Ocarina of Time	Action-adventure	Nintendo EAD	Nintendo	Nintendo 64	(Note: The Legend of Zelda: Ocarina of Time:)
1998	Metal Gear Solid	Stealth	Konami Computer Entertainment Japan	Konami	PlayStation	(Note: Metal Gear Solid:)
1998	Panzer Dragoon Saga	Role-playing	Team Andromeda	Sega	Saturn	(Note: Panzer Dragoon Saga:)
1998	Resident Evil 2	Survival horror	Capcom		PlayStation	(Note: Resident Evil 2:)
1998	Soulcalibur	Fighting	Project Soul	Namco	Arcade	(Note: Soulcalibur:)
1998	StarCraft	Real-time strategy	Blizzard Entertainment		PC	(Note: StarCraft:)
1998	Suikoden II	Role-playing	Konami Computer Entertainment Tokyo	Konami	PlayStation	(Note: Suikoden II:)
1998	Thief: The Dark Project	Stealth	Looking Glass Studios	Eidos Interactive	PC	(Note: Thief: The Dark Project:)
1998	Xenogears	Role-playing	Square Product Development Division 3	Square	PlayStation	(Note: Xenogears:)
1999	Age of Empires II	Real-time strategy	Ensemble Studios	Microsoft	PC	(Note: Age of Empires II:)
1999	Crazy Taxi	Racing	Sega AM3	Sega	Arcade	(Note: Crazy Taxi:)
1999	EverQuest	MMORPG	Verant Interactive, 989 Studios	Sony Online Entertainment	PC	(Note: EverQuest:)
1999	Final Fantasy VIII	Role-playing	Square		PlayStation	(Note: Final Fantasy VIII:)
1999	Freespace 2	Space flight simulator	Volition	Interplay Entertainment	PC	(Note: Freespace 2:)
1999	Gran Turismo 2	Racing	Polyphony Digital	Sony Computer Entertainment	PlayStation	(Note: Gran Turismo 2:)
1999	Heroes of Might and Magic III	Turn-based strategy	New World Computing	The 3DO Company	PC	(Note: Heroes of Might and Magic III:)
1999	Homeworld	Real-time strategy	Relic Entertainment	Sierra Studios	PC	(Note: Homeworld:)
1999	Planescape: Torment	Role-playing	Black Isle Studios	Interplay Entertainment	PC	(Note: Planescape: Torment:)
1999	Pokémon Gold and Silver	Role-playing	Game Freak	Nintendo	Game Boy Color	(Note: Pokémon Gold and Silver:)
1999	Quake III Arena	First-person shooter	id Software	Activision	PC	(Note: Quake III Arena:)
1999	Shenmue	Action-adventure	AM2 of CRI	Sega	Dreamcast	(Note: Shenmue:)
1999	Silent Hill	Survival horror	Team Silent	Konami	PlayStation	(Note: Silent Hill:)
1999	Street Fighter III: 3rd Strike	Fighting	Capcom		Arcade	(Note: Street Fighter III: 3rd Strike:)
1999	System Shock 2	Action role-playing	Irrational Games, Looking Glass Studios	Electronic Arts	PC	(Note: System Shock 2:)
1999	Tony Hawk's Pro Skater	Sports	Neversoft	Activision	PlayStation	(Note: Tony Hawk's Pro Skater:)
1999	Unreal Tournament	First-person shooter	Epic Games, Digital Extremes	GT Interactive	PC	(Note: Unreal Tournament:)
2000	Baldur's Gate II: Shadows of Amn	Role-playing	BioWare	Black Isle Studios, Interplay Entertainment	PC	(Note: Baldur's Gate II: Shadows of Amn:)
2000	Counter-Strike	First-person shooter	Valve Corporation	Sierra Studios	PC	(Note: Counter-Strike:)
2000	Deus Ex	Action role-playing	Ion Storm	Eidos Interactive	PC	(Note: Deus Ex:)
2000	Diablo II	Action role-playing	Blizzard North	Blizzard Entertainment	PC	(Note: Diablo II:)
2000	Final Fantasy IX	Role-playing	Square		PlayStation	(Note: Final Fantasy IX:)
2000	Jet Set Radio	Action	Smilebit	Sega	Dreamcast	(Note: Jet Set Radio:)
2000	The Legend of Zelda: Majora's Mask	Action-adventure	Nintendo EAD	Nintendo	Nintendo 64	(Note: The Legend of Zelda: Majora's Mask:)
2000	Perfect Dark	First-person shooter	Rare		Nintendo 64	(Note: Perfect Dark:)
2000	Marvel vs. Capcom 2: New Age of Heroes	Fighting	Capcom		Arcade	(Note: Marvel vs. Capcom 2: New Age of Heroes:)
2000	The Sims	Life simulation	Maxis	Electronic Arts	PC	(Note: The Sims:)
2000	Skies of Arcadia	Role-playing	Overworks	Sega	Dreamcast	(Note: Skies of Arcadia:)
2000	Thief II: The Metal Age	Stealth	Looking Glass Studios	Eidos Interactive	PC	(Note: Thief II: The Metal Age:)
2000	Tony Hawk's Pro Skater 2	Sports	Neversoft	Activision	PlayStation	(Note: Tony Hawk's Pro Skater 2:)
2000	Vagrant Story	Action role-playing	Square Product Development Division 4	Square	PlayStation	(Note: Vagrant Story:)
2001	Advance Wars	Turn-based strategy	Intelligent Systems	Nintendo	Game Boy Advance	(Note: Advance Wars:)
2001	Animal Crossing	Life simulation	Nintendo EAD	Nintendo	Nintendo 64	(Note: Animal Crossing:)
2001	Devil May Cry	Action-adventure	Capcom Production Studio 4	Capcom	PS2	(Note: Devil May Cry:)
2001	Final Fantasy X	Role-playing	Square Product Development Division 1	Square	PS2	(Note: Final Fantasy X:)
2001	Gran Turismo 3: A-Spec	Racing	Polyphony Digital	Sony Computer Entertainment	PS2	(Note: Gran Turismo 3: A-Spec:)
2001	Grand Theft Auto III	Action-adventure	DMA Design	Rockstar Games	PS2	(Note: Grand Theft Auto III:)
2001	Halo: Combat Evolved	First-person shooter	Bungie	Microsoft Game Studios	Xbox	(Note: Halo: Combat Evolved:)
2001	Ico	Action-adventure	Sony Computer Entertainment Japan	Sony Computer Entertainment	PS2	(Note: Ico:)
2001	Ikaruga	Shoot 'em up	Treasure		Arcade	(Note: Ikaruga:)
2001	Max Payne	Third-person shooter	Remedy Entertainment	Gathering of Developers	PC	(Note: Max Payne:)
2001	Metal Gear Solid 2: Sons of Liberty	Stealth	Konami Computer Entertainment Japan	Konami	PS2	(Note: Metal Gear Solid 2: Sons of Liberty:)
2001	Phoenix Wright: Ace Attorney	Adventure	Capcom Production Studio 4	Capcom	Game Boy Advance	(Note: Phoenix Wright: Ace Attorney:)
2001	Rez	Rail shooter	United Game Artists	Sega	Dreamcast, PS2	(Note: Rez:)
2001	Silent Hill 2	Survival horror	Team Silent	Konami	PS2	(Note: Silent Hill 2:)
2001	Super Smash Bros. Melee	Fighting	HAL Laboratory	Nintendo	GameCube	(Note: Super Smash Bros. Melee:)
2001	Tony Hawk's Pro Skater 3	Sports	Neversoft	Activision	PlayStation, PS2	(Note: Tony Hawk's Pro Skater 3:)
2001	Virtua Fighter 4	Fighting	Sega AM2	Sega	Arcade	(Note: Virtua Fighter 4:)
2002	Battlefield 1942	First-person shooter	Digital Illusions CE	Electronic Arts	PC	(Note: Battlefield 1942:)
2002	The Elder Scrolls III: Morrowind	Action role-playing	Bethesda Game Studios	Bethesda Softworks	PC	(Note: The Elder Scrolls III: Morrowind:)
2002	Eternal Darkness: Sanity's Requiem	Survival horror	Silicon Knights	Nintendo	GameCube	(Note: Eternal Darkness: Sanity's Requiem:)
2002	Grand Theft Auto: Vice City	Action-adventure	Rockstar North	Rockstar Games	PS2	(Note: Grand Theft Auto: Vice City:)
2002	Kingdom Hearts	Action role-playing	Square		PS2	(Note: Kingdom Hearts:)
2002	The Legend of Zelda: The Wind Waker	Action-adventure	Nintendo EAD	Nintendo	GameCube	(Note: The Legend of Zelda: The Wind Waker:)
2002	Metroid Prime	Action-adventure	Retro Studios	Nintendo	GameCube	(Note: Metroid Prime:)
2002	Soulcalibur II	Fighting	Project Soul	Namco	Arcade	(Note: Soulcalibur II:)
2002	Tom Clancy's Splinter Cell	Stealth	Ubi Soft Montreal	Ubi Soft	Xbox	(Note: Tom Clancy's Splinter Cell:)
2002	Warcraft III: Reign of Chaos	Real-time strategy	Blizzard Entertainment		PC, Mac	(Note: Warcraft III: Reign of Chaos:)
2003	Beyond Good & Evil	Action-adventure	Ubisoft Pictures, Ubisoft Milan	Ubisoft	PS2	(Note: Beyond Good & Evil:)
2003	F-Zero GX	Racing	Amusement Vision	Nintendo	GameCube	(Note: F-Zero GX:)
2003	Max Payne 2: The Fall of Max Payne	Third-person shooter	Remedy Entertainment	Rockstar Games	PC	(Note: Max Payne 2:)
2003	Prince of Persia: The Sands of Time	Action-adventure	Ubisoft Montreal	Ubisoft	GameCube, PS2, Xbox	(Note: Prince of Persia: The Sands of Time:)
2003	Star Wars: Knights of the Old Republic	Role-playing	BioWare	Microsoft Game Studios, LucasArts	Xbox	(Note: Star Wars: Knights of the Old Republic:)
2003	Viewtiful Joe	Beat 'em up	Capcom Production Studio 4	Capcom	GameCube	(Note: Viewtiful Joe:)
2003	WarioWare, Inc.: Mega Microgames!	Action	Nintendo R&D1	Nintendo	Game Boy Advance	(Note: WarioWare, Inc.: Mega Microgames!:)
2004	Burnout 3: Takedown	Racing	Criterion Games	Electronic Arts	PS2, Xbox	(Note: Burnout 3: Takedown:)
2004	The Chronicles of Riddick: Escape from Butcher Bay	Stealth	Starbreeze Studios, Tigon Studios	Vivendi Universal Games	Xbox	(Note: The Chronicles of Riddick: Escape from Butcher Bay:)
2004	Dragon Quest VIII	Role-playing	Level-5	Square Enix	PS2	(Note: Dragon Quest VIII:)
2004	Gran Turismo 4	Racing	Polyphony Digital	Sony Computer Entertainment	PS2	(Note: Gran Turismo 4:)
2004	Grand Theft Auto: San Andreas	Action-adventure	Rockstar North	Rockstar Games	PS2	(Note: Grand Theft Auto: San Andreas:)
2004	Half-Life 2	First-person shooter	Valve Corporation		PC	(Note: Half-Life 2:)
2004	Halo 2	First-person shooter	Bungie	Microsoft Game Studios	Xbox	(Note: Halo 2:)
2004	Katamari Damacy	Action	Namco		PS2	(Note: Katamari Damacy:)
2004	Lumines: Puzzle Fusion	Puzzle	Q Entertainment	Bandai	PSP	(Note: Lumines: Puzzle Fusion:)
2004	Metal Gear Solid 3: Snake Eater	Stealth	Konami Computer Entertainment Japan	Konami	PS2	(Note: Metal Gear Solid 3: Snake Eater:)
2004	Rome: Total War	Strategy	Creative Assembly	Activision	PC	(Note: Rome: Total War:)
2004	The Sims 2	Life simulation	Maxis Redwood Shores	Electronic Arts	PC	(Note: The Sims 2:)
2004	World of Warcraft	MMORPG	Blizzard Entertainment		PC, Mac	(Note: World of Warcraft:)
2005	Battlefield 2	First-person shooter	Digital Illusions CE	Electronic Arts	PC	(Note: Battlefield 2:)
2005	Call of Duty 2	First-person shooter	Infinity Ward	Activision	PC	(Note: Call of Duty 2:)
2005	Civilization IV	Turn-based strategy	Firaxis Games	2K	PC	(Note: Civilization IV:)
2005	Devil May Cry 3: Dante's Awakening	Action-adventure	Capcom Production Studio 1	Capcom	PS2	(Note: Devil May Cry 3: Dante's Awakening:)
2005	God of War	Action-adventure	Santa Monica Studio	Sony Computer Entertainment	PS2	(Note: God of War:)
2005	Guitar Hero	Rhythm	Harmonix	RedOctane	PS2	(Note: Guitar Hero:)
2005	Kingdom Hearts II	Action role-playing	Square Enix Product Development Division 1	Square Enix	PS2	(Note: Kingdom Hearts II:)
2005	Psychonauts	Platform	Double Fine Productions	Majesco	PC, Xbox	(Note: Psychonauts:)
2005	Resident Evil 4	Survival horror	Capcom Production Studio 4	Capcom	GameCube	(Note: Resident Evil 4:)
2005	Shadow of the Colossus	Action-adventure	Sony Computer Entertainment Japan	Sony Computer Entertainment	PS2	(Note: Shadow of the Colossus:)
2005	Tom Clancy's Splinter Cell: Chaos Theory	Stealth	Ubisoft Montreal, Ubisoft Milan	Ubisoft	GameCube, PC, PS2, Xbox	(Note: Tom Clancy's Splinter Cell: Chaos Theory:)
2006	Company of Heroes	Real-time strategy	Relic Entertainment	THQ	PC	(Note: Company of Heroes:)
2006	The Elder Scrolls IV: Oblivion	Action role-playing	Bethesda Game Studios	2K, Bethesda Softworks	PC, Xbox 360	(Note: The Elder Scrolls IV: Oblivion:)
2006	Gears of War	Third-person shooter	Epic Games	Microsoft Game Studios	Xbox 360	(Note: Gears of War:)
2006	Hitman: Blood Money	Stealth	IO Interactive	Eidos Interactive	PC, PS2, Xbox, Xbox 360	(Note: Hitman: Blood Money:)
2006	The Legend of Zelda: Twilight Princess	Action-adventure	Nintendo EAD	Nintendo	GameCube, Wii	(Note: The Legend of Zelda: Twilight Princess:)
2006	Ōkami	Action-adventure	Clover Studio	Capcom	PS2	(Note: Ōkami:)
2006	Virtua Fighter 5	Fighting	Sega AM2	Sega	Arcade	(Note: Virtua Fighter 5:)
2006	Wii Sports	Sports	Nintendo EAD	Nintendo	Wii	(Note: Wii Sports:)
2007	BioShock	First-person shooter	2K Boston, 2K Australia	2K	PC, Xbox 360	(Note: BioShock:)
2007	Call of Duty 4: Modern Warfare	First-person shooter	Infinity Ward	Activision	PC, PS3, Xbox 360	(Note: Call of Duty 4: Modern Warfare:)
2007	God of War II	Action-adventure	Santa Monica Studio	Sony Computer Entertainment	PS2	(Note: God of War II:)
2007	Halo 3	First-person shooter	Bungie	Microsoft Game Studios	Xbox 360	(Note: Halo 3:)
2007	Mass Effect	Action role-playing	BioWare	Microsoft Game Studios	Xbox 360	(Note: Mass Effect:)
2007	Pac-Man Championship Edition	Maze	Namco Bandai Games		Xbox 360	(Note: Pac-Man Championship Edition:)
2007	Peggle	Puzzle	PopCap Games		PC	(Note: Peggle:)
2007	Portal	Puzzle-platform	Valve Corporation		PC, Xbox 360	(Note: Portal:)
2007	Rock Band	Rhythm	Harmonix	MTV Games	PS3, Xbox 360	(Note: Rock Band:)
2007	Super Mario Galaxy	Platform	Nintendo EAD Tokyo	Nintendo	Wii	(Note: Super Mario Galaxy:)
2007	Team Fortress 2	First-person shooter	Valve Corporation		PC, Xbox 360	(Note: Team Fortress 2:)
2007	The World Ends with You	Action role-playing	Square Enix, Jupiter	Square Enix	Nintendo DS	(Note: The World Ends with You:)
2008	Braid	Puzzle-platform	Number None	Microsoft Game Studios	Xbox 360	(Note: Braid:)
2008	Burnout Paradise	Racing	Criterion Games	Electronic Arts	PC, PS3, Xbox 360	(Note: Burnout Paradise:)
2008	Dead Space	Survival horror	EA Redwood Shores	Electronic Arts	PC, PS3, Xbox 360	(Note: Dead Space:)
2008	Fable II	Action role-playing	Lionhead Studios	Microsoft Game Studios	Xbox 360	(Note: Fable II:)
2008	Fallout 3	Action role-playing	Bethesda Game Studios	Bethesda Softworks	PC, PS3, Xbox 360	(Note: Fallout 3:)
2008	Gears of War 2	Third-person shooter	Epic Games	Microsoft Game Studios	Xbox 360	(Note: Gears of War 2:)
2008	Grand Theft Auto IV	Action-adventure	Rockstar North	Rockstar Games	PS3, Xbox 360	(Note: Grand Theft Auto IV:)
2008	Left 4 Dead	First-person shooter	Valve South	Valve Corporation	PC, Xbox 360	(Note: Left 4 Dead:)
2008	LittleBigPlanet	Platform	Media Molecule	Sony Computer Entertainment	PS3	(Note: LittleBigPlanet:)
2008	Metal Gear Solid 4: Guns of the Patriots	Stealth	Kojima Productions	Konami	PS3	(Note: Metal Gear Solid 4: Guns of the Patriots:)
2008	Persona 4	Role-playing	Atlus		PS2	(Note: Persona 4:)
2008	Rock Band 2	Rhythm	Harmonix	MTV Games	Xbox 360	(Note: Rock Band 2:)
2008	Spelunky	Platform	Mossmouth		PC	(Note: Spelunky:)
2008	Street Fighter IV	Fighting	Capcom, Dimps	Capcom	Arcade	(Note: Street Fighter IV:)
2008	Super Smash Bros. Brawl	Fighting	Sora Ltd.	Nintendo	Wii	(Note: Super Smash Bros. Brawl:)
2008	Valkyria Chronicles	Tactical role-playing	Sega		PS3	(Note: Valkyria Chronicles:)
2009	Angry Birds	Puzzle	Rovio Entertainment		Maemo, iOS	(Note: Angry Birds:)
2009	Assassin's Creed II	Action-adventure	Ubisoft Montreal	Ubisoft	PS3, Xbox 360	(Note: Assassin's Creed II:)
2009	Batman: Arkham Asylum	Action-adventure	Rocksteady Studios	Eidos Interactive, Warner Bros.	PS3, Xbox 360	(Note: Batman: Arkham Asylum:)
2009	Bayonetta	Action-adventure	PlatinumGames	Sega	PS3, Xbox 360	(Note: Bayonetta:)
2009	Borderlands	Action role-playing	Gearbox Software	2K	PC, PS3, Xbox 360	(Note: Borderlands:)
2009	Demon's Souls	Action role-playing	FromSoftware	Sony Computer Entertainment	PS3	(Note: Demon's Souls:)
2009	Dragon Age: Origins	Role-playing	BioWare	Electronic Arts	PC, PS3, Xbox 360	(Note: Dragon Age: Origins:)
2009	League of Legends	MOBA	Riot Games		PC	(Note: League of Legends:)
2009	Left 4 Dead 2	First-person shooter	Valve Corporation		PC, Xbox 360	(Note: Left 4 Dead 2:)
2009	Plants vs. Zombies	Tower defense	PopCap Games		PC, Mac	(Note: Plants vs. Zombies:)
2009	The Sims 3	Life simulation	Maxis Redwood Shores	Electronic Arts	PC	(Note: The Sims 3:)
2009	Uncharted 2: Among Thieves	Action-adventure	Naughty Dog	Sony Computer Entertainment	PS3	(Note: Uncharted 2: Among Thieves:)
2010	Assassin's Creed: Brotherhood	Action-adventure	Ubisoft Montreal	Ubisoft	PS3, Xbox 360	(Note: Assassin's Creed: Brotherhood:)
2010	Civilization V	Turn-based strategy	Firaxis Games	2K	PC	(Note: Civilization V:)
2010	Fallout: New Vegas	Action role-playing	Obsidian Entertainment	Bethesda Softworks	PC, PS3, Xbox 360	(Note: Fallout: New Vegas:)
2010	God of War III	Action-adventure	Santa Monica Studio	Sony Computer Entertainment	PS3	(Note: God of War III:)
2010	Heavy Rain	Adventure	Quantic Dream	Sony Computer Entertainment	PS3	(Note: Heavy Rain:)
2010	Limbo	Puzzle-platform	Playdead	Microsoft Game Studios	Xbox 360	(Note: Limbo:)
2010	Mass Effect 2	Action role-playing	BioWare	Electronic Arts, Microsoft Game Studios	PC, Xbox 360	(Note: Mass Effect 2:)
2010	Red Dead Redemption	Action-adventure	Rockstar San Diego	Rockstar Games	PS3, Xbox 360	(Note: Red Dead Redemption:)
2010	Rock Band 3	Rhythm	Harmonix	MTV Games	Nintendo DS, PS3, Xbox 360, Wii	(Note: Rock Band 3:)
2010	StarCraft II: Wings of Liberty	Real-time strategy	Blizzard Entertainment		PC, Mac	(Note: StarCraft II: Wings of Liberty:)
2010	Super Mario Galaxy 2	Platform	Nintendo EAD Tokyo	Nintendo	Wii	(Note: Super Mario Galaxy 2:)
2010	Super Meat Boy	Platform	Team Meat		Xbox 360	(Note: Super Meat Boy:)
2010	Xenoblade Chronicles	Action role-playing	Monolith Soft	Nintendo	Wii	(Note: Xenoblade Chronicles:)
2011	Batman: Arkham City	Action-adventure	Rocksteady Studios	Warner Bros.	PS3, Xbox 360	(Note: Batman: Arkham City:)
2011	Dark Souls	Action role-playing	FromSoftware	Namco Bandai	PS3, Xbox 360	(Note: Dark Souls:)
2011	The Elder Scrolls V: Skyrim	Action role-playing	Bethesda Game Studios	Bethesda Softworks	PC, PS3, Xbox 360	(Note: The Elder Scrolls V: Skyrim:)
2011	Minecraft	Sandbox	Mojang Studios		PC, Mac, Linux	(Note: Minecraft:)
2011	Portal 2	Puzzle-platform	Valve Corporation		PC, PS3, Xbox 360	(Note: Portal 2:)
2012	Borderlands 2	Action role-playing	Gearbox Software	2K	PC, PS3, Xbox 360	(Note: Borderlands 2:)
2012	Dishonored	Stealth	Arkane Studios	Bethesda Softworks	PC, PS3, Xbox 360	(Note: Dishonored:)
2012	Far Cry 3	First-person shooter	Ubisoft Montreal	Ubisoft	PC, PS3, Xbox 360	(Note: Far Cry 3:)
2012	Fire Emblem Awakening	Tactical role-playing	Intelligent Systems	Nintendo	Nintendo 3DS	(Note: Fire Emblem Awakening:)
2012	Hotline Miami	Top-down shooter	Dennaton Games	Devolver Digital	PC	(Note: Hotline Miami:)
2012	Journey	Adventure	Thatgamecompany	Sony Computer Entertainment	PS3	(Note: Journey:)
2012	Mass Effect 3	Action role-playing	BioWare	Electronic Arts	PC, PS3, Xbox 360	(Note: Mass Effect 3:)
2012	The Walking Dead	Adventure	Telltale Games		PC, PS3, Xbox 360	(Note: The Walking Dead:)
2012	XCOM: Enemy Unknown	Turn-based strategy	Firaxis Games	2K	PC, PS3, Xbox 360	(Note: XCOM: Enemy Unknown:)
2013	Assassin's Creed IV: Black Flag	Action-adventure	Ubisoft Montreal	Ubisoft	PC, PS3, PS4, Wii U, Xbox 360, Xbox One	(Note: Assassin's Creed IV: Black Flag:)
2013	BioShock Infinite	First-person shooter	Irrational Games	2K	PC, PS3, Xbox 360	(Note: BioShock Infinite:)
2013	Dota 2	MOBA	Valve Corporation		PC	(Note: Dota 2:)
2013	Final Fantasy XIV: A Realm Reborn	MMORPG	Square Enix Business Division 5	Square Enix	PC, PS3	(Note: Final Fantasy XIV: A Realm Reborn:)
2013	Grand Theft Auto V	Action-adventure	Rockstar North	Rockstar Games	PS3, Xbox 360	(Note: Grand Theft Auto V:)
2013	The Last of Us	Action-adventure	Naughty Dog	Sony Computer Entertainment	PS3	(Note: The Last of Us:)
2013	Papers, Please	Puzzle	3909 LLC		PC, Mac	(Note: Papers, Please:)
2013	The Stanley Parable	Adventure	Galactic Cafe		PC	(Note: The Stanley Parable:)
2014	Alien: Isolation	Survival horror	Creative Assembly	Sega	PC, PS3, PS4, Xbox 360, Xbox One	(Note: Alien: Isolation:)
2014	Destiny	First-person shooter	Bungie	Activision	PS3, PS4, Xbox 360, Xbox One	(Note: Destiny:)
2014	Hearthstone	Digital collectible card	Blizzard Entertainment		PC, Mac	(Note: Hearthstone:)
2014	Mario Kart 8	Kart racing	Nintendo EAD	Nintendo	Wii U	(Note: Mario Kart 8:)
2014	Shovel Knight	Platform	Yacht Club Games		Nintendo 3DS, PC, Wii U	(Note: Shovel Knight:)
2015	Bloodborne	Action role-playing	FromSoftware	Sony Computer Entertainment	PS4	(Note: Bloodborne:)
2015	Life Is Strange	Adventure	Dontnod Entertainment	Square Enix	PC, PS3, PS4, Xbox 360, Xbox One	(Note: Life Is Strange:)
2015	Metal Gear Solid V: The Phantom Pain	Stealth	Kojima Productions	Konami	PC, PS3, PS4, Xbox 360, Xbox One	(Note: Metal Gear Solid V: The Phantom Pain:)
2015	Rocket League	Sports	Psyonix		PC, PS4	(Note: Rocket League:)
2015	Undertale	Role-playing	Toby Fox		PC, Mac	(Note: Undertale:)
2015	The Witcher 3: Wild Hunt	Action role-playing	CD Projekt Red	CD Projekt	PC, PS4, Xbox One	(Note: The Witcher 3: Wild Hunt:)
2016	Dishonored 2	Stealth	Arkane Lyon	Bethesda Softworks	PC, PS4, Xbox One	(Note: Dishonored 2:)
2016	Inside	Puzzle-platform	Playdead		Xbox One, PC	(Note: Inside:)
2016	Overwatch	First-person shooter	Blizzard Entertainment		PC, PS4, Xbox One	(Note: Overwatch:)
2016	Persona 5	Role-playing	P-Studio	Atlus	PS3, PS4	(Note: Persona 5:)
2016	Stardew Valley	Farm life simulation	ConcernedApe	Chucklefish	PC	(Note: Stardew Valley:)
2016	Titanfall 2	First-person shooter	Respawn Entertainment	Electronic Arts	PC, PS4, Xbox One	(Note: Titanfall 2:)
2016	Uncharted 4: A Thief's End	Action-adventure	Naughty Dog	Sony Computer Entertainment	PS4	(Note: Uncharted 4: A Thief's End:)
2016	The Witness	Puzzle	Thekla, Inc.		PC, PS4	(Note: The Witness:)
2017	Divinity: Original Sin II	Role-playing	Larian Studios		PC	(Note: Divinity: Original Sin II:)
2017	Fortnite	Third-person shooter	Epic Games		PC, Mac, PS4, Xbox One	(Note: Fortnite:)
2017	Hollow Knight	Action-adventure	Team Cherry		PC	(Note: Hollow Knight:)
2017	Nier: Automata	Action role-playing	PlatinumGames	Square Enix	PS4	(Note: Nier: Automata:)
2017	The Legend of Zelda: Breath of the Wild	Action-adventure	Nintendo EPD	Nintendo	Nintendo Switch, Wii U	(Note: The Legend of Zelda: Breath of the Wild:)
2017	Super Mario Odyssey	Platform	Nintendo EPD	Nintendo	Nintendo Switch	(Note: Super Mario Odyssey:)
2018	Celeste	Platform	Maddy Makes Games		Linux, Mac, Nintendo Switch, PC, PS4	(Note: Celeste:)
2018	God of War	Action-adventure	Santa Monica Studio	Sony Interactive Entertainment	PS4	(Note: God of War:)
2018	Red Dead Redemption 2	Action-adventure	Rockstar Games		PS4, Xbox One	(Note: Red Dead Redemption 2:)
2018	Return of the Obra Dinn	Adventure	Lucas Pope	3909 LLC.	Mac, PC	(Note: Return of the Obra Dinn:)
2018	Super Smash Bros. Ultimate	Fighting	Bandai Namco Studios, Sora Ltd	Nintendo	Nintendo Switch	(Note: Super Smash Bros. Ultimate:)
2019	Disco Elysium	Role-playing	ZA/UM		PC	(Note: Disco Elysium:)
2019	Outer Wilds	Action-adventure	Mobius Digital	Annapurna Interactive	PC, Xbox One	(Note: Outer Wilds:)
2020	Animal Crossing: New Horizons	Life simulation	Nintendo EPD	Nintendo	Nintendo Switch	(Note: Animal Crossing: New Horizons:)
2020	Hades	Roguelike	Supergiant Games		PC, Mac, Nintendo Switch	(Note: Hades:)
2020	The Last of Us Part II	Action-adventure	Naughty Dog	Sony Interactive Entertainment	PS4	(Note: The Last of Us Part II:)
2022	Elden Ring	Action role-playing	FromSoftware	Bandai Namco	PC, PS4, PS5, Xbox One, Xbox Series X/S	(Note: Elden Ring:)
2023	Baldur's Gate 3	Role-playing	Larian Studios		PC	(Note: Baldur's Gate III:)

== Publications ==
The reference numbers in the notes section show which of the 61 selected publications list the game.

- 1001 Video Games You Must Play Before You Die – 2013
- The Age – 2005
- Collider – 2020
- Digital Trends – 2023
- Digitally Downloaded – 2016
- Electric Playground Network – 2013
- Edge – 2000, 2009, 2015, 2017
- Electronic Fun with Computers & Games – 1984
- Empire – 2009
- Entertainment Weekly – 2003
- Esquire – 2018, 2019, 2020
- FHM – 2010
- Flux – 1995
- FZ – 2025
- G4 – 2012
- GamesMaster – 1994, 1996
- Gamecenter – 2000
- Game Informer – 2009, 2018
- Game On! From Pong to Oblivion – 2006
- GameSpot – 2000, 2007
- GameSpy – 2001
- Gamereactor – 2011, 2017, 2022
- GamesRadar+ – 2011, 2012, 2013, 2014, 2015, 2021
- GamesTM – 2010, 2015, 2018
- Gameswelt – 2012, 2016
- GamingBolt – 2013, 2022, 2023, 2024, 2025
- Giant Bomb - 2026
- GQ – 2013, 2023
- The Greatest Games – 1985
- Hardcore Gaming 101 – 2015, 2020
- Hyper – 1995, 1997, 1999, 2013, 2018
- IGN – 2003, 2005, 2007, 2015, 2018, 2019, 2021
- The Independent – 1999, 2025
- The Irish Times – 2013, 2026
- Jeuxvideo.com – 2011, 2017
- Jeux Video Network / Jeux Video Magazine – 2009, 2012
- Kinda Funny – 2026
- Kinopoisk – 2023
- Mashable – 2020
- Moustique – 2024
- Multiplayer.it – 2025
- Next Generation – 1996, 1999
- Parade – 2023
- Polygon – 2017
- Popular Mechanics – 2014, 2019
- Power Unlimited – 2015
- PPE – 2021
- Rolling Stone – 2025
- Screen Rant – 2024
- Slant Magazine – 2014, 2018, 2020
- Stuff – 2008, 2014, 2017
- Super GamePower – 2001
- Sydney Morning Herald – 2002
- Terebi Gēmu: Denshi Yūgi Taizen – 1988
- The Times – 2023
- Time – 2012, 2016
- Total Games Network – 1999
- USA Today / Sports Illustrated – 2022, 2023, 2024
- Video Gamer – 2020
- TheWrap – 2017
- Yahoo! – 2005

== See also ==
Video games

- List of best-selling video games
- List of Game of the Year awards
- List of video game soundtracks considered the best
- List of mobile games listed among the best
- List of video games notable for negative reception
- Video games as an art form

Other art forms

- List of anime series considered the best
- List of films voted the best
- List of television shows listed among the best

== Notes ==
The reference numbers show which publications include the game.
