= Computer Science Undergraduate Association =

ASUC-funded group at University of California, Berkeley

- Founded: 1972; 54 years ago
- Founded at: University of California, Berkeley
- Type: Social Club
- Location: Berkeley, California, United States
- Members: 5,000
- Website: www.csua.berkeley.edu

The Computer Science Association (UC Berkeley CSUA, or CSUA) is an ASUC funded group at University of California, Berkeley, first founded in 1972. The CSUA's constitution reads:

The purposes of this organization are: to represent the computer science student body in dealings with the University of California at Berkeley, its representatives, and any other appropriate organization; to provide a forum for the personal interaction of persons involved in the computer sciences; to promote knowledge of and interest in the computer sciences; and to raise funds to accomplish these goals.

The CSUA is an all-volunteer, student-run, student-initiated service group established to support the computer science body of the University of California, Berkeley. The CSUA Office is located in 311 Soda Hall in front of the 3rd floor entrance to Soda Hall, at the corner of Hearst & LeRoy. It also maintains a study lounge at 341 Soda Hall. The CSUA provides computing resources, support, and community to the Berkeley campus community, hosting tech talks, hackathons, info sessions, CS workshops, LAN parties, and the biannual Startup Fair.

== History ==
The CSUA was first ASUC sponsored in the 1972–1973 academic year.

The CSUA shares a great deal of history with the EXperimental Computing Facility (XCF).

The CSUA was instrumental for the creation of Cowsay. In the words of author Tony Monroe,

Cows have been a big part of the history and culture of the Computer Science University Association at the University of California at Berkeley. The cows traditionally seen there before I joined the organization were very limited in what they could say and do. I wrote cowsay in an effort to remove some of those limitations.

The CSUA used to be located in Evans Hall, before moving into Soda Hall shortly after Soda's construction. It occupied 343 Soda, then moved to 311 Soda.

The CSUA's main RAID failed sometime before Fall of 2016, causing the loss of decades of historical user data.

== Organizational structure ==
As of 2020, the CSUA consists of three groups, in order of ascending responsibilities: members, officers, and members of the Politburo.

The CSUA is led by a seven-member "Politburo," which has executive power over the organization. The positions are as follows:

The organization shall have seven elected offices, named President, Vice President of Technology, Vice President of Industry Relations, Secretary/Treasurer, External Events Coordinator, Internal Events Coordinator, and Outreach Chair.

The CSUA has a base of officers who have access to the office and serve the community as part of their duties. Regular officers have less responsibilities than the Politburo officers, and are elected into the organization as officers by a unanimous vote of the Politburo.

CSUA members gain membership by creating a CSUA account. This account grants access to CSUA's computing resources. Members also are able to vote at General Meeting #3.

== Notable alumni ==
- Brian Behlendorf
- Jonathan Blow
- Chris Demetriou, co-founder NetBSD
- Adam Glass, co-founder NetBSD
- Gene Kan
- Lila Tretikov, former director of the Wikimedia Foundation
- Tony Monroe, author of Cowsay
- Sameer Parekh

== Services ==
- Webhosting
- Linux shell access
- Computer lab
- Hackathons
- Info Sessions
- CS Workshops
- LAN parties
- Email forwarding
