= Braid (video game) =

2008 puzzle platform video game

- Artwork created by David Hellman for advertising Braid. The broken hourglass and collapsing sandcastle represent some unique game concepts.
- Developer: Number None (Note: Anniversary Edition developed by Thekla, Inc.)
- Publisher: Number None (Note: Microsoft Game Studios published the Xbox 360 version. Anniversary Edition published by Thekla, Inc.)
- Designer: Jonathan Blow
- Artist: David Hellman
- Composers: Jami Sieber; Shira Kammen; Cheryl Ann Fulton
- Platforms: Original; Xbox 360; Microsoft Windows; Mac OS X; Linux; PlayStation 3; Anniversary Edition; Microsoft Windows; macOS; Linux; PlayStation 4; PlayStation 5; Nintendo Switch; Nintendo Switch 2; Xbox One; Xbox Series X/S; Android; iOS
- Release: August 6, 2008: Xbox 360; WW: August 6, 2008 Microsoft Windows; WW: April 10, 2009 Mac OS X; WW: May 20, 2009 PlayStation 3; NA: November 12, 2009; PAL: December 17, 2009 Linux; WW: December 14, 2010 Anniversary Edition; WW: May 14, 2024 Nintendo Switch 2; WW: February 14, 2026
- Genre: Puzzle-platform
- Mode: Single-player

Braid is an indie puzzle-platform video game developed by Number None. The game was originally released in August 2008 for the Xbox 360's Xbox Live Arcade service. Ports were developed and released for Microsoft Windows in April 2009, Mac OS X in May 2009, PlayStation 3 in November 2009, and Linux in December 2010. Jonathan Blow designed the game as a personal critique of contemporary trends in video game development. He self-funded the three-year project, working with webcomic artist David Hellman to develop the artwork.

The basic story elements in Braid unfold as the protagonist, Tim, attempts to rescue a princess from a monster. Text passages laid throughout the game reveal a multifaceted narrative, giving clues about Tim's contemplations and motivations. The game features traditionally defining aspects of the platform genre while also integrating various novel powers of time-manipulation. Using these abilities, the player progresses through the game by finding and assembling jigsaw puzzle pieces.

A preliminary version of Braid (without the final artwork) won the "Innovation in Game Design" award at the 2006 Independent Games Festival, while the final version received additional accolades. The game received critical acclaim and praise for its mechanics, puzzles, graphics, and soundtrack. While some criticized the game's price relative to its length of play, it eventually became the highest rated title on Xbox Live, and is considered to be one of the greatest video games ever made. It is seen as a keystone title in the growth of indie game development, and Blow and its production were documented in the 2012 film, Indie Game: The Movie. The game had total revenue nearing $6 million, as of 2015, which Blow used to fund his next game, The Witness, a 3D puzzle game released in 2016.

A remastered version of the game titled Braid, Anniversary Edition, featuring new levels, commentary, overhauled visuals and remixed sound was released in May 2024 for Android, iOS, Nintendo Switch, PlayStation 4, PlayStation 5, Windows, Xbox One, and Xbox Series X/S, and for Nintendo Switch 2 in February 2026.

== Gameplay ==
Braid is played by solving physical puzzles in a standard platform game environment. The player controls the protagonist Tim as he runs, jumps, and climbs across the game's levels. Tim jumps and stomps on enemies to defeat them, and can collect keys to unlock doors or operate levers to trigger platforms. A defining game element is the player's unlimited ability to reverse time and "rewind" actions, even after dying. The game is divided into six worlds, which are experienced sequentially and can be entered from different rooms of Tim's house; the player can return to any world previously visited to attempt to solve puzzles they missed.

Each world has its own time-based game mechanic:

- 2. Time and Forgiveness plays as an ordinary platform game, except that the player may rewind time to undo their actions. The section includes several challenges that would be unplayable or unfair in an ordinary platform game, but become feasible when the rewind mechanic is available.
- 3. Time and Mystery introduces objects surrounded by a green glow that are unaffected by time manipulation; for example, switches will remain flipped even if time is rewound to before the action occurred. Rewinding can thus be used to change the synchronization between objects that can and cannot be rewound, the basis of many puzzles in this section. This theme is also used in later worlds to denote objects unaffected by the player's time manipulation.
- 4. Time and Place links the passage of time to the player character's location on the horizontal axis. As the player moves toward the right, time flows forward, while moving toward the left reverses the flow; standing still or moving vertically will pause time. The player's location must be carefully managed in relation to enemies and objects.
- 5. Time and Decision involves a "shadow" of the player character appearing after the player rewinds time and performing the actions that the real player character rewound; if the timeline expires, the shadow will complete any initiated falls and jumps but will otherwise stand still before disappearing. Things coloured in violet can interact both with the main character and his shadow at the same time. Puzzles in this section revolve around using this mechanic to carry out multiple actions at once.
- 6. Hesitance provides the player with a magic ring which, when dropped, warps the flow of time around itself; the closer moving objects (including Tim) are to it, the slower time passes for them. The regular rewind control remains available.
- The final world is labeled simply "1." In this world, time flows in reverse. Rewinding time returns the flow of time to its normal state.

Each stage contains puzzle pieces that must be collected to create jigsaw puzzles that tell the story, and to unlock the last stage. On completing the main game, a speedrun mode becomes available for select levels and the entire game. There are also eight stars hidden throughout the world of Braid that correspond to the stars in the constellation of Andromeda just outside the main character's house.

== Plot ==
Tim is a man searching for a princess who "has been snatched by a horrible and evil monster." His relationship with this princess is vague, but made a mistake which he hopes to reconcile or erase. As one progresses through the six worlds in Braid, storyline text at the beginning of each world provides further insight into Tim's quest for the princess, and alludes to the overarching gameplay mechanic of each level. The themes evoked include forgiveness, desire, and frustration. The final level, in which everything but Tim moves in reverse, depicts the princess escaping from a knight, and working together with Tim to surpass obstacles and meet at her home. Tim is suddenly locked out of the house, and, as time progresses forward, reversing Tim's actions, the events show the princess running from Tim, setting traps that he is able to evade, until she is rescued by the knight. Tim is revealed to be the "monster" from whom the princess is running. Following completion of the game, the player finds additional texts that expand the story.

== Development ==
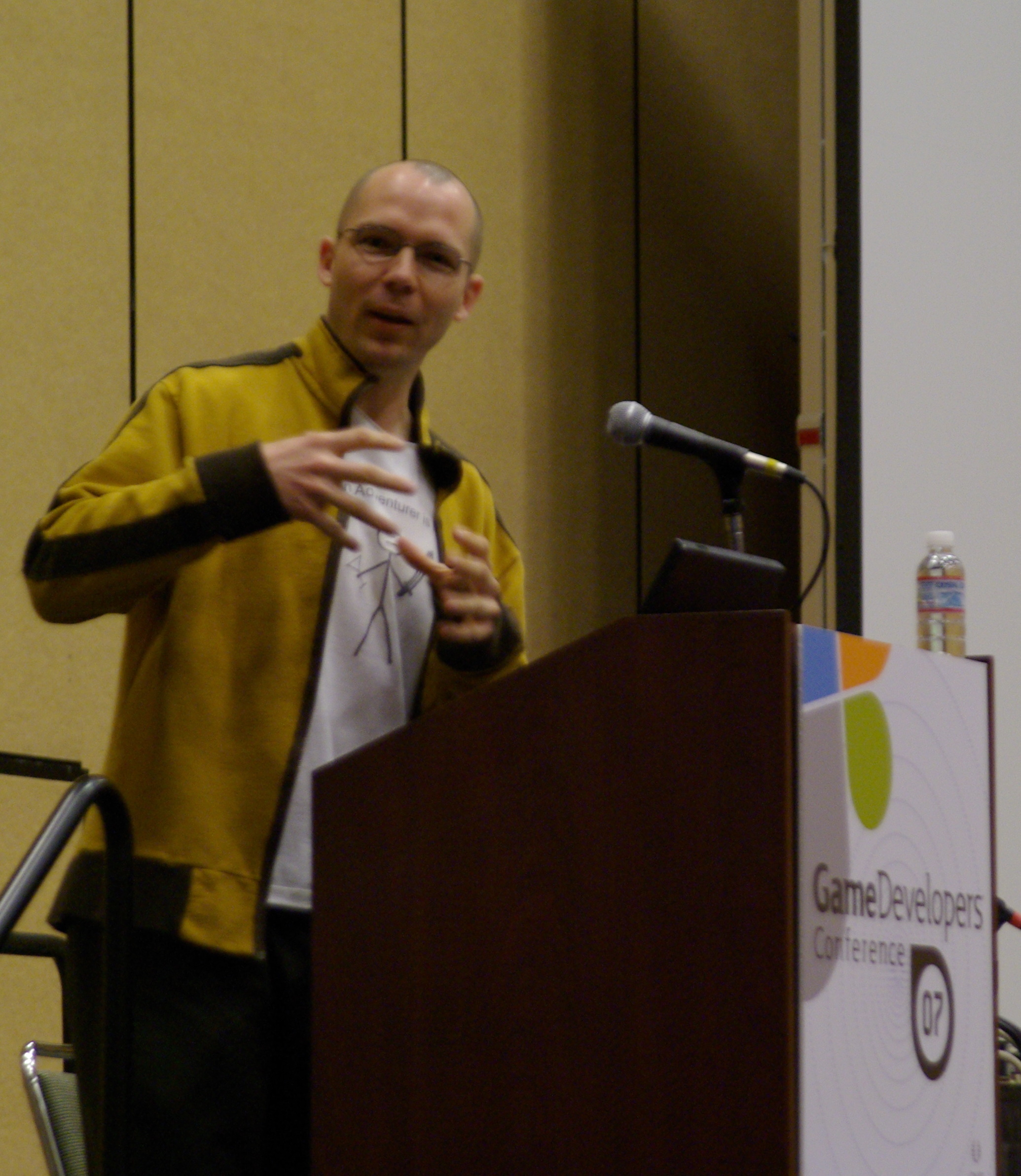
Jonathan Blow, the creator of Braid, in 2007

Jonathan Blow created Braid as a game that deconstructed current video games trends, "bringing together the abstract parts of a complex puzzle, revealing deep moral and philosophical questions". Blow came up with the concept of Braid in December 2004 while on a trip to Thailand, and started development work on it in April the following year. By December 2005, a version of the game was completed that had the same number of worlds and puzzles as the final version, but lacked the final artwork; this version won the Independent Games Festival game design award at the 2006 Game Developer's Conference. While working on the art direction, Blow tightened the presentation and mechanics of the puzzles to improve their playability. During the game's three years of development, Blow put about US$200,000 of his own money into its development, most going towards hiring David Hellman for artwork and for living expenses.

Originally, Blow had envisioned the game to be broken into several different worlds as in the final game, each exploring facets of space, time, and causality, but with each world having very different high-level mechanics. One mechanic that he could not develop further was a world with no "arrow of time" that would have required the player to traverse the level in a manner that could be repeated in reverse. For example, the player would have been forbidden to jump down from a tall height while moving in forward time, as they would not be able to jump that height in reverse time. While this idea was not used, Blow discovered the rewind feature could be developed further for other aspects. Another game mechanic that Blow considered was to show the player the expected result of an action they would take; while this concept was informative, he did not find it to be an entertaining game mechanic. Blow had previously explored this in a prototype game called "Oracle Billiards", the game predicting each billiards shot before it was made. He had found the billiards setting too chaotic for this idea and this led him to try out similar ideas in a simpler "Mario-style" setting. After selecting the game mechanics he wanted, he began adding puzzles that made philosophical points on his views on game design in general. After brainstorming more puzzles and concepts, Blow dropped the least interesting puzzles and worlds from the game. Blow wanted to include significant consequences of rewinding time, not found in games such as Prince of Persia: The Sands of Time, Blinx: the Time Sweeper, and TimeShift in which rewinding time creates few or no changes to the game's world. While these games immerse the player with these time-shifting effects using a first- or third-person perspective, he decided to use a 2D presentation. Blow noted that some of the puzzles in Braid would have been more difficult or impossible to solve in any other perspective.

One of Blow's design goals was to achieve gameplay innovation naturally through the artistic expression of the game. He used Rod Humble's The Marriage as an example, in which Humble set out to make a game that related his feelings of being in a marriage, instead of developing game concepts first and adding the story later. As such, Blow noted that while there were no new gameplay mechanics, the gameplay felt different from any other game. Another concept that he used for Braid's development related to the game's presentation to the player. Blow recognized that many games present a complex interface to the player that get in the way of understanding the game, but at times are needed to explain the game's rules to draw in players. Blow referenced Jeff Minter's Space Giraffe, pointing out that the game never communicated the purpose of playing the game upfront to the player, citing that as one of the reasons for the game's poor reception. Braid was developed to promote this non-verbal communication to the player, explaining the fundamental rule of each world at its start and allow the player to interact with that rule throughout the world. Commenting during the development of his following game, The Witness, Blow noted that he would run into difficulty in demonstrating Braid through video footage alone, as it would not show "what happens in the player's mind during the puzzle-solving process", a problem that he had also encountered with The Witness.

Blow recognized that the puzzles in Braid had a range of difficulties, with some puzzles being more difficult for certain players than others, and did not have any set difficulty curve. He designed most of the game's levels to let the player bypass the puzzles, allowing them to experience the rest of the game even if they could not solve a difficult puzzle. Only certain boss fights require the player to defeat the enemy character before continuing on, using a combination of the time mechanics. Blow hoped that players would be able to find solutions to puzzles they had skipped by completing puzzles later in the game. Blow felt that "unearned rewards are false and meaningless", and thus included collectibles earned only after solving a puzzle. He strongly discouraged players from using a walkthrough to work their way through Braid, instead encouraging players to solve them on their own so that they "will feel very good about" completing the puzzles without help; Blow created his own official "walkthrough" that initially appears to guide the player, but then instead restates his insistence that the player work through the puzzles on their own. Some puzzles pay homage to other video games; one level features a Donkey Kong-inspired puzzle, and the ending of most worlds tells the player that "the princess is in another castle", similar to the end of each world in Super Mario Bros.

The game's story was influenced by such works as Italo Calvino's Invisible Cities, Alan Lightman's Einstein's Dreams, Robert A. Heinlein's The Cat Who Walks Through Walls, and David Lynch's Mulholland Drive. Specifically, while Blow took the unique narrative model of Invisible Cities, he did not like the homage to it in Einstein's Dreams, and thus avoided taking the story in that direction. Blow's goal was that Braid would "be mind-expanding" and that "people [would] get experiences from it that they [had] not gotten from anything else". Blow opted to present his story through on-screen text instead of in-game cutscenes, asserting, against criticism of the lack of such cut-scenes, that Braid was "conceived as a videogame with its story presented in the tradition of a few books that I respect".

The ending of the game is purposely ambiguous, and has been subject to multiple interpretations. One theory, based on the inclusion of a hidden event and the famous quotation stated by Kenneth Bainbridge after the detonation of the first atomic bomb—"Now we are all sons of bitches"—is that the princess represents the atomic bomb and Tim is a scientist involved in its development. Some also refer to the name of the game as both reference to the hair braid of the princess Tim seeks as well as the intertwining of time, demonstrated by the various time mechanics explored in the game. Journalists have considered Braid's plot to be interwoven with the game itself, much as the book Dictionary of the Khazars and the films Memento and Eternal Sunshine of the Spotless Mind interweave the narrative into the work's construction. In this sense, some have considered the game to carry a simple credo, such as "You must look back to go forwards" as suggested by Eurogamer's Dan Whitehead. Others have likened Braid to punk rock, designed (as explicitly stated by Blow) specifically as a statement against the status quo of the industry; it is considered to deconstruct traditional gameplay concepts, such as jumping on enemies or rescuing a princess from a castle as borrowed from Super Mario Bros., and rebuild them in the game to force the player to rethink current game design. Blow has stated that there is more than one interpretation of the story; he "would not be capable" of explaining the whole story of the game in words, and said that the central idea is "something big and subtle and resists being looked at directly." Blow considered Braid to be "about the journey, not the destination". He deliberately designed the plot not to be fully revealed to the player unless they completed the game, seeing it as a way to provide "a longer-term challenge".

=== Artwork ===
Blow provided simple drawings of what he envisioned the levels to look like in Braid (top). Hellman created the necessary pieces of artwork to match the drawings as well as the mood and tone of each level; the image here was used for World 3, Time and Mystery.

The game's artwork took more than a year to complete. Background artwork for the game went through initial rough color concepts created by Mike Corriero (creative illustrator and concept artist) and ultimately the final artwork was created by David Hellman, artist of the critically acclaimed webcomic A Lesson Is Learned but the Damage Is Irreversible. Blow gave Hellman rough images of the level's layout and told him to draw over it. Hellman and Blow iterated through several styles before settling on final versions. Through these changes, the two worked to identify and remove elements of the art that could confuse the player, while retaining aesthetic elements that would be generalized by the player as non-functional parts of the level. Once the game's overall artwork was created, Blow and Hellman broke out functional pieces that could be used in Braid's level editor. As each world was built up using these pieces, Blow suggested more changes that reflected the tone of each world and avoided art that distracted from the gameplay. "Time and Forgiveness", the first world the player encounters, was drawn to create a feel of exploration and forgiveness, while artwork for "Time and Decision" used a mix of "luxurious domestic objects (nice furniture and fabrics) with rugged outdoor objects (swampy water, rotting piers and nautical rope)" to create an intentionally "incongruous" look to convey aspects of alternate realities. Several variations on the game's backgrounds were done until they arrived at the concept of blurring the background elements to make them appear out of focus, while keeping the foreground elements sharply in focus and clear to the player. Particle effects were applied to both background and foreground elements to add apparent motion to them, such as the waving of grass blades or the movement of clouds. The character visuals were originally created by Edmund McMillen, but were later redrawn by Hellman "to better match the now-predominant style of the backgrounds".

=== Music ===
Braid features licensed music from Magnatune artists Cheryl Ann Fulton, Shira Kammen and Jami Sieber. Part of Blow's decision to use licensed music was to reduce development costs. He also felt that those who regularly compose video game music did not have the necessary skills needed to create the mood he wanted for the game. He ultimately selected eight tracks that were sufficiently long to avoid notable looping while a player attempted to solve a difficult puzzle, and that provided a "different and interesting" sound when played in reverse to match the reverse time mechanic of the gameplay. Blow also selected tracks that were "organic and complex" as to help set the game's mood and aimed "to present something that isn't necessarily clear-cut". The selection of the music influenced the creation of the background artwork for the game. Both Kammen and Sieber received favorable feedback from listeners as a result of their works' inclusion in Braid. Magnatune released a soundtrack of the game's music on April 9, 2009, which includes two additional track remixes that incorporate some of the time-shifting elements from the game. The pieces included in Braid are:

- "Maenam" by Jami Sieber, from Hidden Sky
- "Undercurrent" by Jami Sieber, from Lush Mechanique
- "The Darkening Ground" by Jami Sieber, from Lush Mechanique
- "Tell It by Heart" by Jami Sieber, from Second Sight
- "Long Past Gone" by Jami Sieber, from Second Sight
- "Downstream" by Shira Kammen, from Music of Waters (The entire track is actually composed of three pieces of music. The first is "Downstream" itself, composed by Kammen, the second is "O Son do Ar", composed by Luar Na Lubre, and the third is Eric Montbel's "Borrèia d'Aragon")
- "Lullaby Set" by Shira Kammen and Swan, from Wild Wood
- "Romanesca" by Cheryl Ann Fulton, from The Once and Future Harp

== Release ==
Prior to release, Blow withdrew Braid from the 2007 Slamdance Guerrilla Games Competition in protest after the controversial Super Columbine Massacre RPG! was dropped from the competition despite being one of six finalists. Several other developers followed suit and later withdrew their games, including thatgamecompany's flOw and The Behemoth's Castle Crashers.

Braid was originally developed as a Windows title with possible console versions, though Blow was not committed to releasing either a PC or console version first. Blow signed up with Microsoft to release the game on Xbox Live in mid-2007, with that version officially announced at the 2007 Tokyo Game Show. Blow was critical of the Xbox Live certification process, as he believed the effort to meet all the requirements could have been better spent on polishing the game. At the same time, the certification team allowed him to retain certain aspects of his vision for the game that were otherwise contrary to the process, including giving the player immediate control of the game instead of requiring a start-up title screen. Microsoft also requested that Blow include some additional hints to the player based on results of playtesting, but Blow held his ground, refusing to release the game if he was forced to add these. He said he would likely not release a game again on the Xbox Live service under the same business model. Blow later released a Braid theme for Xbox Live; though he wanted to release this theme for free, Microsoft required the theme to be priced at a nominal level.

The Windows version was originally slated for a late 2008 release; but as Blow decided to prevent Braid being overwhelmed by a number of large titles that were scheduled for release in late 2008 it was pushed to early 2009. The PC version benefited from the work by Blow to create Braid on a standardized platform like the Xbox 360 in order to finish the core game before dealing with various compatibility issues inherent in PC development. Prior to the game's release for Microsoft Windows, Blow had priced the game at US$20, using pricing models for other games such as World of Goo and Crayon Physics Deluxe. However, this was priced $5 more than the Xbox Live version, leading many to criticize his pricing choice. Due to this response, Blow reduced the price to meet the Xbox Live cost, stating that he would "rather have people talking about the game itself" than complaining about its cost. Hothead Games ported Braid to both the PlayStation 3 and Macintosh platforms. A Linux port was done by Ryan C. Gordon and released in December 2010 as part of the second Humble Indie Bundle alongside the Windows and Mac version. It was further added as a bonus to the Humble Indie Bundle V. Blow said that a WiiWare version would not be possible under Nintendo's current size restrictions.

Shortly after the game's release, Blow expressed that he had no plans to release more levels or make a sequel; however, he added that "if another developer out there really likes the time mechanics and wants to make a game that uses them, and perhaps some new ones, with their own new level designs, then hey, awesome." Shortly after the PC release, Blow released resources for a level editor for Braid that allow users to import new graphics into the game. Since then, several mods containing new puzzles and story content have been released.

=== Anniversary edition ===
In August 2020, Braid, Anniversary Edition, a remastered edition of Braid, was announced during Sony's State of Play event. The game's art was repainted with significantly more detail, with smoother animations and enhanced sound. The new edition includes detailed and thorough developer commentary from Blow. The commentary also includes interviews, and some of this commentary was released online as the podcast Braid, Anniversary Edition Podcast. Players are able to toggle between the original and upgraded version while playing. Blow said that the remaster would be faithful to the original and not get a "Greedo shoots first" treatment. The remaster would include 40 new levels. The game launched May 14, 2024, for the Nintendo Switch, PlayStation 4 and 5, Windows, Xbox One and Xbox Series X/S, Android, and iOS. The mobile versions were released by Netflix and require an active subscription. They were delisted on July 14, 2025. A Nintendo Switch 2 Edition was released on February 14, 2026.

== Reception ==
Reception

Aggregate score
Aggregator	Score
Metacritic	X360: 93/100; PC: 90/100; PS3: 93/100

Review scores
Publication	Score
1Up.com	X360: A+
Destructoid	9.7/10
Edge	X360: 9/10
Eurogamer	X360: 10/10
GameSpot	X360: 9.5/10
Giant Bomb	5/5
IGN	X360: 8.8/10; PC: 8.8/10
PlayStation Official Magazine – UK	10/10
Official Xbox Magazine (US)	X360: 9/10
TeamXbox	X360: 9.1/10

Upon its release to Xbox Live Arcade, Braid received critical acclaim, with an aggregate review score of 93/100 at Metacritic, making it the top-rated Xbox Live Arcade and the 10th highest-rated Xbox 360 game. Braid was purchased by more than 55,000 people during the first week of release. According to Blow, Braid was the second-largest selling Xbox Live Arcade title in 2008 and sales were "very profitable", making him more money than if he had been working at a high-paying job for the time it took to develop the game. The game had sold 450,000 copies by April 2012. By 2014, Blow had stated that sales of Braid brought in more than $4 million in revenue, much of which he used towards the development of his 2016 game, The Witness.

Braid has been considered a masterpiece, and was highly praised for the unique puzzles it presented. Dan Whitehead of Eurogamer noted the creative variation on time manipulation and the need to understand the non-linearity of his actions made him feel as if "years of gaming blinders have been ripped away." Jason Hill of The Age stated the puzzles were "elaborate and formidable", but "impeccably designed and hugely satisfying to solve", a point reiterated by Sunday Herald Sun's Paddy Reiley. The connection between the puzzles and the overall presentation of the game was favorably received; Tom McShea of GameSpot stated that Braid was "the rare game that will make you rack your brain trying to solve puzzles one minute while challenging you to come to terms with its mature tale the next". Sam Roberts, game director for the Slamdance Film Festival Guerrilla Gamemaking Competition, was impressed that Braid did not "feel immature" as it "expects [as] much" of the player as any other form of media and "doesn't short you in any respect". Braid's artwork and presentation were given high regards. Nick Suttner of 1UP.com commented that Braid's artwork "juxtapose old-school design sensibilities with impressionist backdrops and lovingly hand-painted environments", while McShea stated that the game's visuals were "eye-catching but never distracting". Wired's Jean Snow wrote that Braid's "beautiful symphonic melodies contribute to what is already an impressive and unique vision", and that "the soothing tunes are probably the reason you never really lose it when facing particularly tough puzzles". Arthouse Games' Jason Rohrer interpreted the ability to rewind time indefinitely as a commentary about traditional platform game design: the fact the player is not forced to restart the level when they die gives greater emphasis to the game's "core challenges".

The game was primarily criticized for its short length. IGN's Hilary Goldstein stated that the game offers "no reason to come back" once all the puzzles have been completed. However, others compared Braid's short experience to similar criticisms with Portal in that its length "can be disregarded in the face of its unique approach to storytelling and expansive ideas". The game's price was also seen as a negative for the game, though McShea wrote that "Braid is worth every penny". Blow later said that he expected the price to be US$10, but Microsoft, in promoting the game as part of its Summer of Arcade, made the price $15. The game has also been described as aimless. Despite otherwise positive commentary, DeAndre Cortez Way noted that there seemed to be "no point to the game." Edge also noted that while Blow had tried to integrate the story and gameplay throughout the game, this only worked well in the final world, and otherwise the story was "a little trite in its self-conscious obscurity". However, others — including new media academics — have disagreed, praising the philosophical complexity of the game, with John Finlay Kerr writing "Jonathan Blow's Braid is the sort of ontological labyrinth that Jorge Luis Borges might have made. Embedded in the simple gameplay design are genuinely huge concepts."

The PC version of the game was considered to be "faithful" to the Xbox 360 version of the game, retaining the same content without adding any new features. Reviewers commented that Braid benefited from keyboard controls. However, as a port of the Xbox 360 version, the lack of initial support for optimizing the graphics display for one's computer, either through larger screen resolutions or turning off certain game effects, was seen as a drawback. Both the PlayStation 3 and Macintosh ports of the game by Hothead Games were found to be easily accessible on the system and retained all the innovation and challenge of the original Xbox Live game.

Anniversary Edition did not receive much media attention or advertising. Jonathan Blow said in a livestream that Anniversary Edition "sold like dogshit" and that Thekla couldn't afford to pay any of its employees after its sales missed expectations by so much.

=== Awards ===
In addition to winning the Independent Games Festival award in 2006 during its design, Braid was selected by GameSpot for their 2008 awards in "Best Original Downloadable Console Game", "Best Platformer", and "Best Licensed Music", and by Official Xbox Magazine for their 2008 awards of "Xbox Live Arcade Game of the Year", "Best Soundtrack", and "Best Ending" and one of their "Indisputably Incredible Runners-ups to Game of the Year". Braid was awarded with "Casual Game of the Year" (along with a nomination for "Outstanding Innovation in Gaming") at the 12th Annual Interactive Achievement Awards. Braid was nominated for five Xbox Live Arcade 2008 awards, winning one award in the category of "Best Innovation". MacWorld included Braid in its 2009 Game Hall of Fame. IGN named Braid the 8th best Xbox Live Arcade game in a September 2010 listing, and the 25th best PlayStation 3 game in a September 2013 listing.

== Legacy ==
Developers have cited Braid as an influence on their game design. Japanese video game developer Goichi "Suda51" Suda, developer of killer7 and No More Heroes, stated that playing Braid made him want to try making a 2D title. Tim can be unlocked as a playable character in Super Meat Boy, a game designed by independent game developer Edmund McMillen who had previously created Gish and the original character designs for Braid. Braid has also garnered academic interest and acclaim for its complexity, with narratologists saying "Anyone who thinks... the unique constraints of game play cannot possibly be used to best structure a story has probably not encountered Braid, which marries pure mechanics and story into a philosophical platform." Braid's use of narrative elements and puzzle-making has been compared to similar techniques of "imperative storytelling" in novels such as Life: A User's Manual and Through the Looking-Glass.

Braid is considered the definitive title that launched wide interest in independently developed video games starting around 2008 and onward. The Guardian considered the game as the "Sex, Lies, and Videotape of indie gaming, a potent symbol for the saleable potential of non-mainstream productions". Joshuah Bearman for The New York Times called Braid the "Easy Rider moment", showcasing how a small developer can be as successful as a large one. Indie game studios Playdead, Supergiant Games, and Amanita Design stated that Braid was not unique as it was released on newly created digital distribution services alongside other successful indie titles like Castle Crashers, World of Goo, and Super Meat Boy. However, they continued, Braid's financial success without aid of a publisher showed that small teams could achieve mainstream success, paving the way for many future indie games developed out in a similar manner. Others saw Braid's legacy in its art form; Sam Machkovech for Ars Technica compared the game to The Beach Boys' Pet Sounds, a transformative work in the genre that used familiar elements in a new manner. Braid, along with Jonathan Blow's insight on the game, was featured in Indie Game: The Movie.
