= EXperimental Computing Facility =

Founded in 1986, the eXperimental Computing Facility (XCF) is an undergraduate computing-interest organization at University of California, Berkeley. The "Experimental" description was given in contrast to the Open Computing Facility and the Computer Science Undergraduate Association, which support most of the general-interest computing desires of the campus. As such, the XCF stands as a focus for a small group of computer-scientists uniquely interested in computer science.

Members of the organization have been involved in projects such as NNTP, GTK, GIMP, Gnutella, and Viola. Members of the XCF were instrumental in defending against the Morris Internet worm.

== Notable alumni ==
Notable alumni of the organization include: Jonathan Blow, Gene Kan, Spencer Kimball, Peter Mattis, Pei-Yuan Wei, and Phil Lapsley.
