= Phil Lapsley =

American engineer, hacker, author and entrepreneur (born 1965)

Philip D. Lapsley (born 1965) is an American electrical engineer, hacker, author, and entrepreneur.

== Early life ==
Lapsley attended the University of California, Berkeley, in the 1980s, graduating with a B.S. and M.S. in electrical engineering and computer science in 1988 and 1991. While there, he became involved in the Berkeley UNIX project and co-founded the eXperimental Computing Facility, where he was involved in defending against the Morris worm in 1988.

Lapsley received an M.B.A. from the MIT Sloan School of Management.

== Career ==
Lapsley co-authored RFC 977, Network News Transfer Protocol (NNTP), an Internet standard for transmission of USENET news articles, and was the primary developer of the NNTP reference implementation, nntpd. After leaving, Berkeley he co-founded Berkeley Design Technology, Inc., a digital signal processing technology advisory firm, and is the author of a book on DSP processors. He later co-founded SmartTouch, a biometric financial transaction processing company.

Lapsley worked at McKinsey & Company as a management consultant until 2008.

His book Exploding the Phone, on the history of phone phreaking, was published by Grove/Atlantic in February, 2013.
