= Jonathan Blow =

American game designer and programmer

- Blow in 2018
- Born: November 1971 (age 54–55); California, U.S.
- Education: University of California, Berkeley (dropped out)
- Occupations: Game designer; programmer
- Organization(s): Thekla, Inc.
- Known for: Braid; The Witness; Jai programming language

Jonathan David Blow (born 1971) is an American video game designer and programmer. He is best known for his work on the independent video games Braid (2008) and The Witness (2016). Blow became interested in game programming while at middle school. He studied computer science and English at the University of California, Berkeley, but dropped out to start a game company. After the company closed following the dot-com crash, Blow worked as a game development contractor. He co-founded the Experimental Gameplay Workshop and wrote a monthly technical column for Game Developer magazine.

Blow gained prominence in 2008 with Braid. He used its financial success to fund his next game, The Witness, and formed a company called Thekla Inc. After a lengthy development period, The Witness was released in 2016, and like Braid was critically and financially successful. During its development, Blow became frustrated with C++, the programming language Thekla used to create the game. He began designing and creating a new programming language. Full-time work on the language, code-named Jai, and a new game implemented in it began after the release of The Witness. A compiler for the Jai language is currently in beta release.

Blow's games are known for being artistic and challenging. They are made with custom game engines, and have larger budgets and longer development times than most independently funded games. Blow was featured in Indie Game: The Movie, and is known for his strong opinions about the gaming industry. Since the 2020s, Blow has come under criticism based on his political opinions.

== Early life ==
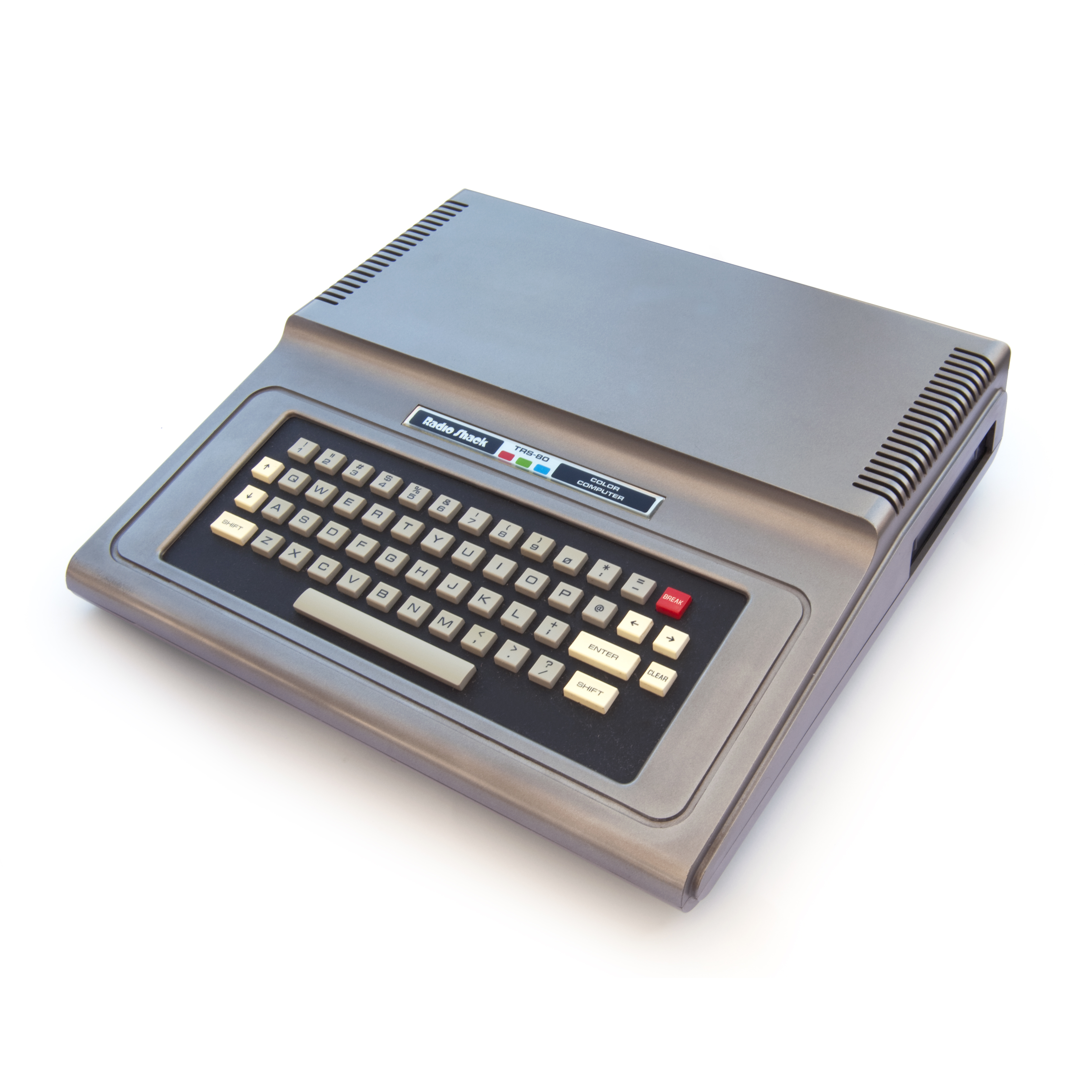
Blow learned how to program in BASIC on a TRS-80 Color Computer during his childhood.

Jonathan Blow was born in Southern California in 1971. His father worked as a defense contractor for TRW, and his mother was an ex-nun. He is the fourth of five siblings, having two brothers and two sisters. Blow was raised as a Christian and said his family regularly attended church. Blow went to middle school in Northern San Diego County. While there, he attended a fifth-or-sixth-grade computer class where the VIC-20 home computer provided him with his introduction to programming and computers. When his parents noticed his interest, they bought him a TRS-80 Color Computer, on which Blow learned to program in BASIC, often using exercise books from RadioShack. In high school, he programmed games on a Commodore 64. Some of the games he programmed were inspired by Indiana Jones and Pac-Man.

In 1989, Blow attended UC Berkeley as an undergraduate, double-majoring in computer science and English. He started as a physics major but switched to computer science because he "just felt called in that direction". He was a member and president of the Computer Science Undergraduate Association, as well as the eXperimental Computing Facility, an undergraduate computer-interest organization. During college, Blow wrote some science fiction, which he published under a pseudonym. He spent five years at UC Berkeley but dropped out with less than one semester to go. He said; "I was really depressed about being at school, I didn't like it. I didn't have a good time."

== Career ==
=== 1994–2000: Career beginnings and Wulfram ===
After leaving UC Berkeley, Blow worked at a "really boring" enterprise software company for six months, before taking a contracting role at Silicon Graphics, where he ported Doom and Doom II to a set-top box. In early 1996, Blow co-founded the game company Bolt-Action Software, which was based in Oakland, California, with Bernt Habermeier, whom Blow had met in the eXperimental Computing Facility. An artist later joined the company, and they created Wulfram, a 3D action-strategy game for up to 32 players where players took control of heavily armed hovertanks.

At its height, Bolt-Action Software had 14 employees. It folded in 2000 due to the dot-com crash. In a 2020 interview, Blow said he was convinced 1996 was the most difficult time in history to start a video game company because of the transition from 2D to 3D titles. A number of components of the game were challenging to implement, but Blow learned from the experience—he said; "we went broke, and I was burned out for several years after that from working hard ... but that's how I became a good programmer".

=== 2001–2004: contracting work ===
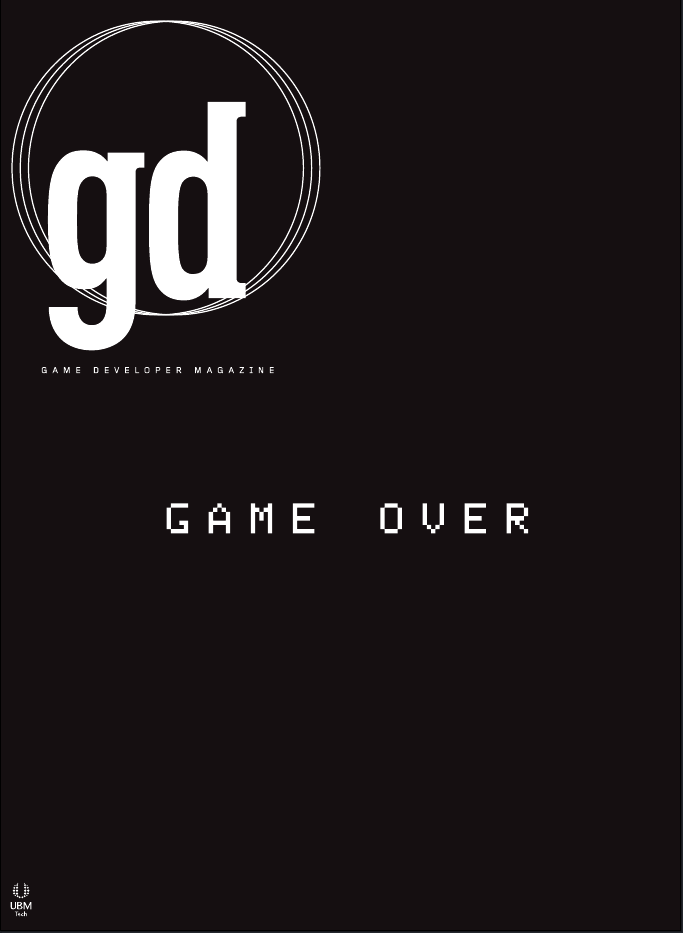
Throughout the early 2000s Blow wrote a monthly technical column for the print magazine Game Developer.

After Blow closed his first studio, he worked as a contractor for game studios with large budgets. Games he worked on include Oddworld: Munch's Oddysee, Deus Ex: Invisible War and Thief: Deadly Shadows. In 2002, Blow co-founded the Experimental Gameplay Workshop at the Game Developers Conference, which showcases game prototypes that include new mechanics or that are new video game genres or mediums. Around this time, he wrote The Inner Product, a monthly technical column for magazine Game Developer.

During this time, Blow moved to New York City, where he was introduced to an IBM research project about servers based on cell processors. Blow pitched them a proof of concept of a physics-intensive, online, multiplayer game about giant robots attacking a town. Blow and Atman Binstock did most of the programming for the game; Blow wrote the client-side code, graphics, and gameplay, while Binstock wrote the physics engine to run on the server from scratch. After submitting their final report to IBM, the team took the game to Electronic Arts, who Blow said were not impressed.

Blow's other contract work included particle effect programming on Flow on the Sony PlayStation 3; code review following MTV's purchase of Harmonix; and programming on the music-action iPod game Phase. Blow said of this part of his life; "I was just stumbling forward like people do sometimes, and doing the best that I knew how to do, which at that time was programming".

=== 2005–2008: Braid ===
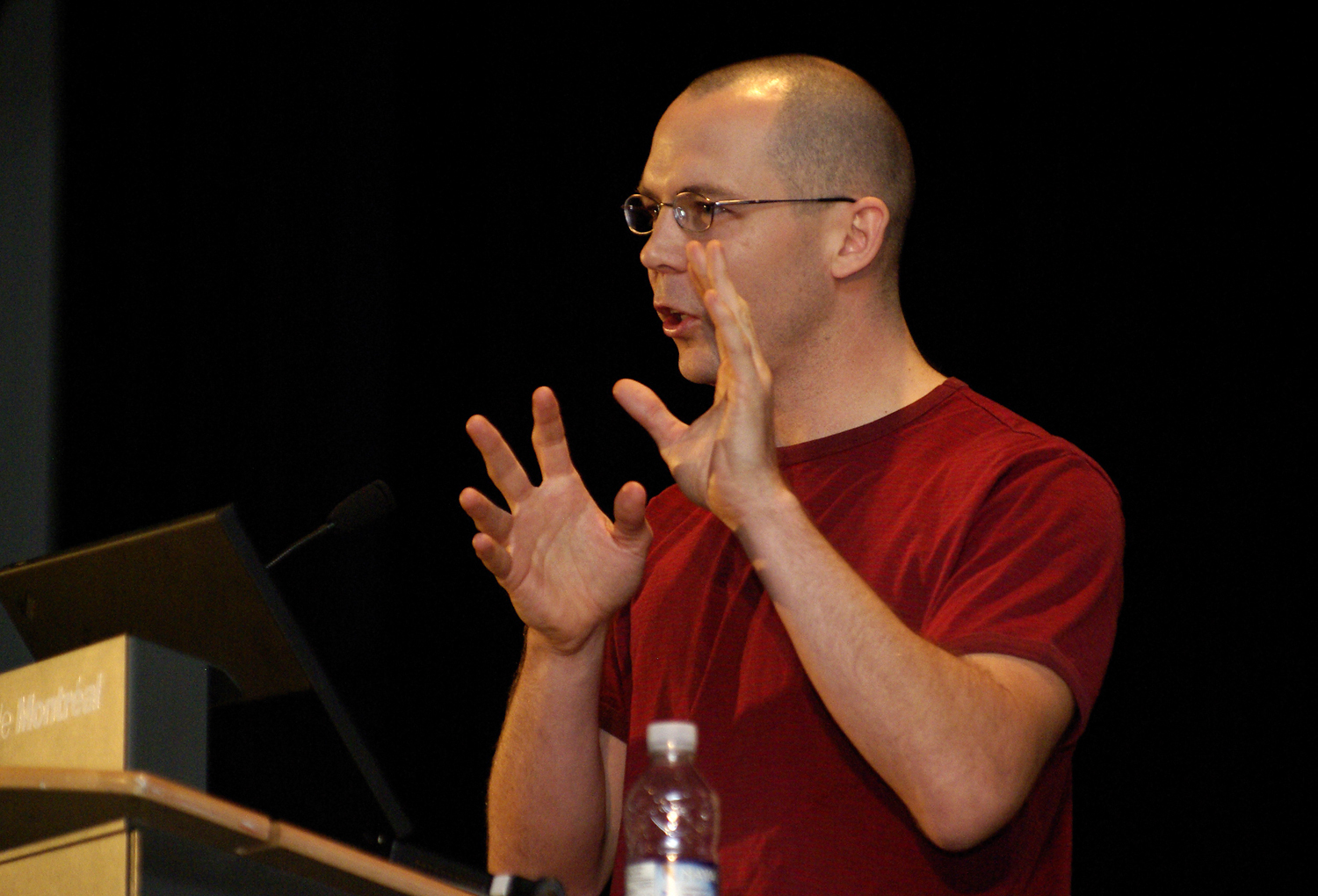
Blow talked about assumptions underlying game design at the Montreal International Games Summit in 2007.

Blow created a prototype for a 2D puzzle-platform game involving time manipulation in December 2004. Five months later, he began work on turning the prototype into a proper game, and by December 2005 the first version of what would be known as Braid was completed. Much of the work was done part-time because Blow also did consulting work and martial arts training. Blow felt the graphics and art style of the first version of the game "looked extremely amateur", and hired David Hellman to create all of the game's art. For the story, Blow drew inspiration from some of his favorite books and films such as Invisible Cities and Mulholland Drive. The game's narrative is told through textual exposition between worlds, environmental art, and gameplay, and has been interpreted in many different ways.

In mid-2007, Blow signed with Microsoft to release Braid via its distribution platform XBLA. Blow felt time spent meeting the XBLA certification process would have been better spent polishing the game, but he noted Microsoft was "very hands-off" with game design, and that "the final game is exactly what I wanted to put there". Blow estimated he spent more than $180,000 of his own money to develop Braid. Braid was released in August 2008 to universal acclaim, was "an immediate sensation", and made Blow a millionaire. Braid was one of the earliest indie games to grace seventh-generation consoles.

In 2010, Blow co-founded funding organization Indie Fund together with some other successful independent game developers. Blow appeared in the documentary film Indie Game: The Movie, in which he discusses his experiences developing and releasing Braid. In 2014 Blow stated sales of Braid had earned more than $4 million, which he used to fund The Witness (2016).

=== 2009–2016: The Witness ===
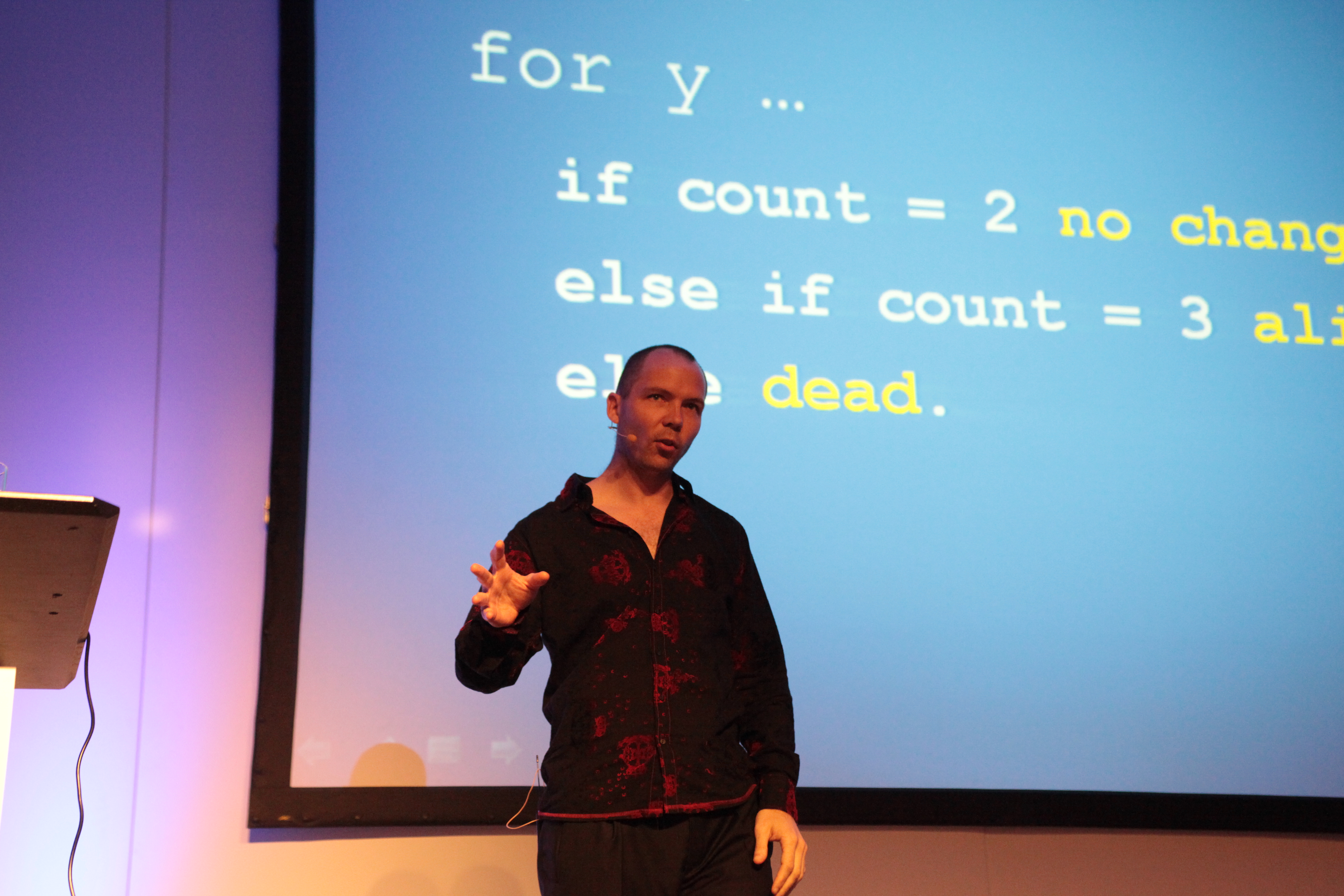
Blow talked about truth in game design at the Game Developers Conference in Europe in 2011.

Blow's next project was The Witness (2016), a first-person game in which players solve puzzles by drawing paths. Blow wanted to create a game using non-verbal communication; the puzzle rules are never explained with words but the puzzles themselves teach the player the rules. Blow felt solving puzzles in this way could generate epiphanies for players, and tried to design the game so the player experiences "miniature epiphanies over and over again". Blow estimated solving every puzzle in the game would take more than 80 hours.

Work on The Witness began in 2008. Blow created prototypes of several game ideas before choosing the one he liked the most, despite it being a 3D game which he "absolutely didn't want to do". Throughout development, Blow hired developers full-time and founded the company Thekla, Inc., of which he is president. The Witness was revealed to the public in 2010, when three people were working full-time on the game. Blow hoped to release The Witness in 2013 as a launch title for the Sony PlayStation 4, but the goal passed as the scope of the game increased. By 2015, the core team had grown to eight. At the time, it was very rare for a small, independent game studio to spend more than seven years on a game.

The game was released on Windows and the PlayStation 4 in January 2016. Blow reported that the first week sales revenue of The Witness totaled over US$5 million, and was one of the top downloads on illegal BitTorrent websites. The game received critical acclaim, several BAFTA and Game Developers Choice Awards nominations, and appeared on 'Best of the decade' features from IGN, Polygon, NME, CNET, and National Post.

=== 2017–present: Jai programming language, Order of the Sinking Star, and Braid, Anniversary Edition ===
Towards the end of development of The Witness, Blow became frustrated with C++, the programming language Thekla used to create the game. Blow considered the language to be over-complex, noting; "C++ is a powerful language in some ways ... but it makes [software development] a lot harder than it should be". In September 2014, Blow delivered a talk on his Twitch channel about the possibility of a new programming language designed for game development. He evaluated alternative programming languages such as Go and Rust, but ultimately expressed the desire to create a new language. Blow estimated a new programming language designed for game development could reduce typical development time by at least 20% and make programming more enjoyable. He also said the language would be relatively easy to create compared to creating a game like The Witness.

In 2014, Blow began designing the language, which is codenamed Jai, and started creating a compiler for it. The first year and a half of work on Jai was part-time because Thekla was shipping The Witness. In mid-2016, he began full-time work on the language, a game engine written in Jai, and Order of the Sinking Star. In 2023, Blow described the game as "the biggest single-player puzzle game that anybody's ever made", and estimated that it will take 250 hours to complete at a "normal pace", and more than 500 hours for completionists.

Among other things, Blow hopes the language will improve the experience of game programming and allow programmers to build more functionality with less code. By working on the Order of the Sinking Star, its engine, and Jai at the same time, Blow is able to test the language's design and adjust it early in its lifetime. As of August 2023, the Jai compiler is in a beta release.

In August 2020, Thekla announced Braid, Anniversary Edition, a remastered edition of Braid. Blow said the remaster will be faithful to the original, saying Braid will not get any "Greedo shoots first" changes. The game was to include more than 15 hours of developer's commentary. Thekla originally planned to launch the game in early 2021, but it was pushed back, and eventually released on May 14, 2024 for multiple platforms. Blow was frustrated with the weak reception to the launch, saying Anniversary Edition "sold like dogshit" and that Thekla could not afford to pay any of its employees to work on the Jai compiler.

=== Long-term project ===
In 2013, Blow began making a prototype for a single-player game that was not a puzzle game. In 2018, Blow said the game had 40–50 hours of playable content. He intends for Thekla to make the game using the game engine being developed for Order of the Sinking Star, once it has matured. He plans to work on the game for 20 years, releasing it in installments. Each installment will make the game larger and more complex. Blow noted one of his goals for the project is to expand his design abilities.

== Artistry ==
In his youth, Blow liked playing text adventure games by Infocom; his favorite was Trinity, which Blow said "affected me in a relatively deep way in terms of the way that I think about games". In college, his favorite game was Netrek. Early in his career Blow frequently played Counter-Strike.

Blow's games are known for being artistic, challenging, and not following industry trends. In a retrospective on Braid, GQ noted the game was released at a time when the market was dominated by violent and repetitive first-person shooters, yet "made an earnest effort to make an artistic statement" that went beyond this trend. The puzzles of Braid have been described as "tough" and "formidable". Time described The Witness as "categorically defiant", and described its reception as being "widely quantified as a game created by a genius for geniuses".

Blow's games have higher budgets and longer development times than most independently funded games, and have custom game engines. Braid was built with a relatively large budget for independent games at the time, while The Witness—which was largely funded with the profits of Braid—cost close to six million dollars. The development times for Braid and The Witness were very rare for independent games at the time. Blow created a custom game engine for both games, which in the case of The Witness took a large amount of development time. He noted that when development of The Witness began, off-the-shelf engines such as Unity and Unreal Engine were not sufficiently capable to build the game. Blow also noted that he tries to make games that stand the test of time, so owning his own engine means he can continue to provide the game to people in contrast to off-the-shelf engines that come with no such guarantee. (Note: For example, if the company that made an engine goes out of business, the engine may no longer be supported.) Braid artist David Hellman said Blow was not stressed about time or budget, and that for him "the game always came first."

Blow said when he makes a game, he tries to make something he would want to play and be interested in. He wants to understand the world from many perspectives, and tries to uncover and understand truths about the universe through game design. Blow enjoys exploring the permutations of a simple idea. He described an ideal player of his games as someone who "is inquisitive and likes to be treated as an intelligent person". Blow hopes the design skills he developed by working on complicated games have made Jai better designed than most languages.

Blow founded Thekla because he wanted creative freedom rather than out of aspiration to run a company. He used almost all of the profits of Braid to independently fund The Witness, noting that by doing so he had total creative freedom and thereby would not have to adjust the game to please the whims of a publisher. The team that worked on The Witness said Blow gave them a lot of autonomy when working on the game. Blow does not schedule development time for games at Thekla, noting; "we don't do it like Electronic Arts. We don't pick a quarter and ship the game. We're just trying to make the best game."

== Public image ==
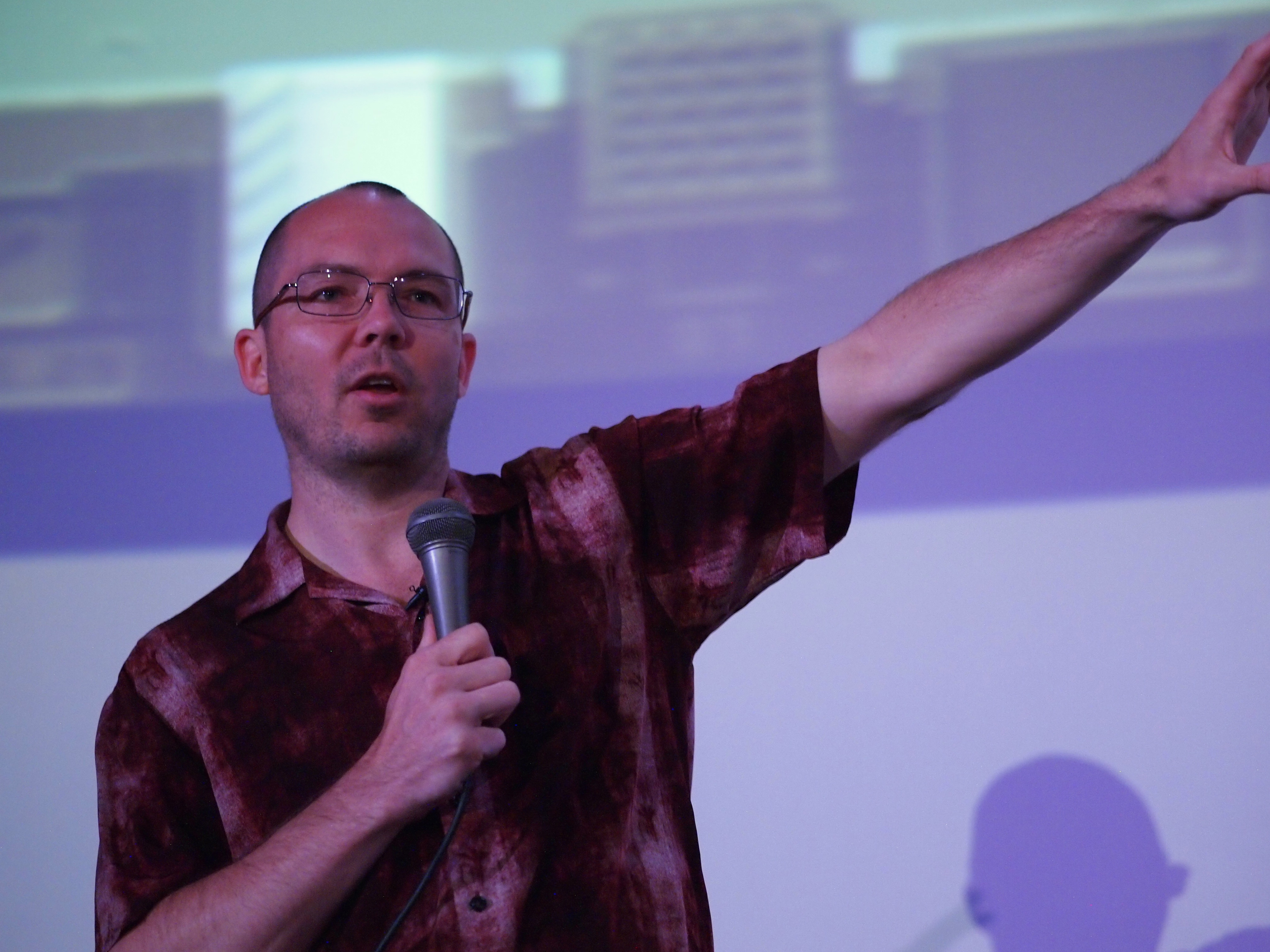
Blow discussed the similarities between free-to-play games and bad television at a CreativeMornings meetup in Portland in 2013.

Blow has been characterized by VentureBeat as having a "reputation for doing outstanding work", and is known for voicing his opinions about the gaming industry. He has been described as a "prickly genius", and as the game industry's "most cerebral developer, but also as its most incisive and polarizing internal critic". Commenting on his criticism, Blow said "I honestly say what I think about games, and I honestly say if I think something is good or not, and why". Stephen Totilo of Kotaku said Blow's criticism is not targeted towards individuals or specific games but general game design and industry trends.

Blow thinks there are individual elements of storytelling that work well in games, including mood, character and setting; but considers games to be a terrible medium for storytelling in general. As of 2016, he considered the quality of storytelling in games to be significantly lower than that in literature. In 2018, he said many contemporary games include designs that are self-sabotaging and weaken the structure of the game they are in, despite such designs existing nearly a decade earlier, indicating stalled progress in the medium. (Note: For example, a game may ask a player to make a decision based on a list of possible outcomes with their probabilities, but it is possible for the game to use a different set of probabilities when selecting an outcome. Blow considers designs that do this to be self-sabotaging, and said that games that did this belong in "the most central, deepest, most frozen circle of hell.") He does not consider microtransactions to be inherently unethical, but thinks many games made for phones are "just pretending to be games in order to have a microtransaction button or show ads". He considers social network games evil, and noted while SimCity and FarmVille appear superficially similar, SimCity is a creative activity that involves problem solving while FarmVille is about retaining the player's attention for as long as possible.

According to Blow, games have the potential to have a much bigger role culturally and help define the human condition. While Blow strives to make his games meaningful, he has noted games with relatively empty gameplay, such as massively multiplayer online games (MMOs) which keep players hooked with fake rewards, may be causing real harm to people.

Despite being seen as a role model for independent development, Blow is uncomfortable with being described as an indie developer: he feels the indie game scene has changed into something in which he does not belong. In 2019, he said the independent development scene had changed in that it was easier to make and release a game than ever before, but that in terms of game-design "progress has not been as large as people assume". Blow noted Stephen's Sausage Roll, a game he thought in 2017 "may be the best puzzle of all time", was rarely discussed in development circles, indicating a stagnation of the development scene. The comments attracted social-media attention, which Blow found troubling, noting; "The job isn't to be in a community; the job is to make a good game."

Blow considers much of current software to be of low quality. He noted in a 2020 interview "I think we're now in a situation where everybody in the world is flooded with low quality software, and everybody wishes that they had higher quality software." He considers most of what programmers currently do to be wasteful, describing programming in 2021 as dealing with unnecessary complexity. He has a low opinion of modern C++, describing it in 2020 as a terrible language, and was partly motivated to create Jai in order to improve the quality of life for programmers.

In December of 2025, game developer Alan Hazelden, who licensed two of his own games for use in Order of the Sinking Star, made a statement against Blow regarding his political views, citing Blow's support for Donald Trump, negative views on diversity, equity and inclusion, and opinions on COVID-19 vaccinations. Two other developers from the same project, Sean Barrett and Jonah Ostroff, also echoed the statements made by Hazelden on social media.

== Personal life ==
Blow has been described as being "intensely private". Blow began kung fu training when he began working on Braid, doing 15 hours a week towards the end of development. Through the training he learned meditation practices that helped him with game development, noting "I don't know if I would have finished Braid if I wasn't doing kung fu." He practiced tai chi during early development of The Witness. Blow is an avid dancer, and went out dancing several nights a week during the development of The Witness. He discovered that dancing helps him generate ideas, and during the 1990s took a notebook to clubs to write down programming ideas that would come to him on the dance floor.

Blow is active on the social media platform X (formerly Twitter), YouTube, and streaming service Twitch. His online activity includes both commentary about game development and expressing personal political opinions, including anti-vaccine rhetoric, support for the presidency of Donald Trump, and criticism of diversity, equity and inclusion programs, which has drawn criticism from other game developers.

== Works ==
=== Video games ===
Only games where Blow has had a major role in development are included below. For example, works in which he is credited under Special Thanks are omitted.

Year	Title	Role	Ref.
1998 (Note: The game was released in an open beta on TEN in July 1998.)	Wulfram	Design, programming	
2001	Oddworld: Munch's Oddysee	Programming	
2003	Deus Ex: Invisible War	Additional programming	
2006	Flow	Additional programming	
2007	Phase	Programming	
2008	Braid	Director, programming, design, writing	
2016	The Witness	Director, programming, design	
2024	Braid, Anniversary Edition	Director, programming, design, writing, voice	
2026	Order of the Sinking Star	Director, programming, design	

=== Films ===
Year	Title	Role	Notes	Ref.
2012	Indie Game: The Movie	Himself	Documentary	
