= The Witness (2016 video game) =

Puzzle video game

- Developers: Thekla, Inc. (Note: Nvidia Lightspeed Studios developed the Nvidia Shield version.)
- Publishers: Thekla, Inc.
- Director: Jonathan Blow
- Producer: Jonathan Blow
- Designer: Jonathan Blow
- Programmers: Jonathan Blow; Ignacio Castaño; Salvador Bel Murciano; Andrew Smith
- Artists: Luis Antonio; Orsolya Spanyol; Eric A. Anderson
- Writers: Goeun Lee; Jonathan Blow
- Platforms: PlayStation 4; Windows; Xbox One; Nvidia Shield; macOS; iOS
- Release: January 26, 2016: PlayStation 4, Windows; January 26, 2016; Xbox One; September 13, 2016; Nvidia Shield; January 16, 2017; macOS; March 8, 2017; iOS; September 20, 2017
- Genre: Puzzle
- Mode: Single-player

The Witness is a 2016 puzzle video game developed and published by Thekla, Inc. (Note: pronounced /ˈtɛklɑː/) Inspired by Myst, the game involves the exploration of an open world island filled with natural and human-made structures. The player progresses by solving puzzles, which are based on interactions with grids presented on panels around the island or paths hidden within the environment.

Announced in 2009, The Witness had a lengthy development period. Jonathan Blow, the game's lead designer, started work on the title in 2008, shortly after releasing Braid. The financial success of Braid allowed him to hire a larger production team without ceding creative control over the final product. To create the game's visual language, the team developed their own game engine and retained artists, architects, and landscape architects to design the structures on the island. Blow desired to create a game around non-verbal communication, given no direct instructions for solving puzzles are provided, wanting players to learn from observation and to come to epiphanies in finding solutions and leading to a greater sense of involvement and comprehension with each success. The game includes around 650 puzzles, though the player is not required to solve them all to finish the game.

Original plans for release in 2013 on the PlayStation 3 and Xbox 360 were abandoned as the game engine became more demanding, and the team ultimately opted for an initial release on Windows and PlayStation 4 in January 2016, with later versions released for the Xbox One, Nvidia Shield, macOS, and iOS. The Witness received generally favorable reviews from critics, who praised the art, setting, and difficult but surmountable puzzles. Over 100,000 copies were sold within a week of release, which was about as many copies as Braid had done within a year of its release, recouping nearly all development costs.

== Gameplay ==
The Witness is a first-person puzzle video game. The player, as an unnamed character, emerges from an underground bunker and explores an island with numerous structures and natural formations. The island is roughly divided into eleven regions, arranged around a mountain that represents the ultimate goal for the player. The regions are differentiated from one another by changes in vegetation, and the puzzles within each region are similar to one another (e.g. their solutions may all involve symmetry). Throughout the island are yellow boxes housing turrets. These can be activated once the puzzles within the box's region have been solved. When activated, the turrets emerge to shine a light toward the top of the mountain, indicating that a section is complete. Several such turrets need to be activated to unlock access to the inside of the mountain and ultimately reach the final goal. Additional puzzles can be discovered if all eleven turrets are activated. Once the player finishes the ending puzzle, they are carried through the air by a cage and returned to the bunker where the game began.

There are additional optional puzzles scattered around the island. One such set of puzzles, accessible after entering the mountain and colloquially referred to as "The Challenge", is a time-based test to complete about a dozen algorithmically generated puzzles of various types within seven minutes. The sequence is set to music from Edvard Grieg's "Anitra's Dance" and "In the Hall of the Mountain King". The game has more than 650 puzzles, which Jonathan Blow estimates will take the average player about 80 hours to solve. The puzzles include one that Blow believed that less than 1% of the players would be able to solve.

A puzzle in The Witness, in which the player must separate fields with white from those with black dots while tracing a single path through the maze. This puzzle is part of a sequence of puzzles (seen on the left and right) that teach this mechanic to the player.

Mechanically, all puzzles in The Witness are solved in the same way: a path is drawn on a grid. For a path to be a solution to a puzzle, it must satisfy a number of rules. The rules are usually simple. For example, in a grid with white and black squares, a path may be required to separate the different kinds of squares, as illustrated to the left. The rules are taught to the player throughout the course of the game by the puzzles themselves, as such, there is no text or dialogue directly explaining a puzzle's rules. While the rules a path must satisfy can differ substantially across the game, at least three rules apply to all puzzles: paths must always begin from a round node, end on a line segment with a rounded end, and avoid self-intersection. As such, many of the puzzles can be classified as mazes.

The game has two modes of interaction. The first, a walking mode, allows the player to move around and explore the island. The second, the path-drawing mode, is the one the player uses to attempt to solve puzzles. This mode is distinguished from the former by a white border around the screen. In path-drawing mode, the player's avatar is prevented from moving and instead allows the player to use their controls to trace the path through the puzzle's grid. The mode ends once the player solves the puzzle or cancels the mode. Normally, this mode is activated in front of a panel, moving the player's view directly to the panel to solve it, but it can also be activated at any other time. Nearly all puzzles provide immediate feedback if they have been solved correctly or not through sound effects or visual indication.

Most puzzles are easy to identify, located on recognizable eye-level panels scattered around the island. Sometimes several panels will be clustered together, as is typically done when the game is teaching a rule to the player. Most panels are daisy-chained to one another with power cables; solving one will light-up the cable, and unlock another panel. When this occurs in one of the game's regions, the complexity of the puzzles increases as the player works towards unlocking the region's yellow box (the size of the grids may increase, the region's rules may be refined, or new rules may be created). Though puzzles in a given region usually need to be completed in order, the regions themselves do not. This gives the game an open-world feel and allows players who get stuck in one region to move on to another.

Sometimes the rules of a puzzle depend not on the elements in its grid, but on the environment itself (for example, studying a tree whose branch structure mimics that of a nearby grid). There are also a number of optional environmental puzzles, where a single path is disguised in the environment. As with the game's grid puzzles, these are solved by entering path-drawing mode and tracing out the path. However, the components of such paths are distributed across different parts of the environment and disconnected. Only when a path is viewed from a certain perspective do the components join together to form a continuous path. The player then needs to find the correct viewpoint to complete the puzzle. Completing one such puzzle early in the game leads to an alternate ending, which culminates in a live-action sequence, apparently from the player's point-of-view, as they finish the game and take off their virtual reality (VR) headset, having seemingly been lost in the game for several days. They try to get back to their senses but still look for the game's puzzles in the real-life environment.

Throughout the island are audio recordings that provide insightful quotes for the player, from people such as Buddha, B.F. Skinner, and William Kingdon Clifford. Voice actors for these logs include Ashley Johnson, Phil LaMarr, Matthew Waterson, and Terra Deva. The player can also encounter a theater where short video clips, such as from James Burke's Connections series or the ending of Andrei Tarkovsky's Nostalghia, can be viewed. A number of visual illusions based on depth perception from the player's position can be found in the environment, such as two seemingly disparate human figures at different parts of the island that appear to be holding hands when viewed from the right position and angle.

== Development ==
The Witness was envisioned after Jonathan Blow released Braid. After seeing the title become a success in 2008, Blow took time off from "serious development" to prototype new game concepts, spending a few months on each. The concept that proved to be the basis for The Witness was a prototype that Blow considered to be "very ambitious and challenging". He considered it risky as it would include the development of a 3D gameplay engine, and feared that he would "fall back to square one"—referring to his lifestyle before the success of Braid—should it fail. Despite these challenges, Blow continued to go forward with The Witness as it was also the most compelling prototypes he had crafted. Direct development work on the title began in late 2008.

The game concept itself is based on an earlier title that Blow had envisioned but never completed. According to Blow, in this unfinished title, there was a side gameplay aspect with a "magic moment" that would have made the title exciting. The Witness's gameplay is based on distilling out this "magic moment" and wrapping it within its own game and story. Blow compared this moment to a spoiler for a movie, and thus avoided disclosure of the mechanic or other aspects of the game before release. The maze panel idea came from an earlier idea that Blow had around 2002 for a game involving wizards where the player would cast spells through mouse gestures, a popular element of video games at the time, with the ability to modify the effect of the spells through slight alterations of specific gestures.

One of Blow's goals for The Witness was to explore the types of non-verbal communication that can be achieved through the medium of video games, an exploration he felt to be important to understanding them as an art form. The name The Witness is derived from the core gameplay aspect of making the player attentive to the surroundings to discover meaning and solutions to puzzles without verbal communication, similar to the approach taken by Myst (1993). Blow attributes much of The Witness's design to Myst, citing Myst as a game that inspired him to become a developer. An aspect of Myst that Blow desired to correct was the nature of "pixel hunting" in some of its puzzles; the player would have to click on various parts of the virtual machinery without knowing what the end result was until sometime later in the puzzle. Within The Witness, Blow created the maze panels as a unifying mechanic for all the puzzles to avoid this confusion. While the basic mode of interaction is the same for every maze in the game, the rules for solving each puzzle differ depending on the set of symbols included on each specific maze. The game map was divided into sections so that the information the player needed to understand the puzzles in that section would be segregated to one general location, "[cutting] down a lot of ambiguity that used to exist in adventure games". Puzzles were designed to be unique and meaningful within the context of the rest of the puzzles in the game.

Part of the game's concept is a balance between puzzle-solving and perception, giving the player the freedom to explore The Witness's world and creating a non-linear approach to gameplay. Two of the first puzzles Blow created involved "clues in objects that populate the world", which led him to recognize he needed to create a world to support these puzzles. This would form a dichotomy between exploration and puzzle-solving, which "made a lot of sense" to Blow. Blow felt that a common issue among most adventure games was punishing the player for being stuck, so he created the island as an open world, allowing players to abandon puzzles they were stuck on to explore others. Blow wanted puzzles to be clearly presented in the open and without any red herrings, similar to the approach he had taken with Braid. Exploration is encouraged through the game's narrative, which is told through audio logs the player can find on the unpopulated island; Blow used the audio logs to create a "feeling of loneliness in a beautiful space" for the player. Because these logs can be found in any order, Blow hopes that each player may have a different perception of the narrative depending on how they have approached the game. These audio logs were initially intended to be more story-driven, but Blow opted later to replace these with more obfuscated and obtuse information, similar to the text elements used in Braid, to avoid directly relaying the story to the player and allow them to figure out the narrative for themselves instead. Blow's team designed the narrative so that players will gain a more concrete understanding of the story as they solve more puzzles.

Blow designed the game to allow the player to self-direct and explore and learn about the world through their own curiosity. Blow saw achievements as hollow and false rewards for the player in comparison to puzzle-solving epiphanies and only implemented them because of requirements for certification by the game console platforms. Blow was also concerned about the immersion-breaking pop-up messages that announce achievements, as he considers The Witness a "subtle kind of game" and external cues can be jarring.

For Blow, the ideal player "is inquisitive and likes to be treated as an intelligent person". He was very careful to avoid "over-tutorializing", noting that when a new idea is introduced in a game, the decision to immediately explain it to avoid confusion "kills epiphany and related things like the joy of discovery." He considers The Witness to be "anti-Nintendo", saying that "if you play a Nintendo game, there's a little character telling you every obvious thing over and over again for hours." "This is going the other way. It's more like the original Legend of Zelda, which didn't tell you anything." Blow designed the puzzles to be "as simple as they can be" while still being challenging enough that players would have "miniature epiphanies over and over again." When asked how he felt about the fact that some players may not finish the game due to its difficulty, Blow said he would rather make a game that people who like to be challenged can appreciate than "scale it back so that more people can feel like they got everything."

=== Funding and development ===
The Witness was announced in 2009 following the release of Jonathan Blow's previous game, Braid. At the time, Blow had no firm plans to release or publicize the game, and had allocated a budget of about US$800,000 for the game.

Blow created the Thekla, Inc. team for the development and publication of The Witness. The company's name is taken from a city in Italo Calvino's novel Invisible Cities. Starting in December 2009, Blow worked remotely with a 3D artist and a technical programmer full-time. Blow stated that by 2015 there were about eight full-time members on his team, though there were ten or eleven people involved around 2011 and as many as fifteen at its peak. The Witness incorporates other artists' and programmers' contributions in smaller roles, such as David Hellman, who had previously worked with Blow on Braid's art design and worked on conceptualizing the design of The Witness. Other contributors include Eric Urquhart, who provided 3D concept artwork for the game, and Ignacio Castaño, who developed a rendering system for the game's illumination and visual effects. Blow gives much credit to Orsolya Spanyol, a freshly graduated graphic artist he hired around 2011, for transforming the original sparse imagery of the island to the more vivid scenery that was included in the final game. By diversifying work on the game, Blow was able to focus more of his time on the core game design, allowing his team to implement his vision, in contrast to the development of Braid, where he also had to program much of the game himself.

The Witness took seven years to complete. Blow attributes this long period to the expansion of the game's scope as he and his team continued to work on it. He opted against time- and cost-saving solutions that would have affected his ambition for the game, such as condensing the game's scope or using an off-the-shelf game engine. Instead, he put revenues from sales of Braid, totaling around $4 million as of April 2014, into development costs. Blow had to seek out additional capital in February 2015 after exhausting the Braid revenues, but believed that regardless of the costs of extra development time, the debt would be justified in the long run. Final development costs were estimated at just under $6 million. While Blow considers The Witness to be an indie game due to the lack of funding or support from a major publisher, he also feels that the scope of the project by time and cost is closer to what a AAA studio would produce, and that it represents a new type of game development in the industry.

The island that acts as the main setting for The Witness, which remained mostly unchanged in its design since the game's inception. As a comparatively small space compared to other open-world games, Thekla kept the island as one zone which made for challenges in managing simultaneous editing and development.

The Witness uses its own engine developed by Blow and his team, which took a significant portion of the development time. Blow was insistent on using his own game engine instead of an existing solution such as Unity, as he would be able to fully control every element of a game engine that he created himself. As a compact game world compared to open-world games, the whole of the island of The Witness was treated as one zone, simplifying the gameplay and engine development. This presented a secondary challenge to the team, because to concurrently work on the project, they needed to find a means to allow multiple developers to edit areas without resorting to using locking on their version control system, as well as being able to work without being connected to a central server. Blow and his team developed an unconventional means of serializing the game world into text files that would have revision control while at the same time making it easy to find conflicting edits. They also converted the 10,000-some entities in the game world into their own individual files for tracking to further reduce conflict between edits. Other features of this system include using defined control points for terrain elements to automatically recalculate seamless connections between them within the game's rendering engine, and a built-in world editor within the game engine to easily access existing serialized elements and create new ones.

The development team had incorporated support for upcoming VR hardware within The Witness, following a November 2013 meeting between Blow and two Valve developers demonstrating their upcoming SteamVR technology, which Blow found to help enhance the player's ability to explore the island. Though the technical support for VR is present in the released game, The Witness was not designed to take advantage of virtual reality, as many of the puzzles could be "cheated" if the head movement could be separated from the body movement, according to programmer Andrew Smith.

=== Design, art, and sound ===
The design and layout of the island in The Witness has been nearly consistent since the start of development, with the team working on populating the world with specific puzzles, and detailing the landscape and other art assets. Sam Machkovech, a writer for Ars Technica who played a demo in 2012 and 2015, noted that the island had remained familiar between these two sessions. One aspect of the design is the use of power cables running across the island, connecting puzzle panels to the mechanics they control. Blow found these to help in the initial parts of the game to provide "extreme clarity" of where the player was to go next, but discovered that this also made the game too much of a grind of repeating the same pattern. Over the course of development, the power cable aspects remained, but the designers changed how easy they were to trace across the landscape as a means to guide the player towards potential objectives.

The island was designed to provide visual cues to guide the player where to go. Here, the design is aimed to highlight the blue puzzle panels on the left and that more are present in the white structure on the right. Further, the path on the ground and the pink trees in the background indicate additional options for the player to explore.

The island has been structured to provide a fair mix of puzzle-solving, exploration, and narrative elements while avoiding a "paradox of choice" by giving the player too much freedom and confusion about where to go next. According to artist Luis Antonio, one of the first things that Blow wanted the player to see was the mountain, to make them aware that this was their ultimate goal. The game initially started the player in an abandoned bunker converted to a living space, but as it was originally arranged, the player would exit the bunker not facing the mountain. Though they attempted to move and rotate the bunker space to meet Blow's goal, it was ultimately scrapped in favor of a simpler space with interior elements that fit with other portions of the game, and which the player would climb out of into the external environment with the mountain in full view.

This introductory area was also meant to serve as the tutorial, helping players to understand the fundamental mechanics of switching between solving puzzles and exploring the environment to find others, and Thekla spent a great deal of time fine-tuning the details to be clear without verbal explanation. The team's artists worked to support Blow's objective of guiding the player by using contrasts of color and of natural and man-made structures to highlight areas that the player would be drawn towards. Blow wanted the game's art to start off with bright colors and high saturation, to present a type of optimism to the player, while later settings would become more dull. He also wanted to make sure all elements stood out to avoid visual noise that may have interfered with puzzle solving. To accomplish this, he and his team often had to review the game as if they were new players to it, and identify what elements they were visually drawn to; this would often identify features of the island they had incorporated early on but were no longer appropriate for the final game.

The art style was influenced by a simplification approach, eliminating enough details but keeping overall shapes to make objects clearly recognizable. According to Antonio, they took inspiration for simplification from real-world photography, from artwork, and from the environments of the games Journey, Team Fortress 2, and Mirror's Edge. They still wanted to ensure that a player would be able to recognize an area of the island they were in based on the visual appearance, such as by the types of trees around them, and ensured there was enough distinction while simplifying the assets to make this possible. Blow's team also engaged with Fourm Design Studio, a real-world architecture firm, and Fletcher Studio, a landscape architecture team, to help develop the environments for The Witness. According to Fourm's founder, Deanna Van Buren, they developed the various man-made and cultivated areas based on the concept of three different civilization periods, with later civilizations building on the structures from earlier ones and repurposing these structures as needed. Their studios helped to bring design principles to the main development team, allowing them to then extrapolate their own ideas for the final game. Blow said that the guidance and advice of the architects helped to craft the island in a way that "feels more immersive just because the details are in place, and your brain kind of picks up on it". Blow gives an example of how many of the buildings on the island are in various states of deterioration, but were designed as fully detailed and complete structures and purposely worn down to create the ruined look; the resulting structures retain logically consistent details, such as the remains of wooden support posts for rotted-away stairways in a castle, which aid in immersion for the player.

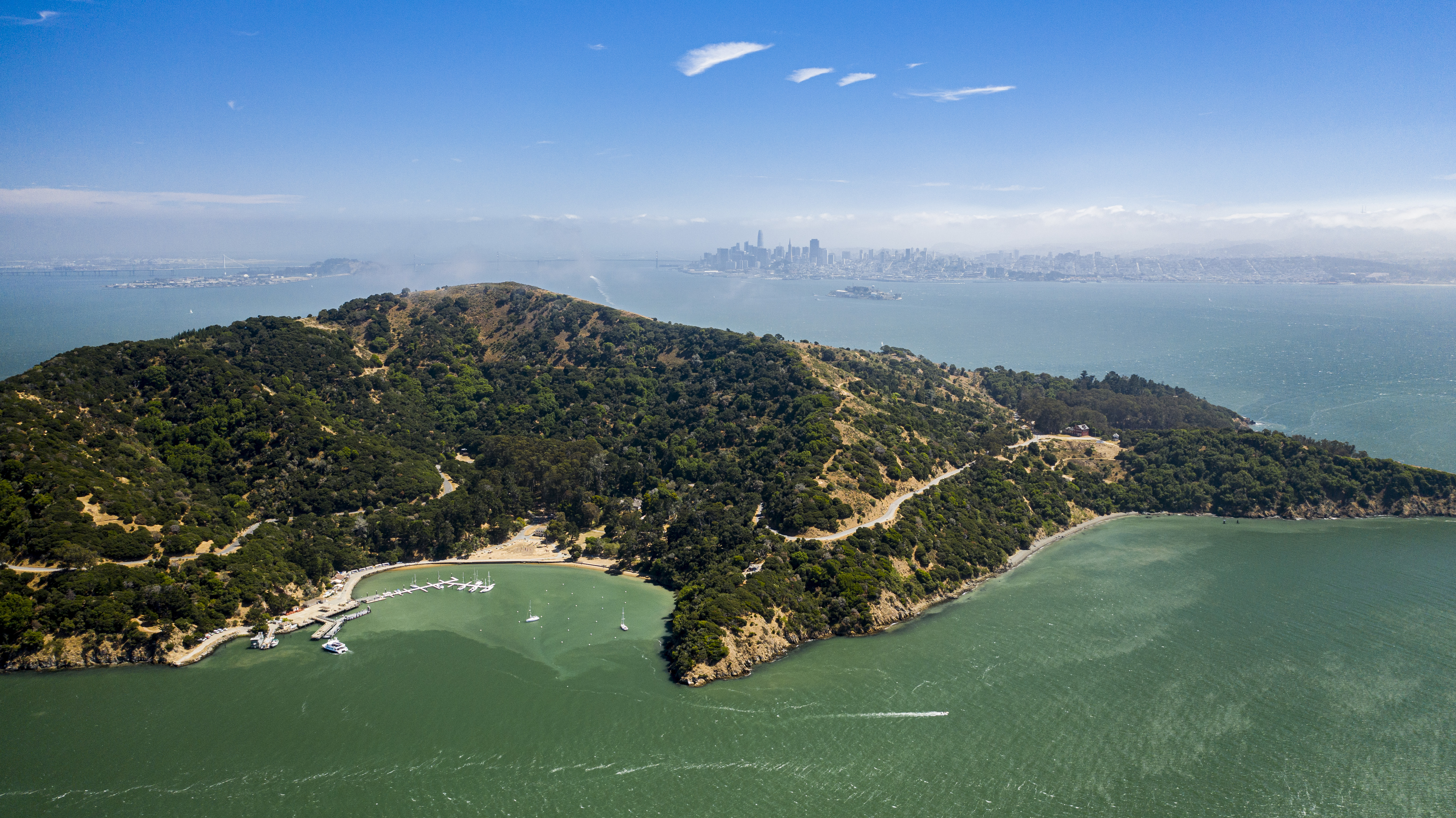
Ambient sound effects were recorded on Angel Island, off the coast from Marin County, California.

The final game shipped with very little music, instead relying on the ambient sounds of the environment, which were developed by Wabi Sabi Sound. Blow felt that the addition of music was a "layer of stuff that works against the game". The ambient sound effects were difficult to include, as the game world has no wildlife, making the player aware of how alone they are while on the island. Most of the ambient sounds were recorded by Andrew Lackey of Wabi Sabi Sound, capturing them while walking around Angel Island in the San Francisco Bay. Lackey layered the various sound effects to enable many different variations depending on the player's location on the island while also providing a seamless transition from one environment to the next.

== Marketing and release ==
The game was quietly revealed to the public by Blow at the 2010 Penny Arcade Expo (PAX) with the help of independent developers Chris Hecker and Andy Schatz, who were sharing booth space for demonstrations of their own games, SpyParty and Monaco: What's Yours Is Mine; the two provided a table for demonstrating The Witness without any signs or other markings. Blow wanted to keep the demonstration subtle and a surprise and to see players' reactions without the pressure of other players waiting in line to try the game. Blow himself was present at the Expo but kept his distance from the demonstration table. The fact that The Witness was playable at the Expo was only fully revealed after the Expo by both Blow and Stephen Totilo of Kotaku, who saw and played the game but did not mention its presence until later. Players who tried the game at PAX or saw footage of it from the Kotaku article afterward became concerned that The Witness would simply be a series of mazes to solve. Blow reiterated that there was more to the game than mazes, and that he encountered similar problems when trying to promote Braid, since seeing videos of portions of the game does not serve to demonstrate "what happens in the player's mind during the puzzle-solving process".

At the time of the 2010 reveal, Blow had anticipated releasing The Witness on Windows and iOS devices, and on an unspecified set of consoles, including possibly the Xbox 360 and PlayStation 3. Later that year, Blow restated his stance, and felt that there would be no console release on initial release, considering the amount of additional programming time and limitations of the console platforms. In November 2011, Blow was able to hire two more programmers, and had rethought the release for consoles; while he could not commit to a console release initially, the additional labor would help make it possible to have one console version ready at the time of launch, with the version for other consoles to be made available at a later time. As development progressed and its engine become more complex, Blow opted to forgo the development of seventh-generation console versions, citing their "relatively low system specs".

Around 2012, development of The Witness for the next generation of consoles with improved hardware capabilities became a possibility, and Blow and his team started looking at this opportunity. They had discounted the Wii U, again citing low specs, and decided to choose between the PlayStation 4 and the Xbox One platforms. At the time of this decision, Sony was able to provide hardware information and development kits. Sony also sought out independent developers like Blow to learn about the upcoming PlayStation 4 in preparation for its launch, while Microsoft had not yet released firm specifications for their console. Blow opted to go with the PlayStation platform; this decision was also aided by representatives from Sony who were interested in bringing the game to their system, and Sony's larger trend of bringing more downloadable and independently developed games to their next console, in contrast to Microsoft's tighter controls. Blow affirmed that there was no monetary deal involved with this decision. He also later acknowledged that he had had difficulties working with Microsoft in the past, and had previously explained several of the issues he had to go through with Microsoft to release his earlier game Braid. The Witness had been planned as a launch-window title for the PlayStation 4 in 2013, a limited-time console exclusive. The Windows and iOS versions, at that point, were planned to be released alongside the PlayStation 4 version, barring any development delays that Blow and his team encountered. Other console versions would come later if they opted to develop for them.

The Witness remained in development, missing the planned 2013 release while Blow and his team continued to improve and fine-tune the game. In September 2015, Blow announced that release was set for January 26, 2016, simultaneously for PlayStation 4 and Windows, with the iOS version to follow shortly thereafter. Though the ESRB rated the title for the Xbox One just prior to release, Blow clarified that they had no plans for release on that platform at the time and were only acquiring the ESRB rating for that console platform at the same time as the other confirmed versions to avoid having to redo that step prior to release in the future. About a week before its release, Blow announced that the game would be priced at $39.99, an amount he said was "fairly reflective of what the game is". The cost was met with some criticism that it was a high price for an indie game. Game journalists believed the price was justified given the estimated 100-hour playtime Blow had stated, and also compared it to a similar puzzle game, The Talos Principle (2014), which was released for the same price. To help promote the game, the development team created three "long screenshot" videos, inspired by the experimental film Koyaanisqatsi, that slowly panned across the island and its features without additional commentary.

Blow stated that they had been in discussions with publishers for a physical release, but opted to not do that step initially, citing the additional time that would have been needed for the manufacturing and distribution processes. However, with the game completed and released digitally, they are looking to potential retail versions.

Following release, some players reported getting motion sickness due to a combination of the narrow field of view and the bobbing of the player's viewpoint simulating walking motions. Blow stated that they were working on a patch to allow players to adjust their field of view, disable the head bobbing, and enable faster movement options. In August 2016, the Windows version was updated to provide support for Nvidia's Ansel extension, which allows players to compose shots to be rendered in ultra-high resolutions or for 3D and virtual reality devices. Following Sony's announcement of the PlayStation 4 Pro, Blow said they would patch the game for that console to support 4k resolution without sacrificing framerate. Blow is also working to support devices with high dynamic range (HDR) for both PlayStation 4 and PlayStation 4 Pro.

The Xbox One version was released on September 13, 2016. Blow said in August 2016 that they were looking into porting the game to mobile devices, but it would require them to reduce the quality of the graphics and investigate an alternate control scheme that would work on touch screens. An Android version for the Nvidia Shield was released on January 16, 2017. The iOS version was released on September 20, 2017.

== Reception ==
Reception

Aggregate score
Aggregator	Score
Metacritic	PC: 87/100; PS4: 87/100; XONE: 86/100 iOS: 88/100

Review scores
Publication	Score
Destructoid	10/10
Edge	9/10
Game Informer	9.25/10
GameRevolution	5/5
GameSpot	9/10
GamesRadar+	3/5
Giant Bomb	5/5
IGN	10/10
PC Gamer (US)	89/100
Polygon	8/10
TouchArcade	4.5/5
USgamer	2/5
VideoGamer.com	10/10

The Witness received "generally favorable reviews" on all platforms, according to the review aggregator website Metacritic.

Chloi Rad of IGN awarded the game a perfect score of 10/10, calling it a masterpiece and stating that it was "[a] beautiful, powerful, and cleverly designed puzzle game with a wealth of mysteries to unravel." Brenna Hillier from VG247 praised the game's use of a first-person perspective to present what otherwise could have been a simple series of puzzle boards, and was impressed by the steep learning curve that the puzzles presented, "impossible, incomprehensible puzzles melt into simple exercises after you’ve visited nearby locations". Aaron Riccio of Slant Magazine found that there was a "jarring shift" once the player reached the puzzles inside the mountain, with puzzles that relied more on obfuscation in a more clinical environment, contrasting with the rest of the island.

Julie Muncy of Wired, though impressed, noted that the lack of any narrative or gameplay guidance could cause "players to bounce off [the game] entirely". Muncy noted that Blow wanted to make games for people who read Gravity's Rainbow, but whereas the novel was difficult yet "enamored with the world and the people in it", the game felt lifeless, concluding "It's hard, but empty. That's not the same thing." Cian Maher of Rock Paper Shotgun disagreed, describing the game as "hardcore postmodern", and concluding that Blow "actually did make a game for people who like to read Gravity's Rainbow." Oli Welsh of Eurogamer praised the game's puzzles for providing numerous "eureka" moments to the player and considered the title as the video game analog of the Goldberg Variations, but felt that the narrative atop the puzzles was "self-involved and wilfully obscure" and believed that it could have been omitted, as Blow and his team "needn't have tried to make a puzzle out of art when he had already, so beautifully and so successfully, made art out of puzzles". Justin McElroy of Polygon gave the game an 8/10 rating, describing it as "uplifting but frustrating"; he criticized the length of time involved in solving certain puzzles while expressing concern that less-patient players would take shortcuts. "That will naturally lead to more cheating. It will snowball." Bob Mackey of USgamer was more critical, giving it 2 of 5 stars. Though he praised its visuals and setting, Mackey found the puzzles to be very difficult, saying that "there's simply too much going on to give me the proper feedback about what I'm getting wrong" and suggesting that "Blow was maybe a little too close to his work".

Several theories have been proposed as to the meaning of the story in The Witness. In attempting to analyze the meaning of the game, David Roberts of GamesRadar+ said he felt that The Witness was about the nature of epiphanies within the scope of epistemology, the theory of knowledge. Roberts stated that as one proceeds through the puzzles, the player begins to recognize other elements of the island setting as puzzles, and to obtain the game's credit sequence (the "true ending" as described by Roberts), the player solves such an environmental puzzle built into one of the first puzzles they would encounter on the island: "the end of your journey becomes the beginning, and the beginning leads to the end – the very cycle of epiphany".

Within a week of release, Blow stated that sales of The Witness had nearly outpaced what Braid had done during its first year of release. He later specified that first-week sales were over 100,000 copies, with gross revenues over $5 million, on track to break even with development costs, with which Thekla would start considering porting the game to other platforms, potentially including iOS, Android, OS X, and Xbox One. During this time, Blow observed that the Windows version of The Witness was one of the top downloads through illegal BitTorrent sites, comparable to what he had seen for Braid. He had opted to forgo strong digital rights management for the title, as he believes "people should have the freedom to own things", but has said he may change his mind and software piracy controls "might happen on the next game".

=== Accolades ===
Year	Award	Category	Result	Ref.
2016	Golden Joystick Awards 2016	Best Original Game	Nominated	
2016	Golden Joystick Awards 2016	Best Visual Design	Nominated	
2016	Golden Joystick Awards 2016	Best Indie Game	Nominated	
2016	Golden Joystick Awards 2016	Best Gaming Moment	Nominated	
2016	Golden Joystick Awards 2016	Game of the Year	Nominated	
2016	Golden Joystick Awards 2016	PlayStation Game of the Year	Nominated	
2016	The Game Awards 2016	Best Independent Game	Nominated	
2016	17th Game Developers Choice Awards	Best Design	Nominated	
2016	17th Game Developers Choice Awards	Innovation Award	Nominated	
2016	SXSW Gaming Awards	Excellence in Design	Nominated	
2016	SXSW Gaming Awards	Excellence in Art	Nominated	
2016	13th British Academy Games Awards	Game Design	Nominated	
2016	13th British Academy Games Awards	Game Innovation	Nominated	
2016	13th British Academy Games Awards	Best Debut	Nominated	
2016	13th British Academy Games Awards	Original Property	Nominated	
2016	Canadian Videogame Awards 2016	Fans' Choice: Best International Game	Nominated	

== Legacy ==
The Witness is widely regarded as one of the best games of the 2010s. The game appeared on 'Best of the decade' features from IGN, Polygon, NME, CNET, and National Post. Edge considered the game the 22nd-best game of all time in 2017, and IGN ranked it the 59th-best in 2022.

The Witness inspired the parody video game The Looker by Subcreation Studio, released in 2022.
