= Read-Only Memory (publisher) =

British publisher of video game art books

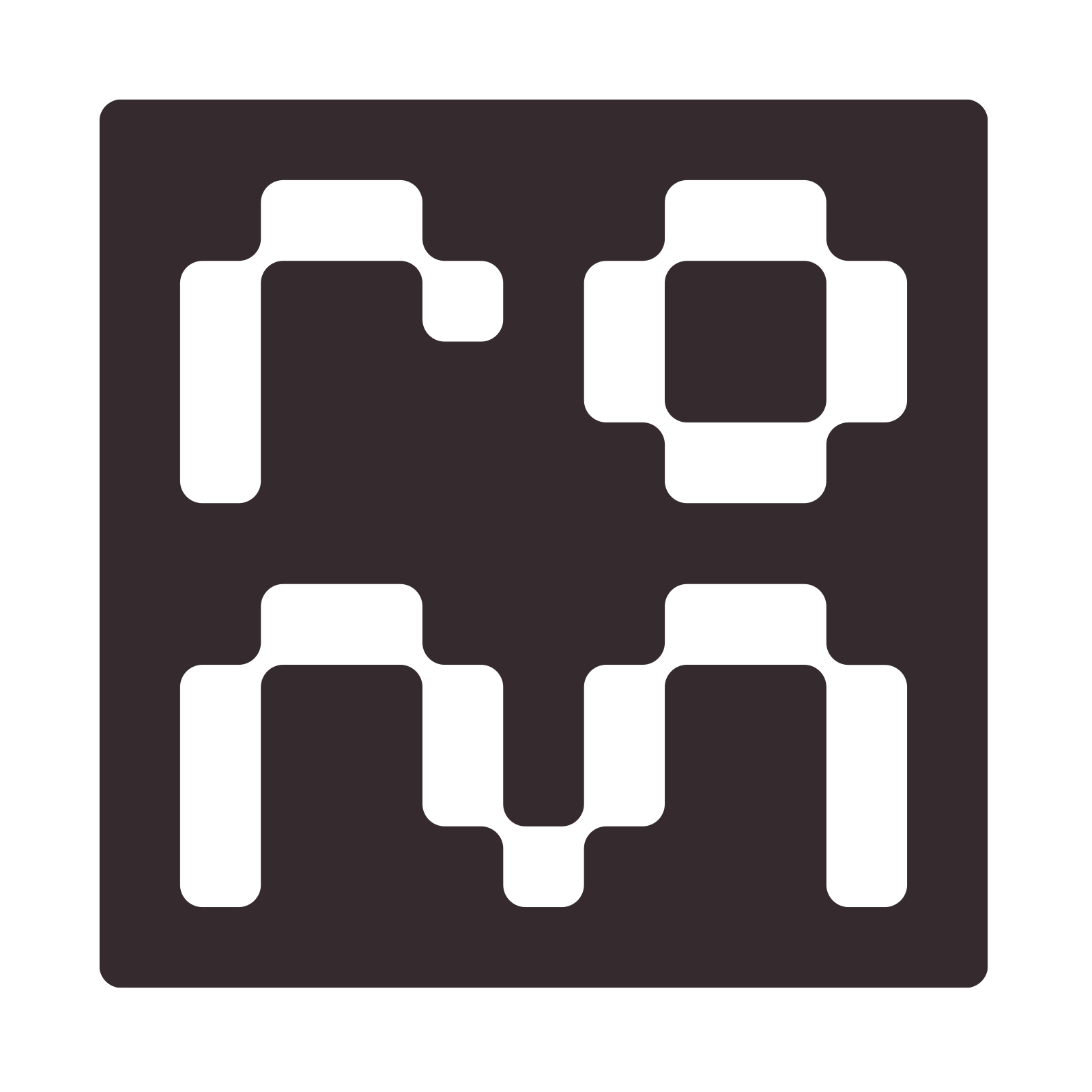
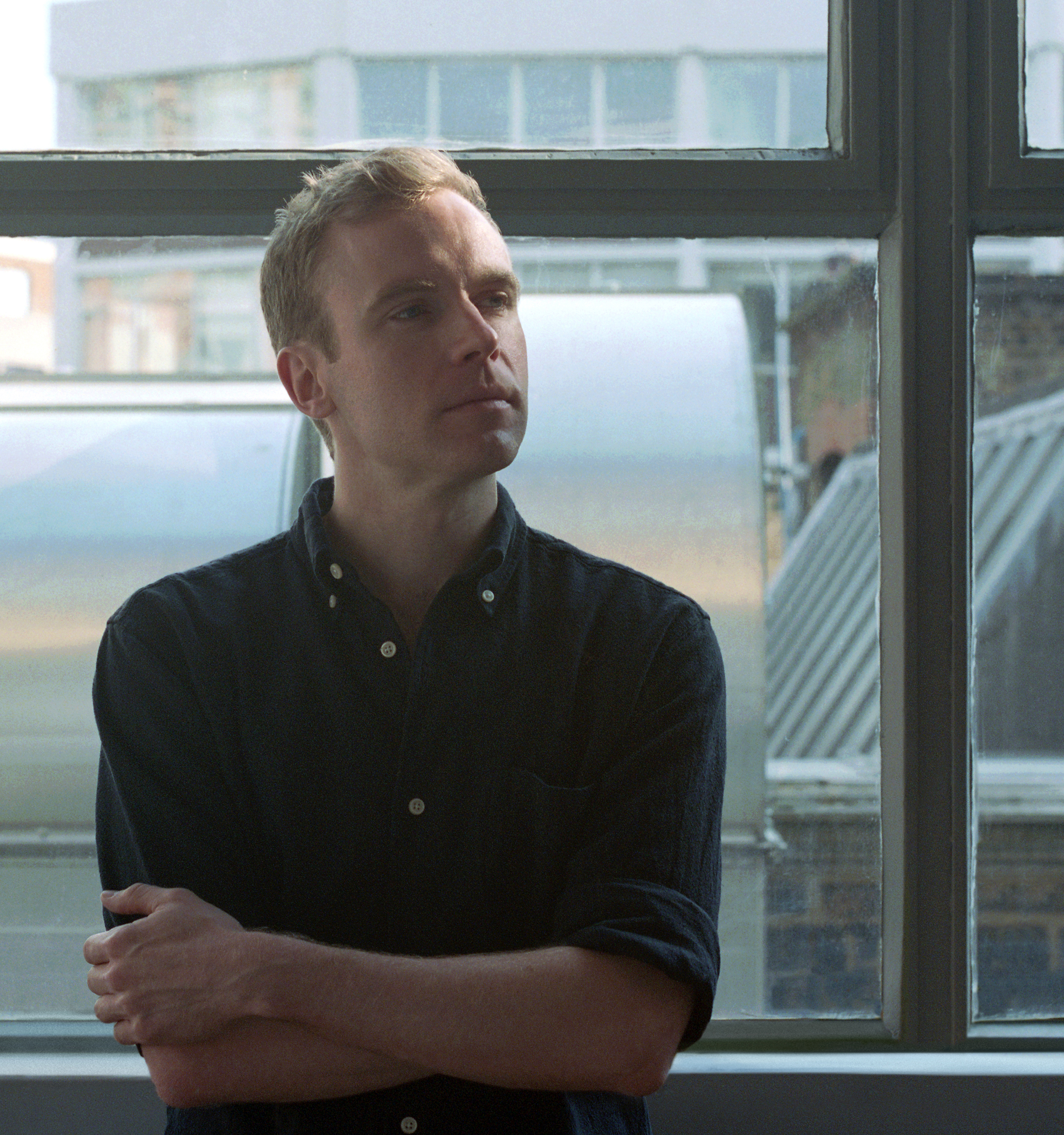
Read-Only Memory company logo and Darren Wall, its founder and editor-in-chief

Read-Only Memory is a British publisher of art books on topics of video game history and culture. Following a resurgence of interest in 1980s and '90s British video game development, the company crowdfunded and produced four art books: an oral history of that Britsoft era, two books on British developers Sensible Software and The Bitmap Brothers, and a definitive volume on the Sega Mega Drive/Genesis, for which the publisher became best known. Read-Only Memory's books are archival anthologies, including original design documents juxtaposed with developer interviews and high-quality prints of in-game graphics. Reviewers were particularly impressed with each book's breadth of unreleased concepts.

== History and publications ==
The 30th anniversary of the ZX Spectrum home computer in 2012 generated renewed interest in Britsoft—a "golden era" of British video game development, particularly in the 1980s and '90s, little publicised outside Britain. Between games republished on digital platforms like Steam, re-releases for mobile platforms, and related crowdfunding projects through Kickstarter, coverage of British games development was brought closer to parity with the coverage of Japanese and American game developers. Through its Kickstarter projects, Read-Only Memory grew as a British publisher of art books on topics of video game history and culture. Kiyonori Muroga, the editor-in-chief of Japanese graphic design magazine Idea, highlighted Read-Only Memory in 2015 as performing groundbreaking art book design work with exceptional product quality.

In late 2013, graphic designer Darren Wall released an art book about the history of British developer Sensible Software. Funded through the crowdfunding website Kickstarter and written by games journalist Gary Penn of Zzap!64, Sensible Software 1986–1999 is a 340-page anthology of the company's full catalogue, from its popular 16-bit games (e.g. Sensible Soccer, Cannon Fodder, Wizball) to its lesser-known products and features. It also explains the personalities behind the company, mainly its founders Jon Hare and Chris Yates, through long-form interviews. Hare was elated when Wall originally contacted him about the project, but Yates, who has been estranged from Hare since 2003, did not participate. Hare explained the company's issues with scaling and hiring, and how the company was slow to transition to 3D graphics. Other commentators featured in the book include developer and entrepreneur David Darling, television personality Dominik Diamond, musician Martin Galway, and games journalist Gary Whitta.

Wall designed Sensible Software 1986–1999 in the style of an art monograph, with full pages of in-game art, concept art, and other visual assets. Each major game received its own chapter. As part of his design process, Wall personally revisited the company's catalogue to capture screenshots. The project had an immediate response during its 2012 Kickstarter campaign, and met its goal of $30,000 to begin production. Reviewers were impressed by the details of the company's unreleased concepts. Kotaku praised the volume and its breadth of personnel interviewed, though Metro wrote the absence of Sensible co-founder Yates was conspicuous. Still, the book did not appear to be one-sided. Nintendo Life called the book "an absolutely essential read" for those interested in 1990s Britsoft. The book was made available on the website of Read-Only Memory, Wall's new publishing imprint.

=== Sega Mega Drive/Genesis: Collected Works ===
Read-Only Memory released its next art book in late 2014. Sega Mega Drive/Genesis: Collected Works covers the development, life, and legacy of Sega's 16-bit console. The 352-page book sought to be the "definitive volume" on the console. It was officially licensed by Sega and contains about 30 interviews with former team members and documentary production artwork from both classic and lesser-known games. Its interview subjects include former Sega president Hayao Nakayama, former Sega of America CEO Tom Kalinske, and developers such as Greg Johnson (Toejam & Earl), Yu Suzuki (OutRun), and Yuji Naka (Sonic). Its illustrations and fold-out pages include in-game pixel art, character concepts, storyboards, and other design documents. The publisher was given "unprecedented access" to Sega's archives, where they found new technical drawings, concepts, and alternative designs. The book contains an essay by The Guardian games journalist Keith Stuart, and its foreword was written by games journalist Dave Perry.

The publisher presented Sega with a mock-up of the book and its potential design and content. Sega liked the focus on the 16-bit console, approved the project, and offered access to their developers and archives in Japan. Wall described himself as "a die-hard Mega Drive fan" and was thrilled to see Sega's archival findings. Read-Only Memory ran a Kickstarter crowdfunding campaign in November 2013 to fund the book's publication. Supporters received perks including archival prints from Sonic the Hedgehog character designer Naoto Ohshima. Upon doubling the project's funding goal, Wall and Read-Only Memory announced additional interviews and content to be included. The campaign ultimately raised over three times its goal: €98,000. The campaign also propelled Sega management from the period to offer their aid.

A.V. Club called it "a classy, beautiful tome" with new treasures in each read. Kotaku's reviewer echoed those terms and said the book was among the best he had read in the video game genre, from its coffee table book quality to its breadth of archival content. He reserved particular praise for the included design documentation of Streets of Rage and Gunstar Heroes, which included hand-drawn notes and level design sketches. The German Eurogamer wrote that the book had little to criticize apart from its paucity of detail on the console's technical aspects. Nintendo Life found the book flawless, as both accessible and interesting to newcomers as well as "every Sega fan's dream come true". Read-Only Memory editor-in-chief Darren Wall told The Guardian how crowdfunders shared their experiences and opinions of the book on Twitter, which generated significant traffic to the publisher's website.

=== Britsoft and Bitmap Brothers ===
Read-Only Memory published Britsoft: An Oral History in 2015 and The Bitmap Brothers: Universe in 2016, both about a golden age of British game development. Britsoft: An Oral History was designed as a companion to the 2014 film From Bedrooms to Billions, which covers the "Britsoft" era of British game development from the late '70s bedroom developer cottage industry to the present-day billion-pound industry. The book uses developer interviews to tell the era's story so as to supplement rather than reproduce the film's narrative. Interviewed developers include coders and designers David Braben, Geoff Crammond, Mel Croucher, Dino Dini, Jon Hare, Archer Maclean, Jeff Minter, Peter Molyneux and David Perry, businessman David Darling, and writers Chris Anderson, Gary Penn, and Julian Rignall. The book's editor and former Edge editor, Alex Wiltshire, divides the title into eight sections: the developers' initial exposure to video games, the first wave as it attempts to sell its software in the early 1980s, the industry that begins to form, the wealth that comes to the industry, the relationship between these developers and a burgeoning games journalism, the transition from home computers to 16-bit hardware, the coalescing of industry and closure of small businesses, and the late 1990s dispersion as these developers left the industry or moved to less prominent roles in the United States. The book is designed to be read linearly and out of order, based on its presentation as anecdotal snippets rather than long text blocks. It also features linked page numbering such that readers can skip directly to the developer's next page. Reviewers described the 422-page volume by its heft, comprehensiveness, and academicism. Eurogamer and The Verge recommended the book for readers interested in the era as well as readers interested in artistic production. Nintendo Life described the book as lavish, lush, and pleasurable. Reviewers lightly criticised the book's lack of signposted introductions to the many characters, and complained of needing to flip to the appendix for explanatory footnotes and captions for the book's personalities and illustrations. Eurogamer considered the book to come as close to a definitive history of British gaming as is feasible, and praised the book's intimate and fun tone on otherwise dry subject matter.

The second book was published on the subject of The Bitmap Brothers, a prominent British developer known for games such as Speedball, Xenon, and The Chaos Engine. Written by games journalist Duncan Harris, the 360-page book covers the developer's catalogue alongside concept art and interviews with its personnel. It features information about the developer's unfinished games and possible sequels. An interview with Sega's Tetsuya Mizuguchi spoke to the developer's influence, and musicians Tim Simenon and John Foxx discussed the role of music in the developer's games. Patrons who crowdfunded the project on Kickstarter received rewards including signed copies of the book and art prints. Monocle and Kotaku UK praised the book's content and beauty, while Nintendo Life's reviewer praised the book's anecdotes and recommended the title for readers interested in the history of British games.

In late 2017, Read-Only Memory partnered with Polygon to publish the website's oral history of Final Fantasy VII with Kickstarter crowdfunding. The book, 500 Years Later: An Oral History of Final Fantasy 7, adds new illustrations, additional standalone interviews, and a foreword by the creator of the Final Fantasy series.
