= Video games in the United Kingdom =

The United Kingdom has the largest video game sector in Europe. By revenue, the UK had the second-largest video game market in Europe in 2022 after Germany, and the sixth-largest globally. By sales, it is Europe's largest market, having overtaken Germany in 2022. The UK video game market was worth £7.16 billion ($9.81 billion) in 2021, a 2% increase over the previous year. In 2025, the UK became the third-largest exporter of video games, up from fourth-largest in 2024.

While the North American and Japanese markets were thriving in the early 1980s with arcade and home console games, the UK's game industry grew out of amateur "bedroom coders" on home computers, in part due to the government's initiative, through the BBC to teach computer programming to students. Subsequently, many larger developers and publishers were established in the late 1980s and early 1990s. Many major video game franchises are developed in the UK, including Grand Theft Auto, Tomb Raider, Lemmings, Worms, Batman Arkham, Football Manager, LittleBigPlanet, Burnout, Forza Horizon, Driver (series) and Wipeout, making Britain the third-largest producer of video game series behind Japan and the United States. The best-selling video game series made in the UK is Grand Theft Auto (primarily developed by Rockstar North in Edinburgh), which has sold over 480 million copies as of November 2026; the most recent instalment Grand Theft Auto V became the fastest-selling video game of all time by making $815.7 million (£511.8 million) in sales worldwide during the first 24 hours of the game's sale. Another major British contribution to the game industry was the ZX Spectrum home computer, released in 1982.

The organisations responsible for rating video games in the UK are the British Board of Film Classification and PEGI, the latter of which was elected to rate British games in 2009 and began doing so in July 2012. The United Kingdom's video game industry is estimated to employ 20,000 people.

== History ==
=== Early history (1950s–1960s) ===
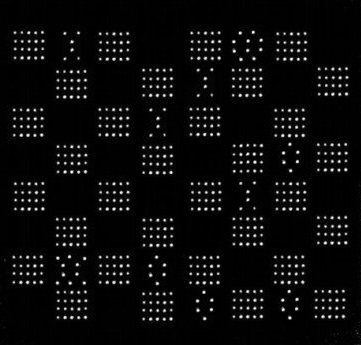
Christopher Strachey's Draughts is the first verifiable video game to run on a general-purpose computer.

The United Kingdom was a key participant in the 18th and 19th-century history of computing—both in its theoretical underpinnings (e.g., George Boole's Boolean algebra) and its practical application, including the first computing device. Notable figures like Charles Babbage and Ada Lovelace created a fundamental computer, the mechanical-based difference engine, and a primitive programming language. As computers moved to electronic and digital elements in the mid-20th century, Alan Turing established the foundation of modern computer science and the concept of artificial intelligence. The UK's involvement in World War II also pushed advances in computing, particularly in cryptography, such as the Colossus computer, to help decipher enemy messages. This helped to create a post-war drive to improve computers and computing, most prominently at several academic institutions, including the University of Manchester and Cambridge University. Wider use of computers for general-purpose applications grew in the late 1960s and early 1970s. In the 1980s, British engineers spawned the ARM architecture family: the now-ubiquitous, de facto reference implementation of the reduced instruction set computing paradigm would become the heart of games consoles (e.g., the Nintendo Switch) and mobile gaming.

Christopher Strachey's Draughts, completed around 1951 at the British National Physical Laboratory, is the first known video game to run on a general-purpose computer.

=== Early arcade video games (1970s–1980s) ===
Up until the 1970s, British amusement arcades typically had mechanical arcade games, electro-mechanical games, and pinball machines. Arcade video games arrived with the 1973 release of Pong by Atari, Inc., although it was preceded by six months by a clone called Ping Pong by Alca Electronics of Manchester, a company that would make unlicensed copies of many games over the next decade. Pong and other similar sports video game clones became popular in British arcades for about a year, then were dismissed as a fad. Atari's Breakout (1976) drew a short-lived following.

In 1978, Taito's shoot 'em up game Space Invaders launched the golden age of arcade video games. To keep up with demand for the game, Taito licensed distribution rights to Midway Manufacturing. By 1979, Space Invaders had sold 85,000 arcade cabinets in the United Kingdom, installed across locations such as arcades, pubs, and public buildings.

Space Invaders was the first video game to attract political controversy when a 1981 Private Member's Bill known as the "Control of Space Invaders (and other Electronic Games) Bill", drafted by British Labour Member of Parliament (MP) George Foulkes, attempted to allow local councils to restrict the game and those like it by licensing for its "addictive properties" and for causing "deviancy". Conservative MP Michael Brown defended the game as "innocent and harmless pleasure", which he himself had enjoyed that day, and criticized the bill as an example of "Socialist beliefs in restriction and control". A motion to bring the bill before Parliament was defeated by 114 votes to 94 votes; the bill itself was never considered by Parliament.

Space Invaders was followed by other hit arcade video games, including Namco's shoot 'em up Galaxian (1979) and maze game Pac-Man (1980), the scrolling shooters Scramble by Konami and Defender by Williams Electronics, Nintendo's platform game Donkey Kong (1981), and Namco's racing game Pole Position (1982) distributed by Atari. One of the earliest video game magazines, Computer and Video Games, began publication in the United Kingdom in 1981.

=== Early home video games (early 1980s) ===
Some of the first generation of video game consoles like dedicated Pong consoles were imported into the UK but did not gain much traction. Home video games were popularized in the United Kingdom during 1982–1984. There was a short-lived home console market in the United Kingdom during the early 1980s. The success of Space Invaders in the arcades generated demand for the Atari VCS, which had an official home version of Space Invaders released in 1980. The Atari VCS sold 125,000 units in the United Kingdom that year along with 500,000 game cartridges, becoming the best-selling console in the UK up until then. Portable LCD games also gained popularity the same year, including Space Invaders clones such as Atari's Galaxy Invaders and Casio's MG-880 calculator game, as well as the Sharp PC-1211 pocket computer sold by Tandy under the Radio Shack TRS-80 brand.

The home console market crash of 1983, whose effects primarily impacted North America, was offset in the UK by the simultaneous transition to a market dominated by microcomputers and LCD games. The switch towards microcomputers, and the more transient fad of LCD games, was already an apparent, emergent trend by the time of the crash, which, in the UK, merely accelerated an inevitable transition to microcomputers. The home computer market and concomitant domestic game production took off so rapidly during 1983 and thereafter that the UK market, in totality, not only withstood the crash but immediately began growing, albeit almost entirely in the new direction of microcomputers. Pre-dating and then becoming concurrent with the console market's troubles, the arrival of affordable home computers in the early 1980s, with graphical capabilities matching or exceeding the second-generation consoles, such as the Atari VCS, dealt a severe blow to consoles in the UK. Home computers offered significantly cheaper software compared to the more expensive console game cartridges. By 1984, computer games had overtaken both consoles and LCD games as the largest sector of the UK home video game market.

=== Microcomputer popularity (1980s) ===
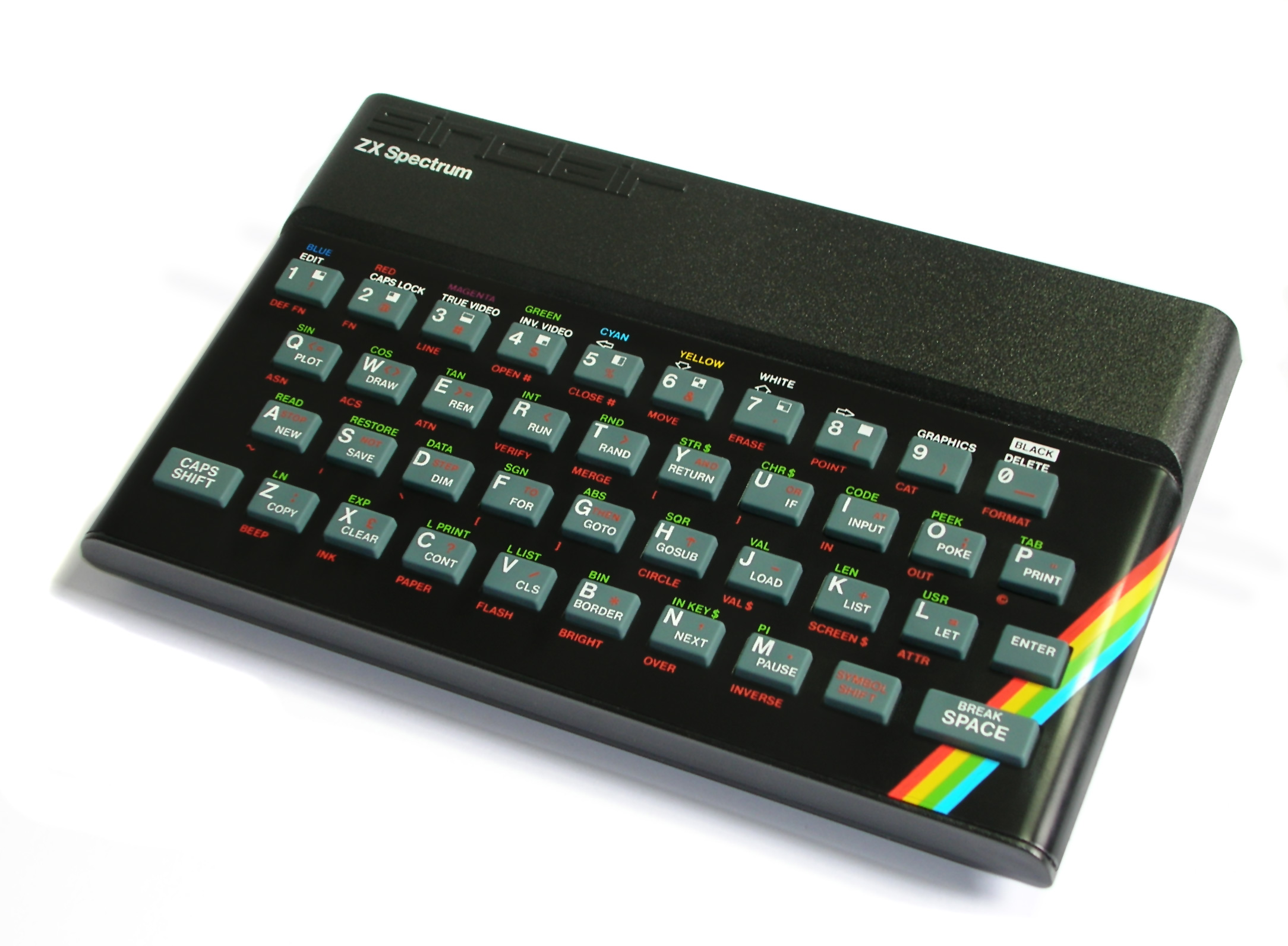
The popularity of the ZX Spectrum was instrumental in driving the start of the UK home computer game industry.

Whereas the North American and Japanese home video game markets boomed with console games, the UK market for home video games was grown out of home computers (also known as microcomputers), specifically the BBC Micro from Acorn Computers in 1981, and the ZX Spectrum from Sinclair Research (alongside Sinclair's earlier ZX80 and ZX81 systems) and the Commodore 64 by Commodore International in 1982. In the early 1980s, the UK home computer game industry initially began with British programmers developing unofficial ports and clones of arcade games for home computers, followed by original computer games. The saturation of home computers immunised the UK against the effects of the North American video game crash in 1983, after which the microcomputer game market continued to grow, with significant levels of domestic game production taking place. In 1984, computer games replaced console and LCD games as the largest sector of the UK home video game market.

Computer literacy had been seen by the UK government as a key skill that Britain's children should possess to help improve the technology savvy of the nation in the future. While home computers did exist in the UK market like the Commodore PET and Apple II (both released in 1977), these were comparatively expensive for broad use across the population. The BBC worked with Acorn to create the low-cost BBC Micro home computer alongside a set of broadcast programming to help teach fundamentals of computers for school-aged children. This was used in up to 80% of the schools in the UK at the time, and led to creation of the Spectrum and Commodore 64 to help meet growing demand for the systems. Additionally, youth of the United Kingdom at that time were tinkerers, taking apart and repairing devices including electronics, and the nature of computer programming felt within this same scope.

The United Kingdom had already had a history with board games prior to this revolution, as well as laying claim to starting the fantasy literary genre through J. R. R. Tolkien's works, a major point of inspiration for the Dungeons & Dragons tabletop role-playing game. Thus, with the ability to program their own games through these early home computers, the UK developed an initial home computer game market. Throughout most of the 1980s, British games were typically made by only one person with no formal experience in computer programming attempting to realise a singular vision (these developers were known as "bedroom coders"; some of them achieved a status akin to rockstars within the tech market, and even popular culture more broadly). As there were few game stores in the UK at that time, most of these coders turned to mail order, sending out copies of their games on cassette tape for use in the computer's tape drives. A market developed for companies to help such programmer sell and distribute their games. This industry took off after the release of the ZX Spectrum in 1982: by the end of 1983 there were more than 450 companies selling video games on cassette compared to 95 the year before. An estimated 10,000 to 50,000 youth, mostly male, were making games out of their homes at this time based on advertisements for games in popular magazines. The growth of video games in the UK during this period was comparable to the punk subculture, fueled by young people making money from their games.

One of the earliest such successful titles was Manic Miner, developed and released by Matthew Smith in 1983, sold by Bug-Byte, one of the first publishers in this market. While a loose clone of the United States-developed Miner 2049er, Manic Miner incorporated elements of British humour and other oddities. Manic Miner is considered the quintessential "British game" for this reason, and since then, inspired similar games with the same type of British wit and humour through the present. Another key title from this period was Elite, developed by David Braben and Ian Bell and released in 1984. A non-linear space exploration, trading and combat game, Elite established many of the principles of the open world gameplay concept that are used in most space simulation games today as well as influencing the Grand Theft Auto series, itself a pinnacle of open-world design.

The popularity of video games on home computers within the UK drew sales away from other video game formats. Despite the lack of exposure to the North American crash of 1983, the UK industry of this period still had its notable failures. The success of Imagine Software, formed by former members of Bug-Byte, drew the attention of the BBC as part of a documentary series Commercial Breaks that had been examining successful businesses in new industries. During 1983 and 1984, Imagine had tried to expand its capabilities beyond game programming as well as push the idea of "megagames" that stretched a computer's hardware limits and would be sold at a higher cost, but these efforts backfired, costing Imagine staff and money. By the time the BBC began filming for this episode of Commercial Breaks, Imagine was in a downward spiral, which was notoriously documented by the BBC. A short-term collapse of the computer market occurred from the end of 1984 into 1985. Rival companies Sinclair Research and Acorn Computers began entering a price war on competing systems ahead of end-of-year holidays sales, which created a consumer perception that these systems were nothing more than toys rather than productivity tools. In early 1985, financial institutions became wary of investments into computer companies due to other activities they had made as well. Acorn was acquired by Olivetti over 1985, while Sinclair Research was sold to Amstrad in 1986.

=== Arrival of 16-bit computers (1985–1995) ===
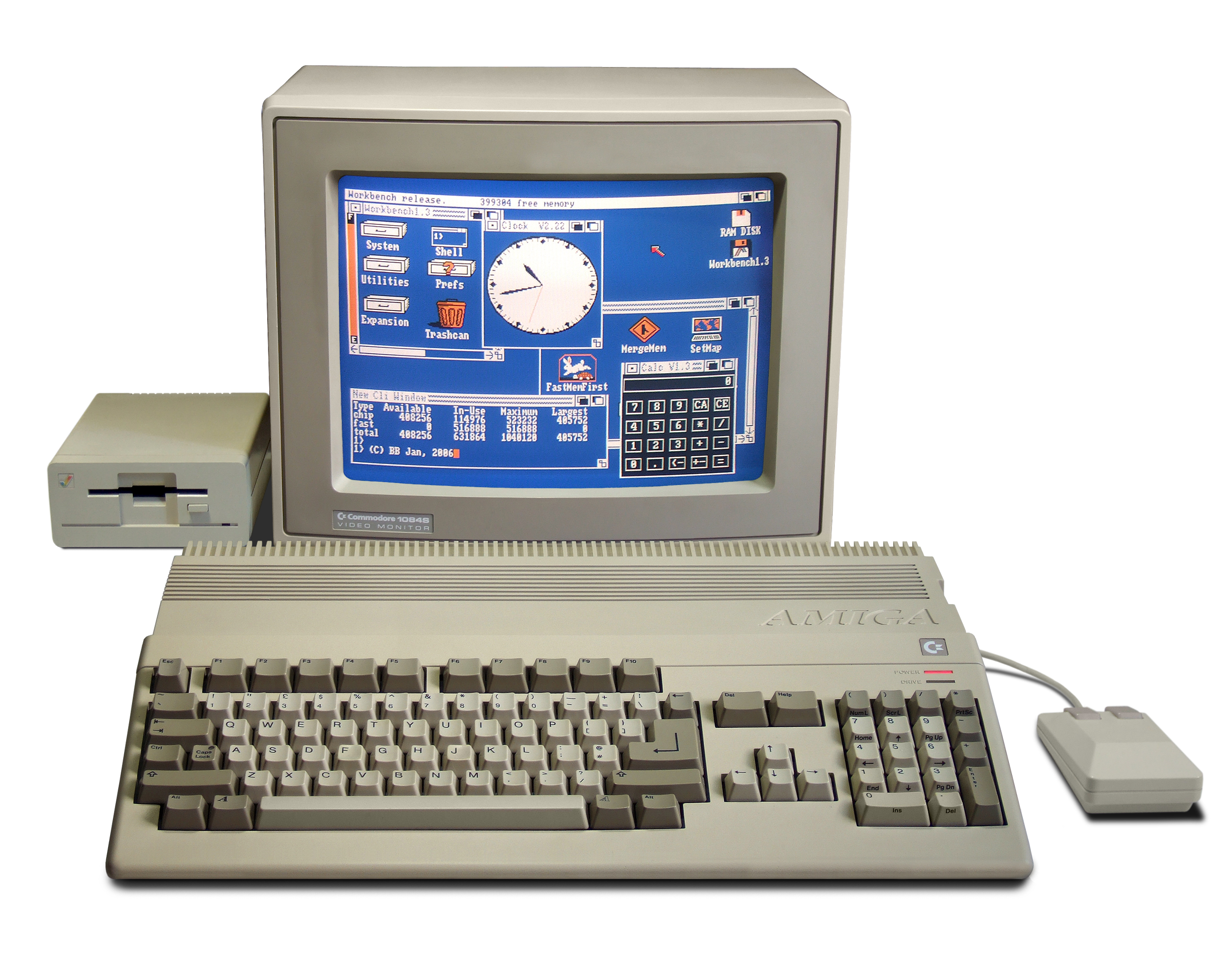
The Amiga 500

The more advanced 16-bit Commodore Amiga and Atari ST machines typically required a full team of developers to build games for; the bedroom coders of the previous years began to fade away as development companies formed to build games on these new systems. First released in 1985, the more expensive hardware and software stifled the uptake of both machines. The cheaper but less powerful Atari ST became the more popular of the two computers; in 1988 it accounted for nearly one in ten of all UK personal computer sales, more than double that of the Amiga. Although chart company Gallup reported in February 1989 that Amiga games had begun to outsell ST games for the first time, the combined sales for both platforms were still less than 10% of the total UK games market. The cheaper eight-bit machines like the ZX Spectrum were continuing to sell well, particularly with parents buying their first computer, with stocks of the Commodore 64 running out over Christmas 1988.

For the following Christmas period, Commodore allowed Ocean Software to bundle Batman, their first game specifically designed for the sixteen-bit machines, with their Amiga 500 computers to create the "Batman Pack". Launched in October 1989 with a TV advertising campaign, it became one of the most successful hardware/software bundles of all time selling over 186,000 units by the end of the following year.

The Amiga's more powerful graphics capabilities enabled game developers to experiment more and helped to expand the demoscene in the UK, which in turn brought in more developers to stretch the capabilities of the computer. A number of influential British companies emerged during this period:

- Psygnosis was formed in 1984 after the closure of Imagine Software, and sought to bring the brightest programmers of the day to produce games that they would then publish, along with other in-house developed titles. Psygnosis' catalog has a number of highly praised titles such as Shadow of the Beast and Obliterator. The publisher was eventually acquired by Sony Interactive Entertainment to develop the Wipeout series among other titles, and while the studio was shuttered in 2012, most of its activities had been adsorbed into the Sony structure.
- Sensible Software, founded by Jon Hare and Chris Yates in 1986, was already a successful 8-bit developer prior to success across Europe with Amiga hits like Sensible World of Soccer, Cannon Fodder and Mega-Lo-Mania. Sensible World of Soccer was the only European-developed game entered into the game canon, a list of 10 video games created by Stanford University for preservation by the Library of Congress. The New York Times called the creation of this list "an assertion that digital games have a cultural significance and a historical significance". Sensible Software was acquired by Codemasters in 1999.
- DMA Design, among whose first titles was the best-selling Lemmings in 1991. DMA Design, after several more titles, would go on to produce Grand Theft Auto in 1997, and would lead them to ultimately be acquired by Take Two Interactive and rebranded as Rockstar Games, with the original studio renamed as Rockstar North.
- Bullfrog Productions was founded by Peter Molyneux and Les Edgar, with one of their first titles being Populous, the title that established the god game genre. Bullfrog developed several other influential titles, including the Dungeon Keeper series, the Syndicate series, and Theme-related titles including Theme Park and Theme Hospital. Though Bullfrog was ultimately acquired and shuttered by Electronic Arts, the Bullfrog team went on to establish other influential UK studios, including Molyneux's Lionhead Studios, Media Molecule, Hello Games, and Two Point Studios.
- Team17 was initially born out of the demoscene, but produced a number of successful Amiga games, finding success in the Worms series in 1995. Today, Team17 also now serves as a video game publishers for many independent studios.

During this period, video game consoles from the fourth generation, including the Sega Mega Drive and Super Nintendo Entertainment System, began to gain interest in the UK. Such interest led to more corporate structure around video game development to support the costs and hardware needed to develop games on these platforms, and caused a decline of the popularity of the bedroom coder by 1995. However, the bedroom coders had seeded the necessary elements as to gain interest from United States companies looking for talent around this time, leading to various acquisitions and partnerships between US and UK game companies around this time.

=== Console systems (1987–present) ===
During the late 1980s to early 1990s, there was a gradual transition in the UK home video game market from home computers to video game consoles, with the arrival of 8-bit third-generation consoles and then 16-bit fourth-generation consoles. By 1991, home consoles had overtaken home computers as the larger sector of the UK home video game market. The growth of consoles in the UK was largely driven by Sega consoles, the Master System (1987 release) and Mega Drive (1990 release); they exceeded the graphical capabilities of 8-bit and 16-bit home computers, respectively, while being more affordable. Computer and Video Games magazine credited the success of Sega's Sonic the Hedgehog in particular as "one of the main reasons for the popularity of" console video games in the United Kingdom. Other popular console systems followed in the UK, including the Nintendo consoles, Game Boy (1990 release) and Super NES (1992 release), and then 32-bit fourth-generation consoles including Sony's PlayStation (1995 release) and the Nintendo 64 (1997 release).

By 1992, Sega and Nintendo were earning more than £700,000,000 or $1,230,000,000 (equivalent to $2,800,000,000 in 2025) from annual video games sales in the United Kingdom, while British video game magazines had a circulation of 1 million copies per month. In 1992, the UK games market was led by the Mega Drive, followed by the Amiga and Super NES, and then IBM-compatible PC. During the early 1990s, Sega and Nintendo dominated the UK video game market, which led to both companies coming under investigation by the Monopolies and Mergers Commission (MMC) for alleged monopolistic business practices.

With the increasing power and popularity of consoles, more UK developers targeted console platforms in the 1990s. As noted above, some of those that were instrumental in Britain's contribution to consoles included Psygnosis (developing Wipeout for the PlayStation) and DMA Design (Grand Theft Auto for the PlayStation). Others included Rare, which brought many titles to Nintendo consoles, Argonaut Software which helped to bring 3D graphics to the Super NES via Star Fox, and Core Design which brought the Tomb Raider series to the PlayStation console. Other software houses, like Ocean Software, Codemasters, and U.S. Gold expanded into console games as well.

=== Video game sales and revenue (1980–1995) ===
View chart definition.
Annual UK home video game revenue in Millions GBP (1980–1993)

Annual UK home video game revenue (1980–1993)
| Year | Game consoles | Computer games | LCD games | Annual (£) | Annual (US$) | Inflation (US$) |
|---|---|---|---|---|---|---|
| 1980 | £33,000,000 | —N/a | £12,000,000 | £45,000,000 | $105,000,000 | $410,000,000 |
| 1981 | £46,000,000 | —N/a | £20,000,000 | £66,000,000 | $133,000,000 | $471,000,000 |
| 1982 | £46,000,000 | —N/a | £34,000,000 | £80,000,000 | $140,000,000 | $467,000,000 |
| 1983 | £36,000,000 | —N/a | £45,000,000 | £81,000,000 | $123,000,000 | $398,000,000 |
| 1984 | £25,000,000 | £100,000,000 | £40,000,000 | £165,000,000 | $219,000,000 | $679,000,000 |
| 1985 | £16,000,000 | £105,000,000 | £35,000,000 | £156,000,000 | $200,000,000 | $599,000,000 |
| 1986 | £13,000,000 | £105,000,000 | £6,000,000 | £124,000,000 | $182,000,000 | $535,000,000 |
| 1987 | £10,000,000 | £110,000,000 | £8,000,000 | £128,000,000 | $209,000,000 | $592,000,000 |
| 1988 | £24,000,000 | £112,000,000 | £21,000,000 | £157,000,000 | $279,000,000 | $760,000,000 |
| 1989 | £47,000,000 | £115,000,000 | £17,000,000 | £179,000,000 | $293,000,000 | $761,000,000 |
| 1990 | £87,000,000 | £138,000,000 | £20,000,000 | £245,000,000 | $435,000,000 | $1.072×10^{9} |
| 1991 | £298,000,000 | £125,000,000 | £22,000,000 | £445,000,000 | $785,000,000 | $1.856×10^{9} |
| 1992 | £578,000,000 | £132,000,000 | £20,000,000 | £730,000,000 | $1,281,000,000 | $2.939×10^{9} |
| 1993 | £547,000,000 | £148,000,000 | £19,000,000 | £714,000,000 | $1,071,000,000 | $2.387×10^{9} |

Annual UK highest-grossing arcade video games (1984–1992)
| Year | Top arcade video game | Manufacturer | Genre | Cabinet sales | Coin drop earnings | Ref |
|---|---|---|---|---|---|---|
| 1984 | Track & Field | Konami | Sports | Unknown | Unknown | |
| 1985 | Commando | Capcom | Run and gun | Unknown | Unknown | |
| 1986 | Nemesis (Gradius) | Konami | Scrolling shooter | Unknown | Unknown | |
| 1987 | Out Run | Sega | Driving | Unknown | Unknown | |
| 1988 | Operation Wolf | Taito | Light gun shooter | Unknown | Unknown | |
| 1991 | Street Fighter II: The World Warrior | Capcom | Fighting | 10,000 | £130,000,000+ ($229,000,000+) | |
| 1992 | Street Fighter II: The World Warrior | Capcom | Fighting | Unknown | £260,000,000 ($459,000,000) | |

Annual UK best-selling home video games (1984–1995)
| Year | Top home video game | Developer | Publisher | Platform(s) | Genre | Sales | Ref |
|---|---|---|---|---|---|---|---|
| 1984 | Jet Set Willy | Software Projects | Software Projects | ZX Spectrum | Platformer | Unknown | |
| 1985 | The Way of the Exploding Fist | Beam Software | Melbourne House | Home computers | Fighting | Unknown | |
| 1986 | Yie Ar Kung-Fu | Konami | Imagine Software | Home computers | Fighting | Unknown | |
| 1987 | Out Run | Sega | U.S. Gold | ZX Spectrum | Driving | 350,000 | |
| 1989 | RoboCop | Data East | Ocean Software | ZX Spectrum | Action | Unknown | |
| 1992 | Sonic the Hedgehog 2 | Sega | Sega | Sega Mega Drive | Platformer | 1,000,000+ | |
| 1993 | Mortal Kombat | Midway | Acclaim Entertainment | Game consoles | Fighting | 400,000+ | |
| 1995 | FIFA Soccer 96 | Extended Play Productions | EA Sports | Multi-platform | Sports | Unknown | |

=== Indie gaming (2010–present) ===
While large British studios continued to develop high-profile games for consoles and computers, a new hobbyist interest arose around 2010 in independent game development. The indie game model of development started to become popular in the late 2000s, with games like World of Goo, Super Meat Boy, and Fez showing the success of the small indie team model and the means to distribute these via digital channels rather than retail. This in turn rekindled the hobbyist programmer mindset in the United Kingdom, starting a new wave of individual and small team British developers. In 2009, the profits of Britain's video game industry exceeded those from its film industry for the first time.

== Industry ==
The UK video game market was worth £5.7 billion ($7.6 billion) in 2018, a 10% increase over the previous year. From this, £4.01 billion was from the sales of software (+10.3% increase over 2017), £1.57 billion from the sales of hardware (+10.7% increase), and £0.11 billion from the sales of other game related items. In the software market, the data showed a significant increase in digital and online revenues, up +20.3% to a record £2.01bn. £1.17 billion of software sales came from mobile games. In 2017, the number of players was estimated at 32.4 million people.

The Video Games Tax Relief (VGTR) was established in 2014 to help support creativity in the UK games industry. According to TIGA, prior to this, the UK Games industry was lagging behind other countries where game developers benefitted from substantial tax breaks and government grants: "Between 2008 and 2011, employment in the [games industry] fell by over 10 per cent and investment fell by £48 million". Thus the UK VGTR aims to ensure the UK games industry's competitiveness on the global stage, promotes investment and job creation and encourage the production of culturally British video games. The key benefit of the tax relief is that qualifying companies can claim up to 20% of their "core expenditure" back, provided that expenditure has been made in the European Economic Area. In 2015 the UK Government provided £4m to launch a games prototype fund, the UK Games Fund and a graduate enterprise programme called Tranzfuser. The UK Games Fund and Tranzfuser programmes are run by UK Games Talent and Finance Community Interest Company (UKGTF) Further funding of £1.5m for the UK Games Fund and Tranzfuser was announced by the UK Government in 2018. Further funding of £8m for the UK Games Fund and Tranzfuser was awarded by the UK Government in 2022.

In recent years, Northern Ireland has made increasing contributions to the United Kingdom's video game industry. In 2025, London became the world's third-largest city by number of video game developers behind Los Angeles and San Francisco.

=== Best-selling video game franchises (1995–2021) ===
Best-selling video game franchises in the UK (1995–2021)
| Rank | Video game franchise | UK debut year | Franchise owner(s) |
|---|---|---|---|
| 1 | FIFA | 1993 | Electronic Arts |
| 2 | Call of Duty | 2003 | Activision Blizzard |
| 3 | Mario | 1981 | Nintendo |
| 4 | Grand Theft Auto | 1997 | Take-Two Interactive |
| 5 | Lego | 1997 | The Lego Group |
| 6 | Star Wars | 1983 | Lucasfilm Games |
| 7 | The Sims | 2000 | Electronic Arts |
| 8 | Pokémon | 1999 | Nintendo / The Pokémon Company |
| 9 | Assassin's Creed | 2007 | Ubisoft |
| 10 | Need for Speed | 1994 | Electronic Arts |

== Media ==
In 2000, Channel 4 produced a documentary, Thumb Candy, on the history of video games. It includes footage from old Nintendo commercials.

== Video game conventions ==
- EGX (expo)
- UK Games Expo

== Game ratings and government oversight ==
Prior to 2012, video games in the UK would be rated through the Video Standards Council (VSC), which had been established in 1989 under the government's Department for Digital, Culture, Media and Sport (DCMS). Initially, the VSC worked with the video game trade group Entertainment Leisure Software Publishers Association (ELSPA), today known as Ukie. The VSC and ELPSA developed a set of ratings in 1993, and used a combination of voluntary suggestions from publishers and their own reviews to establish a game's rating. With the introduction of the Pan European Game Information (PEGI) system in 2003, the ELSPA replaced its ratings with PEGI's classification system. The VSC system was voluntary at this point, though most UK retailers would respect the ratings marked on boxes to avoid selling mature games to children. The only facet of the UK ratings system for video games set in law were for titles deemed to have excessive violent or pornographic content; such titles were required to be reviewed by the British Board of Film Classification (BBFC), a non-government body designed in law to review film and video content, if such a designation was determined by the VSC. Legal penalties existed for publishers and retailers that attempted to sell such games without the BBFC's review. The BBFC had the authority to outright ban sale of a video game if deemed so, though such bans could be challenged. Up to 2012, only two such games had been temporarily banned by the BBFC due to rating: Manhunt 2 and Carmageddon, both which were later cleared after changes had been made by their publishers.

The Byron Review, released in March 2008 under a 2007 order from Prime Minister Gordon Brown to the Department for Children, Schools and Families, made numerous suggestions for how the government could take steps to protect children in the digital environment like the Internet. Among the suggestions were related to video game ratings, which the report found that parents often mistook as difficulty ratings, and instead urged that the BBFC become involved. By May 2008, the BBFC had proposed a new voluntary ratings system for digital video games, paralleling their existing rating systems for film and television. The VSC and other groups felt the BBFC's system for video games was too forgiving and was based on a system designed around linear content rather that non-linear content such as video games, and urged the government to adopt a system based on an enhanced PEGI categorization system they were working on. Reports had found that the PEGI system tended to rate games more conservatively - issuing the game a stricter age rating - compared to what the BBFC would issue for the same title; the VSC stated that 50% of the games rated "18+" by the PEGI since 2003 had received a more lenient rating from the BBFC.

The DCMS issued a follow-up report in June 2009 to address several points of the Byron Review, among which included the intent to standardized video game ratings on the PEGI system. The Video Recordings (Labelling) Regulations act was passed in May 2012 and came into force on 30 July 2012. With it, it eliminated the BBFC's oversight of video games with limited exceptions on excessively pornographic titles, as well as for games with limited interactivity (such as interactive DVD games) and for any direct video content on the game disc. Instead, all published video games in retail marketplaces were required to be rated under the PEGI system by the special Games Ratings Authority (GRA) within the VSC. Retailers were bound to prevent sales of mature games (PEGI ratings of 12, 16, or 18) to younger children under this law, with both fines and prison time should they be found guilty of such sales. The VSC also became the only body that could ban sale of a game in the UK. Ukie continues to work alongside the VSC to help UK developers and publishers prepare for the VSC process and prepare educational and advocacy material to make the UK public aware of the ratings system.

The VSC ratings only apply to retail titles; digitally distributed titles are not regulated under UK law, through the VSC urges developers, publishers, and storefronts as a best-practice to use the low-cost self-ratings services of the International Age Rating Coalition to assign their game an appropriate PEGI rating for the digital service.

== Legacy ==
The Royal Mail issued a limited postal stamp series in 2020 featuring games that represent the United Kingdom's early video game industry. The series featured Elite (1984), the Dizzy series (1987–1992), WipeOut (1995), the Worms series (1995–present), Lemmings (1991), Micro Machines (1991), Populous (1989), and the Tomb Raider series (1996–present).

The interactive film Black Mirror: Bandersnatch is loosely based on the early period of the United Kingdom's video game industry, and makes allusion to Imagine Software, a major publisher in the early 1980s which gained notoriety when it fell into bankruptcy in the midst of being filmed as part of a documentary for the BBC. Jeff Minter, one of the earlier game developers in the UK's industry, has a cameo role within the movie.

== See also ==
- List of game companies in the United Kingdom
- Video game journalism
- The Gamechangers
