= Tehkan World Cup =

1985 video game

- North American arcade flyer
- Developer: Tehkan
- Publisher: Tehkan
- Designers: Shin-ichiro Tomie; Kazutoshi Ueda
- Programmer: Michishito Ishizuka
- Artists: Rie Ishizuka (Note: Characters/Backgrounds); Hideyuki Yokoyama (Note: Illustrations)
- Composer: Tsukasa Masuko
- Platform: Arcade
- Release: JP: 16 January 1986 (Note: After location testing in November 1985.); WW: January 1986
- Genres: Sports (association football)
- Modes: Single-player, multiplayer

Tehkan World Cup, (Note: Japanese: テーカン ワールド カップ, Hepburn: Tēkan Wārudo Kappu) originally released as World Cup (Note: Japanese: ワールド カップ, Hepburn: Wārudo Kappu) in Japan, is an association football video game released by Tehkan (now Tecmo) to arcades in 1986, following location testing in late 1985. It features multiplayer gameplay and trackball controllers. It was released in both upright and table arcade cabinets, but was most commonly released in a cocktail cabinet form factor. Its arrival coincided with the buildup to the 1986 FIFA World Cup. It featured the then colors of several of the world's top teams such as West Germany, Argentina and Brazil, although it did not mention any team by name.

The game uses a bird's-eye view, with the trackball controls allowing game physics such as controlling both the direction and speed of the shot. The gameplay format was adapted from the American football game Gridiron Fight, developed by the same team and released earlier in the year, for an association football game, but with the controls simplified down to a trackball and single action button. It became a major success in arcades, and was a landmark title for association football games upon release. While Tehkan World Cup was not officially ported to home systems at the time, its gameplay format was later adapted by Sensible Software to develop the home computer game MicroProse Soccer (1988) and provided the basis for later association football games such as the Sensible Soccer series in the early 1990s.

In 1990, Tehkan World Cup was ported to the Nintendo Entertainment System as Tecmo World Cup Soccer. The original arcade version was also released for the PlayStation 2 and Xbox consoles as Tecmo Cup in the 2000s.

== Gameplay ==
Graphically, it offers a two-dimensional bird's-eye view of the field that was unique for its time. It has multi-directional scrolling, with only a portion of the field visible on screen at any time.

Its trackball control system contributes significantly to its gameplay, which is relatively speedy and exhibited a fluidity something akin to ice hockey, with as little as three seconds required to score from kick-off. Two-player action can be highly competitive, with players facing each other across the game space while using sweeping arm movements reminiscent of table tennis.

There is a single fire button along with the trackball. The game physics allow the trackball to control both the direction and the velocity of the shot. There is also a mini-map, displaying the positions of all the players.

== Development ==
Tehkan World Cup was developed by Tehkan, the former name of Tecmo. It was developed shortly after the American football game Gridiron Fight, released earlier the same year, with several of the same team members working on Tehkan World Cup. The game was planned and designed by Shin-ichiro Tomie with Kazutoshi Ueda (who previously worked on titles such as Space Panic, Lady Bug, Mr. Do! and Bomb Jack). It was programmed by Michishito Ishizuka, while character design and background graphics were handled by his wife Rie Ishizuka (also known as Rie Yatomi), cabinet design by Kohji Okada, and illustrations by Hideyuki Yokoyama.

Tomie, who had previously designed Gridiron Fight, was a big soccer fan, so he wanted to adapt the gameplay format of Gridiron Fight for a soccer game. Gridiron Fight used similar trackball controls, but was more complex. The team decided to simplify the controls, so that the player can run with the trackball and press one button to kick.

== Reception ==
The game was a major arcade hit. In Japan, World Cup was listed by Beep magazine as the seventh top-grossing arcade game of November 1985. Game Machine magazine later listed it as the third most successful table arcade cabinet of February 1986. It went on to be Japan's fourth highest-grossing table arcade game in 1986 and 1987.

Upon release, David Snook of Play Meter magazine praised the game and said that "most consider" it "the best soccer game around right now" on the market. Mike Roberts of Computer Gamer magazine gave Tehkan World Cup a generally favorable review upon release, noting the "very good graphics" and trackball controls.

== Legacy ==
Tecmo released an arcade successor to the game, Tecmo World Cup '90, in 1989.

Shinichiro Tomie, who was a big soccer fan, went on to develop Tecmo's Captain Tsubasa series of association football games, based on the popular sports manga and anime series. The first title in the series, the Nintendo Famicom game Captain Tsubasa (1988), was released as Tecmo Cup Soccer Game in North America and Tecmo Cup Football Game in Europe. Tecmo later went on to develop Tecmo Cup Football Game (1993) with Sega for the Mega Drive console, before the game was cancelled.

Tomie, who later became the scenario writer for Chunsoft's Shiren the Wander series of Mystery Dungeon role-playing video games, returned to the association football game genre with the Game Boy Advance spin-off Shiren Monsters: Netsal (2004), a soccer game.

Tehkan World Cup was released in 2004 for the PlayStation 2 and in 2005 for the Xbox, in both cases under the name Tecmo Cup.

Stuff ranked Tehkan World Cup the fourteenth best football game of all time.

=== Impact ===
Tehkan World Cup was a landmark title for association football games upon release. It was considered "revolutionary" for its trackball control system, as well as its top-down perspective that allows players to see more of the pitch, and its physics where players control the direction and speed of the shot with the trackball. Its use of a top-down overhead perspective was predated by Alpha Denshi's Exciting Soccer (1983), but Tehkan World Cup was responsible for popularizing the format.

Game designer Jon Hare cited Tehkan World Cup as the biggest influence on the football games developed by him and Chris Yates at Sensible Software. It was the basis and the inspiration for the home computer game MicroProse Soccer (1988). Hare referred to MicroProse Soccer as an "arcade conversion" of Tehkan World Cup, but said it was not "a carbon copy" as they also added their "own elements" to the gameplay. Design elements from Tehkan World Cup and MicroProse Soccer in turn provided the basis for Sensible Software's successful Sensible Soccer series, created by Jon Hare and Chris Yates in 1992.
