= Covermount =

Storage media packaged as part of a magazine or newspaper

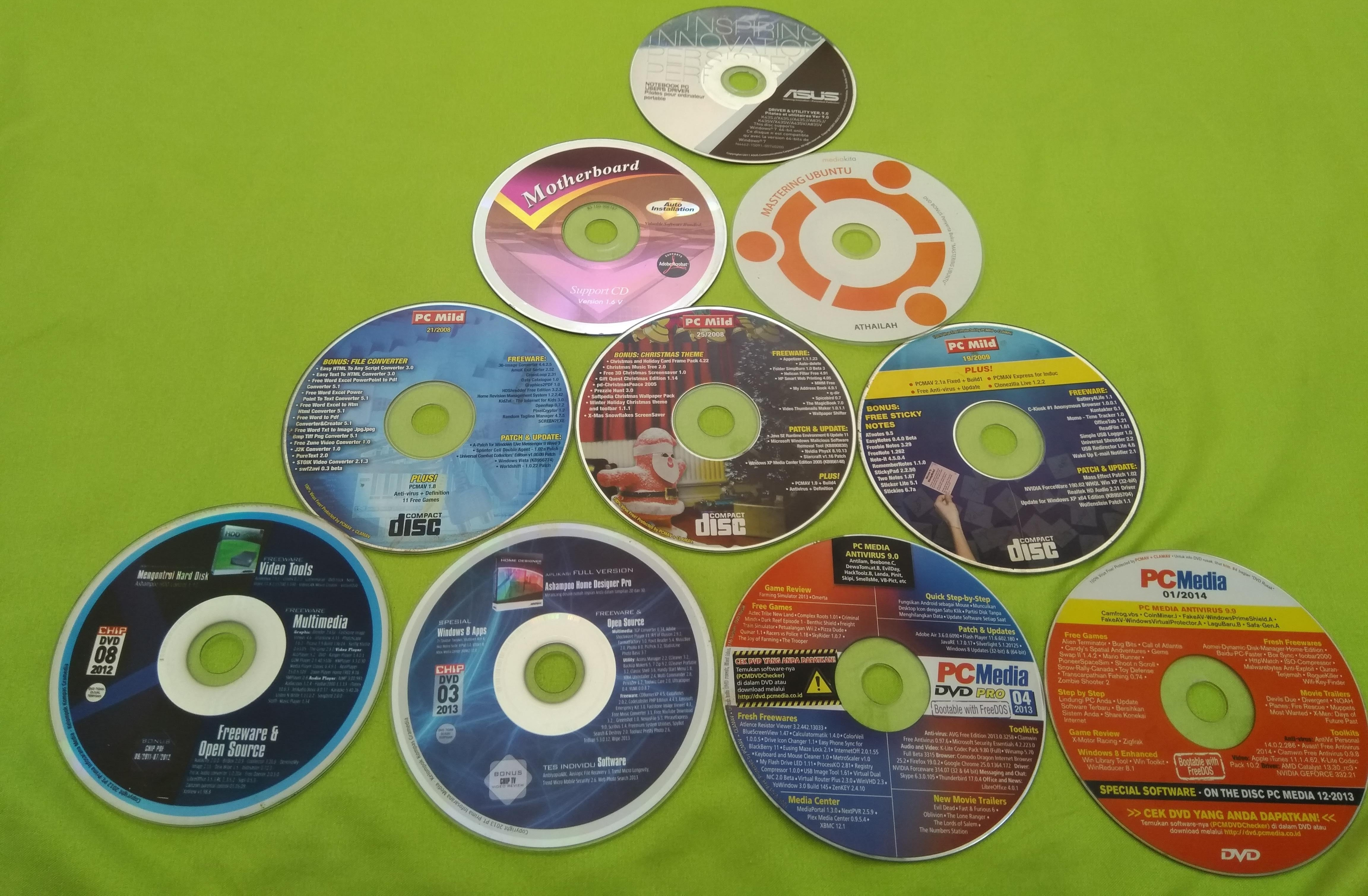
Covermount from computer magazines, they contain both demo and full products.

Covermount (sometimes written cover mount) is the name given to storage media (containing software and or audiovisual media) or other products (ranging from toys to flip-flops) packaged as part of a magazine or newspaper. The name comes from the method of packaging; the media or product is placed in a transparent plastic sleeve and mounted on the cover of the magazine with adhesive tape or glue.

== History ==
Audio recordings were distributed in the UK by the use of covermounts in the 1960s by the fortnightly satirical magazine Private Eye though the term "covermount" was not in usage at that time. The Private Eye recordings were pressed onto 7" floppy vinyl (known as "flexi-discs" and "flimsies") and mounted on to the front of the magazine. The weekly pop music newspaper NME issued audio recordings of rock music on similar 7" flexi-discs as covermounts in the 1970s.

The covermount practice continued with computer magazines in the early era of home computers. In the United Kingdom computer hobbyist magazines began distributing tapes and later floppy disks with their publications. These disks included demo and shareware versions of games, applications, computer drivers, operating systems, computer wallpapers and other (usually free) content. One of the first covermount games to be added as a covermount was the 1984 The Thompson Twins Adventure.

Most magazines backed up by large publishers like Linux Format included a covermount CD or DVD with a Linux distribution and other open-source applications. The distribution of discs with source programs was also common in programming magazines: while the printed version had the code explained, the disk had the code ready to be compiled without forcing the reader to type the whole listing into the computer by hand.

In November 2015, The MagPi magazine brought the concept full circle and attached a free Raspberry Pi Zero on the cover, the first full computer to be included as a covermount on a magazine.

In other places, such as Finland, covermounts on computer magazines never caught on. Instead, popular Finnish magazines such as MikroBitti offered subscribers access to an exclusive BBS via modem, and later via the World Wide Web.

Adding audiovisual media as a covermount has started with music magazines adding covermounts in the form of sampler for promotional uses, using compact cassettes as a storage medium. The cassette was in the end replaced by the compact disc.

Apart from magazines also newspapers have discovered the covermount and started to add compact discs to their publications.

Magazines are also including non-storage media like toys, games, stationery sets, make up, cross stitch kits and whatever the publisher believes will help the sales of their titles.

In the United Kingdom, many television-related "partware" magazines (magazines aimed at collectors which build up to a complete set over months or years) have been launched in recent years, with covermounts containing episodes of the subject show (such as Dad's Army, Stargate SG-1 or The Prisoner).

American musician Prince was known for offering studio albums free with various newspaper publications. His 2007 album Planet Earth was the first to be given this treatment, in the United Kingdom, in partnership with The Mail on Sunday. This caused Entertainment Retailers Association, a record company representative, to decry this practice as 'covermount culture'. His new album 20Ten was released in 2010, in Belgium, under the same circumstances, with the same happening for the album with other publications across Europe. Pop rock band McFly too released a covermount album, which was Radio:Active (their fourth studio album). Other artists known to release covermount albums are UB40, Peter Gabriel, Calvin Harris and Soulwax. In April 2007, EMI licensed the Mail on Sunday to cover-mount 2.25 million copies of Mike Oldfield's Tubular Bells shortly before the rights on it were due to revert to him, something about which the artist was not best pleased. The NME have also had a long history with covermount releases, from the influential cassette compilations C81 anD C86, mix albums like NME Dust Up, mixed by The Chemical Brothers, and Beat up the NME, mixed by Fatboy Slim, as well as albums in which you would have to send a token to the NME in exchange for the covermount release, including Capital Radio by The Clash and Ally Pally Paradiso by BAD II.

=== Demo covermount discs ===
Demo CDs

The initial purpose of covermount discs was to distribute demo versions of video games. Initial magazines, like Amiga Format or ST Format had one or more floppy disks with demos of upcoming games, but the fragility of the media and the increasing size of demos made publishers turn to compact discs, which were cheaper to produce, more resistant to damage, and had over 300 times more capacity. CDs became the most common storage media, but in the past several years, demos have grown from mere 50MB files to 500MB or larger. This discourages magazines from distributing most of the larger demos, unless the magazine has an exclusive distribution agreement or the title is highly anticipated. While in 1997 a CD could carry over 15 demos, in 2005 the typical CD had 5 or fewer. This led some magazines to insert a second CD, or to use DVD media instead.

Covermounts came late to the world of video game console publications. Since nearly all 8-bit and 16-bit consoles were cartridge-based (with the exceptions of Sega's Mega-CD and NEC's PC Engine CD), covermount demos only began appearing in 1996, with the official Sega and PlayStation magazines.

=== Full product covermount discs ===
The trend of offering full versions appeared in the mid-80s, when magazines such as Your Sinclair and Amstrad Action put full versions of software, usually games on their covertapes. These games, provided by distributors from a list of games with lesser commercial value, are also often found in budget range labels, and can range from older but highly regarded titles to unknown titles with little shelf space. Some games or expansions were released exclusively on cover media, such as Moley Christmas in Your Sinclair, or the expansion Populous: The Final Frontier for Populous. As access to internet gaming websites such as GameSpot or IGN grew, so did the importance of having a strong covermount. Others, like PC Format used to distribute full versions of unknown commercial software, with a beginners' guide in the printed version.

Sensible Software made several games for distribution with Amiga Power, like Sensible Massacre (uses Sensible Soccer graphics, where the player throws grenades at Dutch players, following the loss of England against the Dutch in the USA'94 qualifiers) or Sensible Train Spotting (related to the hobby), the last game developed by the company for the Commodore Amiga.

Games redistributed by covermount occasionally have problems if the originals were fitted with copy protection measures. If a buyer tries to apply a patch or update, there is a high chance of the game not recognizing a covermount CD, as they are often reprints and lack the copy prevention sectors.

Software publishers, both then and now, are often against the overuse of putting software on the covers of magazines as they see it is deflating the value of software.

== Price of covermount storage media ==
Although tagged as "free", covermount discs sometimes increase the price of a magazine. Magazines that carry discs can cost as much as double the price of other magazines without them, even if these magazines have more pages. The "free" label serves as a dissuading factor in retailers stripping discs and selling them separately. To prevent theft of the discs from the magazine covers, retailers sometimes remove the discs anyway, keeping them behind the counter to be given to a customer upon purchase of the magazine.

== Problems with covermounted products ==
Software added as covermount to computer magazines may sometimes not be secure. A fast-spreading medium, computer magazines can output over 10,000 discs in a matter of days. Although discs are thoroughly scanned and carefully assembled, there have been cases of discs being distributed with viruses, damaging the credibility and reputation of the magazine. In several instances where viruses were spread this way, publications expressed that while the contents of the media were scanned by anti-virus software, the virus wasn't detected as the virus was too new. In 1998, cover discs released by both PC PowerPlay and PC Gamer were infected with the Marburg virus, which CNN Money stated caused the malware to become a "widespread threat". A MacAddict cover disc in 2002 contained the AutoStart worm.

In addendum to viruses, glitches may be present in cover media that have an adverse effect; In 2004, an issue of PlayStation Underground, a CD-ROM-based magazine, had a glitch where the user's memory card was wiped after executing a demo.

== See also ==
- Disk magazine, a magazine contained entirely on disk rather than a disk attached to a paper magazine
- Volume, a jewel case sized music magazine that came with a CD in each issue
