= Sensible Golf =

1995 video game

- Developer: Sensible Software
- Publisher: Virgin Interactive Entertainment
- Designer: Jon Hare
- Programmer: Jools Jameson
- Artist: Stoo Cambridge
- Composer: Allister Brimble (MS-DOS)
- Platforms: Amiga, MS-DOS
- Release: 1995: Amiga; 1996: MS-DOS
- Genre: Sports
- Modes: Single-player, multiplayer

Sensible Golf is a 2D golf game released by Sensible Software in 1995 for the Amiga. It uses the same pin-like characters as Sensible Soccer and Cannon Fodder. The theme tune was written by the lead game designer, Jon Hare, and a promotional video was directed by Carl Smyth from the group Madness and filmed in Regent's Park, London. The game received lackluster reviews and sold poorly.

A Mega Drive version was planned but never released.

== Reception ==
Sensible Golf was awarded the company's lowest ever score by Amiga Power of 66% and marked a sharp decline in the fortune of Sensible Software. It was to be their last commercial Amiga release, with only Sensible Train Spotting to follow.

In an interview carried out almost twenty years after its release, Jon Hare said of the game: "Sensible Golf is a disappointment to me; I'm not happy with it ... We were greedy. We diluted our quality. To be honest, I was focusing on Sex 'n' Drugs 'n' Rock 'n' Roll at that time, and it was such a massive game. Between that and Sensible World of Soccer, I didn't have time for Sensible Golf, and it just slid".
