= Twister (video game) =

1986 video game

Twister: Mother of Charlotte
- Developer: Sensible Software
- Publisher: System 3
- Programmers: Chris Yates & Jon Hare
- Platform: ZX Spectrum
- Release: 1986
- Genre: Shoot 'em up
- Mode: Single-player

Twister, also known as Twister: Mother of Charlotte or just Mother of Charlotte, is a shooting game developed by Chris Yates and Jon Hare for Sensible Software and published by System 3 for the ZX Spectrum in 1986. It was originally developed as Mother of Harlots but was renamed after a controversy regarding the title and sexualized promotion with skimpily dressed dancers at an industry event, and a planned Commodore 64 version was never released. The game received positive reviews from Aktueller Software Markt, Crash, Sinclair User, and Your Sinclair.

== Reception ==
Reception

Award
Publication	Award
Computer and Video Games	C+VG Hit
