= Sensible Soccer =

- Cover art depicting Ruud Gullit
- Genres: Sports (association football)
- Developer: Sensible Software
- Platforms: Acorn Archimedes, Amiga, CD32, Atari ST, Game Boy, Master System, Xbox Live Arcade, Windows
- First release: Sensible Soccer: European Champions; 1992
- Latest release: Sensible World of Soccer; 2007
- Spin-offs: Sensible Golf

Sensible Soccer, often called Sensi, is an association football video game series which was popular in the early 1990s and which still retains a following. It was developed by Sensible Software and first released for Amiga and Atari ST computers in 1992 as well as for the IBM PC compatibles. The series was created by Jon Hare and Chris Yates, as a successor to their previous football game MicroProse Soccer (1988), which in turn was inspired by the arcade video game Tehkan World Cup (1985).

It uses a zoomed-out bird's-eye view (the majority of games until then such as Kick Off and Match Day used a closer top-down or side view), editable national, club and custom teams and gameplay utilising a simple and user-friendly control scheme. One of the defining gameplay elements was the "aftertouch" feature, which enabled effective but unrealistic swerves. The game topped charts such as Amiga Power's "All Time Top 100". The graphic style of the game was used in other Sensible Software games, such as Mega-Lo-Mania, Cannon Fodder and Sensible Golf. For its innovation and influence on the franchises that would dominate football games, such as FIFA and Pro Evolution Soccer, the original title has been cited as one of the greatest video games by various publications.

A "spiritual successor" to Sensible Soccer, Sociable Soccer, was announced by Jon Hare in November 2015, and early versions for Microsoft Windows, mobile, and virtual reality were shown at nine different public venues across Europe, including Gamescom in Cologne and the London Science Museum in 2016, with development continuing despite an initially unsuccessful crowdfunding campaign on Kickstarter. Sociable Soccer was released on Steam Early Access on 12 October 2017, with PlayStation 4, Xbox One, Nintendo Switch, iOS and Android versions to follow in 2024.

== History ==
The basis for Sensible Soccer was MicroProse Soccer, released for home computers in 1988. It was designed by Jon Hare and programmed by Chris Yates, who adapted the gameplay format of arcade video game Tehkan World Cup (1985) while adding their own elements to create MicroProse Soccer. Hare and Yates went on to use MicroProse Soccer as the basis for Sensible Soccer in 1992, making further improvements to the gameplay.

Sensible World of Soccer, commonly referred to as SWOS, was released in 1994. The game was almost published by Virgin Games, but they insisted on it being called Virgin Soccer. It became a first in video games when it attempted to encompass the entire professional footballing world into one game. Featuring many divisions in many countries around the globe, it featured a twenty season career mode which allowed players to manage and play as thousands of different clubs from across the globe, many of which were very obscure.

=== Next generation ===
The series would make a return in the summer of 2006, with a full 3D title released for Windows, PlayStation 2 and Xbox. Codemasters, the holders of the licence, released the game across all PAL territories, with the design capabilities overseen by Jon Hare, the original designer of the game. Sensible Soccer 2006 was released on 9 June 2006.

=== Xbox Live Arcade ===
In 2006, Codemasters announced a new version of Sensible World of Soccer, developed by Kuju Sheffield, for the Xbox 360 to be released in summer 2007 on Xbox Live Arcade. It features both the classic "retro" visuals of the original SWOS, as well as new improved high definition graphics, and retains the exact gameplay of the 96/97 version of Sensible World of Soccer for the Amiga, along with the music from Sensible Soccer 2006. Due to problems with the game's network performance, the release was delayed in order for "significant proportions" of the network code to be rewritten. After missing several previous release dates, the game appeared on Xbox Live Arcade on 19 December 2007 but was quickly pulled. A statement from Microsoft confirmed that an incorrect version of the game had been made available, in which online play was not possible. The fixed version of the game was released two days later on 21 December. The Windows version was never released.

== Development ==
Reflecting Sensible Software's devil-may-care approach to game design, the developers decided to make Sensible Soccer after playing around with sprites from Mega-Lo-Mania and deciding to use them in a football game.

== Games in the series ==
All versions developed by Sensible Software except as stated.

Title	Year of release	Platform(s)	Notes
Sensible Soccer: European Champions	1992	Amiga, Atari ST, MS-DOS	MS-DOS version converted by Wave Software.
Sensible Soccer 92/93	1992	Amiga, Atari ST, Amiga CD32, Super NES, Game Boy, Sega Mega Drive/Genesis, Sega CD/Mega-CD, Game Gear, Master System, Acorn Archimedes	Slightly improved version of Sensible Soccer, including red and yellow cards. The console and Acorn versions are based on Sensible Soccer 92/93, but are simply named Sensible Soccer. Game Gear and Master System version developed by Eurocom. The Sega CD and Super NES versions were released in North America as Championship Soccer '94.
Sensible Soccer International Edition	1994	Amiga, Amiga CD32, Atari ST, Sega Mega Drive/Genesis, Atari Jaguar, Super NES	Slightly improved version, including slight gameplay adjustments and World Cup tournament. Atari Jaguar version by Glenn Williams for Renegade Software. Known on the package as "International Sensible Soccer".
Sensible World of Soccer	1994	Amiga, MS-DOS	Features a title song "Goalscoringsuperstarhero" composed by Richard Joseph and Jon Hare. The original SWOS contained a few bugs, which led to complaints. A free update disk to rectify these bugs was released in April 1995 (MS-DOS version converted by Wave Software).
Sensible World of Soccer 95–96	1995	Amiga, MS-DOS	Improved version of SWOS. Chris Chapman, the lead programmer said that this was the version they originally wanted to create (MS-DOS version converted by Wave Software).
Sensible World of Soccer: European Championship Edition	1995	Amiga, MS-DOS	Slightly improved version of SWOS (MS-DOS version converted by Wave Software).
Sensible World of Soccer 96–97	1996	Amiga, MS-DOS	Team update (MS-DOS version converted by Wave Software).
Sensible World of Soccer 97–98	1997	Amiga	Unofficial update for Sensible World of Soccer 96/97 (Amiga) created by Gideon and Dom Cresswell and various others.
Sensible World of Soccer 97–98 World Cup Edition	1998	Amiga	Another unofficial update for Sensible World of Soccer 96/97 (Amiga) created by Gideon and Dom Cresswell and various others. Released exclusively on the CU Amiga Cover CD in July 1998. It had the 32 updated World Cup teams + World Cup related graphics.
Sensible Soccer '98	1998	MS-DOS, Windows	3D version, much maligned because it bore little relation to the original game.
Sensible Soccer European Club Edition	1998	PlayStation, Windows	Tweaked update version (PlayStation version converted by Krisalis Software).
Sensible Soccer Mobile	2005	Java ME	Developed by Tower Studios for Kuju Wireless (now acquired by Finesse Mobile)
Sensible Soccer 2006	2006	Windows, PlayStation 2, Xbox	First original game released in seven years (developed by Kuju Sheffield and Jon Hare)
Sensible Soccer Skillz	2006	Java ME	Developed by Cobra Mobile
Sensible World of Soccer	2007	Xbox Live Arcade, Windows	A remake of the game 96/97 version for Xbox Live Arcade and Windows (cancelled), developed by Kuju Sheffield. Added features include a toggable option between the original and enhanced graphics and music (original Amiga and Sensible Soccer 2006), online multiplayer, a zoom function and leaderboards.
Sociable Soccer 25	2024	PlayStation 4, PlayStation 5, Nintendo Switch, Windows, Xbox One	A "spiritual successor" developed by series founder Jon Hare

== Coverdisk games ==
- At Christmas 1993, a free Sensible Software minigame was included on an Amiga Format cover disk. Called Cannon Soccer, it was essentially two bonus levels of Cannon Fodder (one of Sensible Software's other titles) in which the soldiers fought hordes of Sensible Soccer players in a snowy landscape.
- On the Amiga Power Coverdisk 21 one of the demos was Sensible Soccer: England vs Germany, also known as Sensible Soccer Meets Bulldog Blighty. This featured a mode of play that involved replacing players with soldiers from Cannon Fodder, and the ball with a hand grenade. The grenade would randomly begin to flash eventually exploding, killing any nearby players.
- Sensible World of Moon Soccer a free covermount disk included with an issue of Amiga Action magazine in the UK. Play as Moon United, featured low gravity, a cratered pitch and hordes of alien players to trade.
- The developers released a humorous spin-off called unSensible Soccer which consisted of apples vs. oranges instead of men. It was released as a free covermount disk with Amiga Action in March 1993.

== Reception ==
Computer Gaming World in June 1994 wrote that "in the debate over the best football action/tactical game, there is no doubt that Sensible is in everyone's top three, no matter what format ... The game is fast and responsive ... a class act". The magazine added that the "Gameboy version is one of the best games" on the handheld. The Master System version received 88% from British magazine Sega Pro, which praised its playability and the retention of different formations and playing styles.

The Mega Drive version was positively received by European publications. In the United Kingdom, Computer and Video Games awarded it 94%, praising its fast pace, simple controls and longevity, with reviewer Paul Rand calling it "the most enjoyable game I've played on the MD in years". French magazine Joypad gave the game 89%, contrasting its fast, accessible play and extensive customization with the greater realism of FIFA International Soccer; the magazine's staff were divided over which of the two football games they preferred. German magazine MAN!AC awarded it 86%, praising its speed, tactical options and gameplay while regarding its audiovisual presentation as comparatively plain.

The original Amiga version sold 175,000 copies by the end of 1993. Sensible Soccer's first release sold roughly 200,000 copies, according to company founder Jon Hare. He estimated that the series overall had sold 2 million copies by 2002.

=== Awards ===
From the time of its release, Mega placed the game at #1 in their Top 50 Mega Drive Games of All Time. The Mega CD version of the game was #2 in their Top 10 Mega CD Games of All Time in the same issue. Sensible World of Soccer 1995/96 received review scores of 96% from both Amiga Power and Amiga Format, the joint highest mark given for any game by either magazine. In 2017, Gamesradar ranked the game 50th on their "Best Sega Genesis/Mega Drive games of all time" In 1996, Gamesmaster rated the Mega Drive version 7th in their "The Gamesmaster Mega Drive Top 10". In 1995, Total! listed Sensible Soccer on their "Top 100 SNES Games". They praised the gameplay writing: "Sensible Soccer has the speed and fluidity to perfectly replicate all the speed, excitement and strategic complexity of the real game".

In March 2007, The New York Times reported that Sensible World of Soccer (1994) was named to a list of the ten most important video games of all time by Stanford Professor Henry Lowood and the four members of his committee – the game designers Warren Spector and Steve Meretzky; Matteo Bittanti, an academic researcher; and Christopher Grant, a game journalist. This list was also announced at the 2007 Game Developers Conference.

Sensible World of Soccer (1994) received recognition as one of the Ten Most Important Video Games of All Time, the so-called game canon, by the History of Science and Technology Collections at Stanford University.

== Legacy ==
Sensible Soccer developed a lasting reputation as one of the most influential European football video games. BBC Sport retrospectively described the game as a cult classic that "captured the hearts of a generation", noting its particularly strong association with the Commodore Amiga. The Mega Drive version was ranked first in Mega magazine's list of the 50 best Mega Drive games, while the Mega-CD version ranked second among the magazine's ten best games for that system.

The series was further developed with Sensible World of Soccer in 1994, which combined the action gameplay with football management elements and an extensive international database. In 2007, Sensible World of Soccer was selected by a panel of video game experts as one of ten historically important games proposed for preservation as part of a video game canon.

== See also ==
- MicroProse Soccer
- Sensible Soccers, a Portuguese chill-wave band who named themselves after the game
