= Sensible Soccer '98 =

1998 video game

- Developer: Sensible Software
- Publisher: GT Interactive
- Series: Sensible Soccer
- Platform: Windows
- Release: June 1998
- Genre: Sports
- Modes: Single-player, multiplayer

Sensible Soccer '98 is a 1998 video game from GT Interactive. It is part of the Sensible Soccer series.

== Gameplay ==
Sensible Soccer '98 is a blend of quick arcade play and deeper management-style competitions. From the outset, players can have instant matches between random international teams, tackle the Sensible International Challenge against a ladder of twenty increasingly tough opponents, or face off head-to-head on the same computer. The game expands into Friendly matches, Cup tournaments with up to sixty-four teams, full Leagues of twenty-four teams, and hybrid Tournaments that combine elements of both Cup and League play. Beyond these modes, the Custom Teams feature allows fans to act as coaches, editing players down to their physical details and assigning tactical instructions. Multiplayer is restricted to local head-to-head.

== Development ==
The game was originally called Sensible Soccer 2000, but the name was changed to Sensible Soccer '98 in April 1998. Around 16 people were working on the title.

Sensible Soccer '98 was to be released around late 1998. The game was ultimately released earlier in June 1998.

== Reception ==
Reception

Review scores
Publication	Score
Computer Games Magazine	1/5
IGN	4.3/10
PC Joker	33%
PC Player	67%

IGN said " If you plan at any time to actually pick up and play with the teams you've created, get as far away from this title as you can.".
