= Wizkid: The Story of Wizball II =

1992 video game

- Developer: Sensible Software
- Publisher: Ocean Software
- Producer: Jon Woods
- Programmer: Chris Yates
- Artist: Jon Hare
- Composer: Richard Joseph
- Platforms: Amiga, Atari ST, MS-DOS
- Release: July 1992
- Genre: Action
- Mode: Single-player

Wizkid: The Story of Wizball II is a humorous action game for the Amiga, Atari ST, and IBM PC compatibles. It was developed by Sensible Software and published by Ocean Software in 1992. Wizkid is the sequel to 1987's Wizball.

== Plot ==
The story starts after the Wiz and his cat Nifta had restored colours to their world. They were both married (to different spouses, apparently) and had children: the Wiz had a son, Wizkid, and Nifta had eight kittens. All was peaceful and happy until the evil mouse wizard Zark came and kidnapped the Wiz, Nifta, and all the kittens, imprisoning them in different parts of the world. It is Wizkid's job to save them.

== Gameplay ==
The game takes place over nine levels, each with a different style, background image, and music. In each level, the player plays the disembodied head of Wizkid, which can fly around the screen in all four directions. The object is to knock various objects on top of enemies, killing them. When all enemies are killed, play proceeds to the next screen, and after all screens have been completed, proceeds to the next level.

In the action parts of the game, two bonus objects are on offer - a nose which allows Wizkid to juggle blocks, and teeth allowing him to grip them (they can even be taken to different screens - taking a large block onto a screen with only small blocks can be advantageous). The teeth are temporary, but failing to complete a level sees causes Wizkid to lose either item. A bonus "Crossword 2091" screen is sometimes activated by failing to complete a level, in which the player is presented with a grid and a sequence of words, which must be arranged so as to interlock into a crossword-style arrangement. Completion of this, which involves a fair amount of trial and error, adds $500 to the bank balance.

The adventure aspect of the game comes into play when Wizkid manages to collect a whole sequence of bonus musical notes. This allows him to re-embody his head and interact with the background landscape. Items can be bought with money, and must be used throughout the game to collect enough kittens to reach Zark's Castle before Zark can get back. These puzzles often include humorous interludes - for example, on the first level you must distract a vicious-looking dog by giving him a newspaper; moments later he can be seen reading it whilst sitting in an out-house toilet. There is one more mystery task to be completed in order to win the game.

Wizkid uses the "level warping" system from Super Mario Bros. in reverse. Playing only the arcade part only takes the player to levels 1, 4, 7 and 9. Hidden routes in the adventure part are required to access the other levels, and thus obtain enough kittens to complete the game. Level 3 must be completed in "head mode", and it features some of the harder screens.

== Reception ==
Amiga Power gave the Amiga version of Wizkid an overall score of 91%, praising the variety in its gameplay, expressing that it adds up to a "crazy, yet cohesive, whole". Amiga Power further praised Wizkid's graphics, "excellent" sound, as well as the game's "bizarre" & "surreal" sense of humour, calling the game's uniqueness "refreshing". Amiga Power ranked Wizkid the 31st best game of all time in 1996.

MikroBitti magazine (issue 6 of 1992) gave the game 91% rating. Reviewers wrote that the game is highly original and fun but lamented that it is probably excessively strange to become appreciated by wider audiences.

In 1994, PC Gamer UK named Wizkid the 42nd best computer game of all time. The editors called it "a rare gem that deserves a place in everyone's collection, if only because it's totally unique."
