= World Championship Soccer 2 =

1994 video game

- European cover art
- Developer: Sensible Software (Note: Credited under the pseudonym "The Mystery Chefs".)
- Publisher: Sega
- Platform: Genesis
- Release: 1994
- Genre: Sports
- Modes: Single-player; multiplayer

World Championship Soccer 2 is an association football video game released for the Sega Genesis/Mega Drive systems in 1994, as a sequel to World Championship Soccer.

== Gameplay ==
The player can choose between many different worldwide football teams. World Championship Soccer 2 has many features common to soccer games of the time, including choices of automatic defense and attack formations and strategies. There are a number of different game play options and tournaments the player can be a part of.

The game has an option to replay the games from the 1986 and 1990 World Championships.

== Versions ==
In Europe, the game was originally released with a blue-bordered cover in the style of many late (post-1993) Sega Mega Drive releases.

The game was later re-released as part of the Sega Classic Mega Drive series. It is unusual in comparison to most other titles in this series in that it was not previously a high-selling title.

== Reception ==
GamePro gave the game a mixed review. They praised the controls and the addition of features not seen in the first game in the series, but said the soundtrack is weak and the graphics are almost identical to the original's. They concluded "though not among the elite soccer carts in terms of graphics and sounds, WCS II is solid."
