= MicroProse Soccer =

1988 video game

- Developer: Sensible Software
- Publisher: MicroProse
- Programmer: Chris Yates
- Artist: Jon Hare
- Composer: Martin Galway
- Platforms: Commodore 64, Amiga, Amstrad CPC, Atari ST, MS-DOS, ZX Spectrum
- Release: 1988
- Genres: Sports (association football)
- Modes: Single-player, multiplayer

MicroProse Soccer is an association football video game published by MicroProse in 1988. The original Commodore 64 version was developed by Sensible Software and ported to other systems. In the United States, the game was released as Keith Van Eron's Pro Soccer, named after Keith Van Eron.

Designed by Jon Hare and programmed by Chris Yates, they adapted the gameplay format of arcade video game Tehkan World Cup (1985) while adding their own elements to create MicroProse Soccer. It is the forerunner of the 16-bit Sensible Soccer series.

== Gameplay ==
The game can simulate a full 11-a-side game of football on a grass pitch, or 6-a-side soccer, based on the American indoor league of the time.

A single player can work through a World Cup (or Indoor League) tournament, or take on a series of increasingly tougher computer teams. A two-player friendly can be played head to head.

The control method was designed to be as simple as possible, lending itself to fast and flowing football (in the manner of the later Sensible Soccer). A quick tap of the fire button passed forward, a longer hold of the button chipped the ball at height. Pushing backwards and fire did an overhead kick. Pushing forwards and fire took a shot.

Most unusual was the "banana kick", the strength of which could be varied among three settings in the options menu. By pushing diagonally as a shot was taken, the ball would swerve in the air to get round defenders and goalkeeper. Rival game Kick Off would also add this after-touch feature.

Most versions featured a simulated "action replay" after a goal was scored, with the C64 version featuring black & white stripes to resemble a video rewinding.

== Development ==
The game was designed by Jon Hare and programmed by Chris Yates. Hare cited the arcade video game Tehkan World Cup, released by Tehkan (Tecmo) in 1985, as the basis and the inspiration for the game. He referred to it as an "arcade conversion" of Tehkan World Cup, but said it was not "a carbon copy" as they also added their "own elements" to the gameplay. Tehkan World Cup used a trackball to control the direction and speed of the shot, which they incorporated into the game by adapting the game physics for more conventional joystick controls.

Preview pictures of the game appeared in an issue of Zzap!64 magazine, with a plea for a publisher to come forward.

The Electronic Pencil Company ported the game to the Amiga and Atari ST. The programmer created a 6502 emulator, transferring the game code and logic to the 16-bit machines.

== Reception ==
Reception

Review scores
Publication	Score
Crash	90%
Sinclair User	75%
Your Sinclair	82%
Zzap!64	97%

Awards
Publication	Award
Zzap!64	Gold Medal
Crash	Crash Smash

Crash gave 90% for the game.

The game was voted Best 8-bit Simulation of the Year at the Golden Joystick Awards. In the Spectrum sales charts, it briefly reached the number one position before being replaced by Kenny Dalglish Soccer Manager. In the all-formats charts, the game was kept off the top position by Robocop, which had been at number one for a record eighteen weeks.

== Legacy ==
MicroProse Soccer was the basis for the Sensible Soccer series, which was created by the same designer Jon Hare and programmer Chris Yates.

In 2023, a spiritual sequel Tiny Football was released by MicroProse on Steam. The original game is also available on the platform.
