= Comic Bakery =

1984 video game

- Developer(s): Konami
- Publisher(s): Konami; Imagine Software (C64)
- Platform(s): MSX, Commodore 64
- Release: 1984
- Genre(s): Action
- Mode(s): Single-player

Comic Bakery is a computer game for the MSX, made by Konami in 1984 and later a Commodore 64 conversion was made by Imagine Software.

== Gameplay ==
The game is set in a bakery, where the town baker tries to bake and deliver bread (croissants in the MSX version) while fighting off raccoons. Pieces of bread move along a factory line while the raccoons try to eat the bread and switch off the machines. The player is required to keep the machinery running and also scare away the raccoons. If the player succeeds, the delivery truck is loaded with bread and drives off, advancing the player to the next level. Each level maintains the same format as the last, with the difficulty increasing as the player progresses through the levels.

== Music ==
The music and sound effects for the C64 version were made by Martin Galway. The title chiptune has been covered by Press Play On Tape, Visa Röster, and Instant Remedy. The MSX version does not have unique music, using "Yankee Doodle" instead.

The C64 music has also been used as inspiration for the music in the games Jurassic Park (NES and Game Boy) and Platypus (PC).
