= Wizball =

1987 video game

- Developer: Sensible Software
- Publisher: Ocean Software
- Producer: D. C. Ward
- Programmer: Chris Yates
- Artist: Jon Hare
- Composer: Martin Galway
- Platforms: Commodore 64; Amstrad CPC; ZX Spectrum; MS-DOS; Amiga; Atari ST; Thomson MO5
- Release: May 1987
- Genre: Scrolling shooter
- Modes: Single-player, multiplayer

Wizball is a horizontally scrolling shooter written by Jon Hare and Chris Yates (co-founders of Sensible Software) and released in 1987 for the Commodore 64 and later in the year for the ZX Spectrum and Amstrad CPC. Versions for the Amiga and Atari ST were released in the following year. Wizball was also ported to IBM PC compatibles (for the Color Graphics Adapter) and the Thomson MO5.

Wizball's more humorous sequel, Wizkid, was released in 1992 for the Amiga, Atari ST, and IBM PC compatibles.

== Gameplay ==
Commodore 64 original, showing Catellite and Wizball

Wizball is set in the once colourful realms of Wizworld, where the evil Zark has stolen all the colour, making it dull and grey. It is up to Wiz and his cat Nifta to restore it to its former brilliance as Wizball and Catellite.

Wizball is a scrolling shooter inspired by Gradius with an additional collection dynamic. It is a horizontally scrolling game taking place over eight levels, which involves navigating around a landscape and shooting at sprites. However, the aim of the game is to collect droplets of coloured paint to colour the level. Each level starts off as monochromatic, drawn in three shades of grey, and needs three colours (red, blue, and green) to be collected to complete it. The player, a wizard who has taken the form of a green ball, can navigate between the levels through portals. Initially, the wizard only has access to the first three levels, but completing levels gains access to further levels. Each level has bouncing spheres of different colours, and shooting them releases droplets, which may be collected. Each level needs a different colour to be added, which can be composed by collecting enough quantities of the correct colours. On later levels, the spheres of paint start shooting bullets, adding to the challenge.

The wizard himself cannot collect paint droplets, and is initially only capable of very limited movement. The wizard bounces up and down at a fixed rate, with the player only controlling a speed of rotation, and thus how fast it will move horizontally after touching the ground. Collecting pearls (which appear when certain types of enemies have been shot) gives the player tokens that can be used to "buy" enhancements, such as greater control over movement and improved firepower. It also allows the option to summon the companion known as Catellite. Catellite (ostensibly the wizard's cat) that is also spherical in form normally follows the wizard, but it can also be moved independently by holding down the fire button whilst moving the joystick (which meanwhile renders the wizard uncontrollable). Only Catellite is capable of collecting paint droplets and the player has to use it to do so. In the two-player co-op mode, Catellite is controlled by the second player.

== Development ==
The music in the Commodore 64 version was composed by Martin Galway, with input from Jon Hare and Chris Yates.

In an interview from 1987, the developers said development of Wizball was originally started before their previously launched shooter Parallax, but it was put on hold since they managed to code the parallax scrolling routine used in that game. They also said they were trying to present new concepts in a familiar way, and they wanted a company to release it that could give it "a bit of hype".

In a 2006 interview with Retro Gamer, Jon Hare said the idea started as a Nemesis-inspired shooter and it began with the ball and the control method. The ball came first, the Wizard storyline was tagged on at the end. He also said, "Wizball was put together in a very organic way, and not really planned in the way modern games are".

== Ports ==
The Commodore 64 version is the original by Sensible Software. The Atari ST and Amiga versions were ported by Peter Johnson and other versions coded by different teams. On the Commodore 64 version, enemy waves spawn in groups, with four or five on the landscape at a time, at least one of which is always colour spheres; this made the game extremely difficult, but allowed the player to preferentially hunt the spheres if they needed only a small amount of colour to complete their current combination. The Amiga and Atari ST versions spawn only one wave at a time, which makes the game easier, but requires the player to "grind" until a wave of colour spheres is chosen to spawn.

== Reception ==
Reception

Review scores
Publication	Score
Crash	92%
Computer and Video Games	36/40
Sinclair User	10/10
Your Sinclair	8/10
Commodore User	8/10
The Games Machine	87%
Zzap!64	96%

Awards
Publication	Award
C+VG	C+VG Hit!
Crash	Crash Smash
Commodore User	C.U. Screen Star
Sinclair User	SU Classic
Zzap!64	Sizzler
Amstrad Action	Mastergame

The game has been heralded as one of the best ever original games to appear on the Commodore 64. It is noted for its originality and use of the C64 hardware via graphics, sound and general presentation. The control method has also been described as innovative, initially awkward, but adding to the playability when mastered. The readers of Retro Gamer in 2011 selected it as the second best game ever made for the platform:

Quite possibly one of the most beautifully crafted C64 games that you’ll ever have the privilege to play.

The game was awarded a Sizzler award in the July 1987 issue of Zzap!64 magazine with a rating of 96%, missing out on a "Gold Medal". In November the following year, Wizball was selected by the same magazine the number one Shoot 'em Up for the Commodore 64, giving it a rating of 98%. A month later, it went on to be crowned the best game ever by Zzap!64, which Jon Hare has stated is one of his proudest career moments, but at the same time that they were disappointed by the sales of the title, attributing it to the marketing of Ocean Software. In 1993, Commodore Force ranked the game at number 15 on its list of the top 100 Commodore 64 games.

In a 2002 Zzap!64 tribute publication, Wizball via a community vote was ranked the second best C64 game ever with the comment "How it missed a Gold Medal back in issue 27 is beyond us". In a second Zzap!64 tribute in 2005, Gary Penn, editor at the magazine at the time of the game's publication was quoted to say:

Distinctive, distinguished, highly playable, audibly accomplished, witty, challenging, satisfying... As was the case with all reviewer's mood on the day played a part - and I must have been really pissy. It should have gotten a Gold Medal.

The Spectrum and 16 bit versions generally garnered favorable reviews, with Sinclair User giving it a perfect 10 and The Games Machine awarding the Atari ST and Amiga versions 87% and 84% respectively.

== Legacy ==
In 1992, Sensible Software developed a sequel Wizkid: The Story of Wizball II published by Ocean Software. Although the story in Wizkid continues directly from Wizball, the actual games are only superficially related to each other.

A fan remake for Microsoft Windows and macOS, based on the Commodore 64 version, was released in 2007.
