= Sensible Train Spotting =

1995 video game

- Developer(s): Sensible Software
- Publisher(s): Sensible Software
- Platform(s): Amiga
- Release: August 1995
- Genre(s): Train spotting simulator
- Mode(s): Single player

Sensible Train Spotting is a video game by Sensible Software for the Amiga computer. It is Sensible Software's last Amiga game and was available only on an Amiga Power cover disk from issue 53, dated September 1995. Because of this, it is not nearly as famous as some of Sensible Software's earlier releases, such as Sensible Soccer and Cannon Fodder.

Sensible Train Spotting is the world's first ever computerized train spotting simulator. The game takes place at a railway station, with a view looking over the train platforms. Various trains pass through, each bearing a unique ID number. At the bottom of the screen is a checklist of train ID numbers, each of which must be selected by the player as the corresponding train appears. This must be done against a time limit, and attempting to record an incorrect number will result in a penalty. When all trains in the checklist have been spotted, the game moves on to the next level.

== Controversy ==
In 2003, a PC games company called Demon Star released another train spotting simulator, called Train Tracking. The company claimed their game was the first ever train spotting simulator, although the gameplay is nearly identical to Sensible Train Spotting. British game journalist and former Sensible Software employee Stuart Campbell reacted to this by buying a fully registered copy of Train Tracker and making it freely downloadable from his web site, daring Demon Star to take legal action.
