= Martin Galway =

British chiptune musician (born 1966)

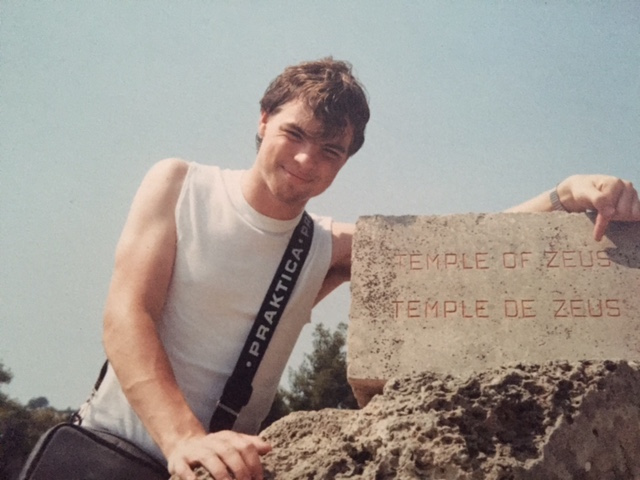
- Martin on vacation in Greece, 1987
- Born: 3 January 1966 (age 60); Belfast, Northern Ireland
- Occupation: Composer

Martin Galway (born 3 January 1966, Belfast, Northern Ireland) is a British composer and one of the best known composers of chiptune video game music for the Commodore 64 and the ZX Spectrum. His works include Rambo: First Blood Part II, Comic Bakery and Wizball's scores, as well as the music used in the loader for the C64 version of Arkanoid.

== Career ==
Galway was the first musician to get published with sampled sounds on the Commodore, with the theme for the Arkanoid conversion. When asked about how he did it, he answered:

I figured out how samples were played by hacking into someone else's code ... OK, I admit it ... It was a drum synthesizer package called Digidrums, actually, so you could still say I was the first to include samples in a piece of music. ... Never would I claim to have invented that technique, I just got it published first. In fact, I couldn't really figure out where they got the sample data, just that they were wiggling the volume register, so I tried to make up my own drum sample sounds in realtime – which is the flatulence stuff that shipped in Arkanoid. ... After the project was in the shops I gained access to some real drum samples, and I slid those into my own custom version of the tune. The one that's in the shops is kind of a collage of farts & burps, don't you think?... Later I was able to acquire some proper drum samples and by Game Over it got quite sophisticated.

Galway was appointed as Audio Director at Origin Systems in 1990. He worked at Digital Anvil from 1996.

Galway's most recent post was working as Audio Director for Cloud Imperium Games on their upcoming PC game Star Citizen, created by Chris Roberts of Wing Commander. Star Citizen was expected to release Q1 2015. Galway has since left this post.

== Video game music ==
- Atomic Protector (Optima Software, 1983)
- Cookie (Ultimate Play the Game, 1983. An unreleased BBC Micro conversion, unearthed in 2002)
- Daley Thompson's Decathlon (Ocean Software, 1984, includes a chiptune cover of Yellow Magic Orchestra's "Rydeen")
- Swag (Micromania, 1984)
- Yie Ar Kung-Fu (Includes a remix of Jean-Michel Jarre's "Les Chants Magnétiques part IV", Imagine, 1985)
- Hyper Sports (Imagine, 1985)
- Kong Strikes Back! (The first C64 song ever [composed in 1984] to use arpeggio which soon became an essential part of C64 sound, Ocean, 1985)
- The Neverending Story (Ocean, 1985)
- Ocean Loader 1 & 2 (The two different songs were used in several games released by Ocean, playing during the loading sequence of the game. Ocean Loaders 3 to 5 were composed by Peter Clarke and Jonathan Dunn; Ocean, 1985)
- Roland's Ratrace (Ocean, 1985)
- Mikie (Imagine, 1986, like the arcade game, this includes the arrangements of The Beatles songs "Twist and Shout", "A Hard Day's Night")
- Ping Pong (Imagine, 1986, ZX Spectrum and C64 conversions)
- Comic Bakery (Imagine, 1986)
- Stryker's Run (Superior Software, 1986, includes a chiptune cover of Yellow Magic Orchestra's "Rydeen")
- Terra Cresta (Imagine, 1986)
- Green Beret (Imagine, 1986)
- Helikopter Jagd (Ocean, 1986)
- Highlander (Ocean, 1986)
- Hunchback II (Ocean, 1986)
- Match Day (Ocean, 1986)
- Galaforce (Superior Software, 1986)
- Miami Vice (Ocean, 1986)
- Parallax (Ocean, 1986)
- Rambo: First Blood Part II (Ocean, 1986)
- Short Circuit (Ocean, 1986, contains the cover of "Who's Johnny" by El DeBarge)
- Arkanoid (Imagine, 1987)
- Athena (Imagine, 1987)
- Game Over (Imagine, 1987)
- Rastan (Imagine, 1987)
- Slap Fight (Imagine, 1987)
- Yie Ar Kung-Fu II (Imagine, 1987)
- Combat School (Ocean, 1987)
- Crazee Rider (Superior Software, 1987)
- Wizball (Ocean, 1987)
- MicroProse Soccer (MicroProse, 1988)
- Galaforce 2: Aliens' Revenge (Superior Software, 1988)
- Times of Lore (Origin, 1988)
- Insects in Space (Sensible Software, 1989)
- Wing Commander 2: Vengeance of the Kilrathi (Origin, 1991)
- Ultima VII: The Black Gate (Origin, 1992)
- Ultima Underworld: The Stygian Abyss (Origin, 1992)
- Strike Commander (Electronic Arts/Origin, 1993)
- Wing Commander 4: The Price of Freedom (Electronic Arts/Origin, 1995)
- The Kilrathi Saga (Electronic Arts, 1996)
- Starlancer (Digital Anvil/Microsoft, 2000)
