= Game canon =

Video game preservation project

The game canon is a list of video games to be considered for preservation by the Library of Congress. The New York Times called the creation of this list "an assertion that digital games have a cultural significance and a historical significance". The game canon is modeled on the efforts of the National Film Preservation Board, which produces an annual list of films that are subsequently added to the National Film Registry, which is also managed by the Library of Congress. The game canon committee includes Henry Lowood, game designers Warren Spector and Steve Meretzky, Matteo Bittanti, and Joystiq journalist Christopher Grant.

== History ==
The game canon project was started by Henry Lowood, curator of the History of Science and Technology Collections at Stanford University. He started to preserve video games and video-game artifacts in 1998, and in the years following, he has noted that video games are something worthy of preserving. Henry Lowood submitted the proposal to the Library of Congress in September 2006, and during the 2007 Game Developers Conference, he announced the game canon.

In September 2012, the Library of Congress had already 3,000 games from many platforms and also around 1,500 strategy guides.

== List of games considered ==
The initial list consists of 10 video games that are each considered representing the beginning of a genre that is still vital in the video game industry.

- Spacewar! – a 1962 space combat video game
- Star Raiders – a 1980 space combat video game
- Zork – a 1977 text-based adventure game video game
- Tetris – a 1985 puzzle video game
- SimCity – a 1989 city-building simulation video game
- Super Mario Bros. 3 – a 1988 platform game
- Civilization and Civilization II – 1991 and 1996 turn-based strategy 4X video games
- Doom – a 1993 first-person shooter
- Warcraft series – a series of real-time strategy game that began in 1994
- Sensible World of Soccer – a 1994 football video game

== See also ==
- Video games as an art form
