= Jon Hare =

English computer game designer

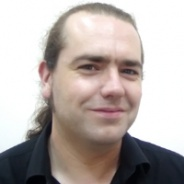
- Born: 20 January 1966 (age 60); Ilford, Essex, England
- Occupations: Video game designer, video game artist, musician
- Known for: Founder of Sensible Software

Jon Hare (born 20 January 1966) is an English computer game designer, video game artist, musician and an early UK games industry executive, as the co-founder and director of Sensible Software.

In 2006 the Sensible Software game Sensible World of Soccer, for which Hare was Creative Director and Lead Designer, was entered into a Games Canon of the 10 most important video games of all time by Stanford University.

Hare has more than 4 decades of experience producing football games: MicroProse Soccer 1988, Sensible World of Soccer 1994, Sensible Soccer (mobile) 2004 and Sociable Soccer 2019, all developed by Tower Studios.

Visiting Professor of Games for Anglia Ruskin University, Cambridge since 2017, Hare has also been a voting member of BAFTA since 2004 for whom he frequently chairs Games Awards Juries.

== Biography ==
=== Gaming career ===
==== 1980s ====
Following a year of working as a consultant games artist on various ZX81, ZX Spectrum and Commodore 64 games in 1985, Hare became co-founder of Sensible Software with school friend Chris Yates in 1986 working as co-designer and lead artist of all of Sensible's 8-bit era games including Parallax, Wizball, Microprose Soccer and SEUCK.

==== 1990s ====
As Sensible Software moved into the 16-bit era in the 1990s Hare took a more active role in overseeing the business activities of the company while continuing his role as the lead designer, creative director, and predominant lead artist and musical composer of games such as Wizkid and the Sensible Soccer series, the Cannon Fodder series and Mega Lo Mania, some of the most popular software franchises of the mid-1990s. Hare and Yates sold Sensible Software to Codemasters in May 1999.

==== 2000s ====
Since the sale of Sensible Software to Codemasters in 1999, Hare has worked in the capacity of a consultant designer on many games including numerous strategy, action and sports games including Real World Golf and Sensible Soccer 2006. Hare is also one of the founders and owner of games company Tower Studios, founded in 2004 with two former Bitmap Brothers it has developed a number of successful titles including mobile phone versions of Cannon Fodder and Sensible Soccer.

Hare has been a voting member of BAFTA across all media since 2004 and works periodically for BAFTA as both a juror and a mentor.

In 2006, Hare contributed a weekly politics feature to UK video game radio show One Life Left.

Hare then became a director of development at Nikitova Games, a games developer with offices in Chicago, Los Angeles and London; and development studios in Kyiv, Ukraine. They worked on several projects for Nintendo DS and Wii, such as Showtime Championship Boxing and the as-yet-unreleased CCTV.

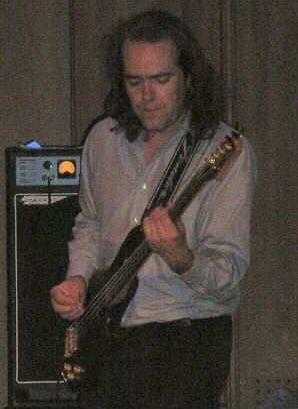
Hare Performing at St Lukes with band SID80s, October 2004

In July 2009, Hare joined Jagex (makers of browser-based MMORPG RuneScape and casual gaming website FunOrb) as their Head of Publishing.

==== 2010s and 2020s ====
In January 2010, Hare announced the launch of a new independent online games publisher, Me-Stars, a games network for browser and iPhone platforms. All Me-Stars games were to feature in game Me-Stars to pick up, win and redeem and interactive high scores and friends lists that appear inside each game during gameplay, depicted by the animated photo-realistic heads found in Me-Motes Messenger (released January 2010). However the Me-Stars games network was never launched and instead became a relaunch of Tower Studios as a publisher on many mobile and online downloadable platforms of classic licensed games from the 80s – 90s as well as new designs from Jon and other game developers. Tower's most successful title as a publisher to date has been 'Speedball 2 Evolution' a remake of The Bitmap Brothers classic game which topped the iPad and Mac charts across Europe in 2011 and was followed up with 'Speedball 2 HD' in 2013 on PC. In 2014 Hare also announced the imminent release of 'Word Explorer' his first original game in 20 years, developed in collaboration with award-winning Polish development team Vivid Games and published through a number of different publishing partners including Mastertronic and Big Fish.

Hare had a six-year tenure as visiting lecturer at University of Westminster, London for "Professional Practice in Games Development" from 2011 to 2016 as well as numerous national and international lectures on games design, business and his career at universities across Europe as far apart as Cambridge, Istanbul, Copenhagen and Stockholm. Following this grounding in higher education in 2014 he launched, in collaboration with Professor Carsten Maple, a network of UK Games Industry Courses and Games companies known as B.U.G.S. 'Business and University Games Syndicate'. The launch event of BUGS at BAFTA featured numerous talks from games industry bodies and endorsements of BUGS from Ian Livingstone and Ed Vaizey MP, the then government minister for culture. BUGS function being to vet and host links to the completed and published games of students from all BUGS universities (approximately 30% of all UK games students) and to make these games accessible to all games industry companies signed to BUGS (approximately 35% of all UK games companies by employee numbers) to help the companies to identify the top games students in the UK and to give the students industry oriented objectives during their studies. Since 2017 Hare has been Visiting Professor of Games for Anglia Ruskin University in Cambridge

In 2013, Sensible Software 1986–1999 a biographical book about Sensible Software featuring extensive interviews with Hare, and numerous other Sensible members and game industry personalities, plus over 100 pages of artwork reproductions of much of Hare's earlier work as a game artist, was launched by independent book publisher ROM. Written by games journalist Gary Penn it was the first and, to date, only book about the computer games industry to feature in the BAFTA library and archive in London.

In 2016, via exhibitions in the London Science Museum, Gamescom and numerous other European games events, Jon Hare demonstrated the continuing development of a new football game Sociable Soccer, developed in partnership with Finnish development team Combo Breaker on numerous PC, console, mobile and VR platforms, despite a cancelled Kickstarter for the game in the previous year. Following a brief debut in 2017 on Steam Early Access, Sociable Soccer went on to become one of the early titles on the Apple Arcade service in 2019, with annual updates for the same platform following, with the launch of Sociable Soccer 25 for PC and consoles announced for November 2024. In February 2025, Jon was honoured with the "Most Influential Person" award at the Debug Indie Game Awards. The award recognised his significant impact on the indie gaming scene, particularly for his work on Sensible Soccer and his current role as CEO of Tower Studios.

=== Musicianship ===
Hare has also been a prolific songwriter since 1982 and has featured in a number of bands over the years as a singer and guitarist, including Essex outfits Hamsterfish, Dark Globe and Touchstone, all of which also featured Chris Yates on lead guitar. Dark Globe was particularly important in the formation of the creative relationship between Hare and Yates prior to the formation of Sensible Software and rehearsed in the house of Richard Ashrowan one of Hare's closest friends since childhood. From 1990 onwards, Hare was also a frequent musical collaborator with Richard Joseph, another close friend with whom he co-wrote and arranged all of Sensible Software's best known musical tracks including the soundtrack for Cannon Fodder the GBA version of which was also nominated for a BAFTA in 2000, and is still the only small-format soundtrack to be recognised by BAFTA to this day. In 1995 Hare and Joseph embarked upon a 32-track soundtrack for the multimedia product Sex 'n' Drugs 'n' Rock 'n' Roll, signed to Warner Interactive, however in 1998 Warner bowed out of the games market and their Magnum Opus was only ever released as a limited edition audio CD. Since 2000, Hare has also written for and performed with a number of outfits including the Little Big Band featuring Jack Monck and Sid 80s featuring Ben Daglish.

Hare is also known for writing the music for a number of Sensible Software's games, including Cannon Fodder, Sensible Soccer, Sensible Golf and the never released Sex 'n' Drugs 'n' Rock 'n' Roll, which featured over 30 tracks written and arranged by Hare and his frequent musical collaborator, Richard Joseph.

== Games designed or co-designed ==
Year	Title	Platform(s)
1985	Twister, Mother of Charlotte	ZX Spectrum
1986	Parallax	C64
1986	Galaxibirds	C64
1987	Wizball	C64; ZX Spectrum
1987	S.E.U.C.K.	C64; Amiga
1988	Oh No	C64
1988	Microprose Soccer	C64; ZX Spectrum
1990	International 3D Tennis	C64; ZX Spectrum; Amiga; ST
1991	Insects in Space	C64
1991	Mega Lo Mania	Amiga; ST; Mega Drive; SNES; MS-DOS
1992	Wizkid	Amiga; ST
1992	Sensible Soccer	Amiga; ST; Mega Drive; SNES
1992	Sensible Soccer International Edition	Amiga; ST; Jaguar
1992	Sim Brick	Amiga
1993	Sensible Soccer 92/93	Amiga; ST
1993	Cannon Fodder	Amiga; ST; MS-DOS; Archimedes; Mega Drive; Jaguar; 3DO
1994	Cannon Fodder 2	Amiga; MS-DOS
1994	Sensible Golf	Amiga; MS-DOS
1994	Sensible World of Soccer	Amiga; MS-DOS
1995	Sensible World of Soccer 95/96	Amiga; MS-DOS
1995	Sensible Train Spotting	Amiga
1996	Sensible World of Soccer European Championship Edition	Amiga; MS-DOS
1996	Sensible World of Soccer 96/97	Amiga; MS-DOS
1998	Sensible Soccer '98	MS-DOS; Windows
1998	Sensible Soccer European Club Edition	MS-DOS; Windows; PlayStation
2000	Cannon Fodder	Game Boy Color
2001	Prince Naseem Boxing	PlayStation; Game Boy Color
2002	Mike Tyson Heavyweight Boxing	PlayStation 2; Xbox
2003	World War II: Frontline Command	Windows
2004	Sensible Soccer	Mobile Phones
2005	Cannon Fodder	Mobile Phones
2005	International Rugby Sevens	Mobile Phones
2006	Real World Golf	Xbox; PlayStation 2; PC
2006	Sensible Soccer 2006	Xbox; PlayStation 2; PC
2007	Showtime Boxing	Wii; Nintendo DS
2008	Casper's Scare School (video game)	Nintendo DS
2008	M&Ms Adventure	Wii; Nintendo DS
2009	Football Superstars	Windows Online
2009	I Can Football	Windows Online
2009	Real Madrid: The Game	Wii; Nintendo DSi; PSP; Windows
2010	Me-Motes Messenger	iPhone; Windows
2010	Shoot to Kill	iOS; Windows
2011	Alien Puzzle Adventure	Nintendo DSiWare
2011	Speedball 2 Evolution	iOS; Mac; Nokia smartphones; Sony Minis
2013	Speedball 2 HD	Windows
2014	Word Explorer	iOS; Windows; Mac
2017	Sociable Soccer (Early Access)	Steam (service)
2019	Sociable Soccer	iOS
2020	Sociable Soccer 2020	iOS
2021	Sociable Soccer '21	iOS
2024	Sociable Soccer '25	PS4, PS5, Nintendo Switch, Windows, Xbox One, PC
