= Sensible World of Soccer =

1994 video game

- Developers: Sensible Software; Kuju Entertainment (2007)
- Publishers: Renegade; GT Interactive (1994–1996); Codemasters (2007)
- Designers: Jon Hare; Sensible Software
- Programmer: Chris Chapman
- Artists: Jon Hare; Stoo Cambridge
- Composers: Jon Hare; Richard Joseph; Jason Page
- Platforms: Amiga, MS-DOS, Xbox 360
- Release: December 6, 1994; 1995 (Edition '95/'96); 1996 (ECE and '96/'97); 2007 (Xbox 360)
- Genres: Sports, sports management
- Modes: Single-player, multiplayer

Sensible World of Soccer (commonly abbreviated as SWOS) is a 1994 association football video game developed by Sensible Software for the Amiga and later MS-DOS. A sequel to Sensible Soccer, it combines the series' arcade-style football gameplay with management elements including transfers, tactics and a multi-season career mode. The original game contained approximately 1,500 clubs and 26,000–27,000 players from leagues around the world.

The game received widespread acclaim on release and has subsequently been recognised as one of the most significant football video games. Amiga Power later ranked it as the greatest Amiga game, while GameSpot included it in its list of the greatest games of all time. In 2007 it was included in a proposed game canon of ten historically significant video games assembled by a group of game designers, academics and journalists for preservation by the Library of Congress.

== Gameplay ==
Sensible World of Soccer retains the top-down perspective and fast-paced gameplay of Sensible Soccer. Players are controlled using eight directional inputs and a single action button, with different contextual actions allowing the player to pass, shoot, tackle and head the ball. Aftertouch can be applied to passes and shots to curve the ball after it has been kicked.

The small player sprites allow a large portion of the pitch to remain visible during play. Individual footballers have attributes based on characteristics such as speed, tackling, heading, finishing, passing and ball control, with highly rated players performing noticeably differently from weaker players.

Alongside individual matches and competitions, the game introduced an extensive career mode combining direct control of matches with football management. A career can span 20 seasons, during which the player can manage a club, select tactics and formations and buy or sell players through a transfer market. Player values fluctuate, and footballers can also be exchanged as part of transfer deals. Successful managers may receive offers from larger clubs or national teams.

The scale of its database distinguished the game from contemporary football titles. It included clubs and national teams from leagues across numerous countries rather than concentrating solely on the major European competitions. Series co-creator Jon Hare later recalled that including leagues from countries such as Argentina, Yugoslavia and South Africa helped give the game an international audience.

== Development and releases ==
Sensible World of Soccer expanded on the football engine developed for the earlier Sensible Soccer games, adding the large player database and career-management systems while retaining the series' simple control scheme. Hare later described Sensible World of Soccer as the best game he made during his career, particularly highlighting the decision to represent leagues and clubs from a wider range of countries than contemporary football games.

The original Amiga version was released in 1994, followed by an MS-DOS version. Updated editions followed with Sensible World of Soccer '95/'96, a European Championship edition released around UEFA Euro 1996, and Sensible World of Soccer '96/'97. The latter became the final major edition of the original game and was subsequently used as the basis for later re-releases.

The European Championship Edition updated the team rosters and added the 1996 European Championship as a preset competition. The MS-DOS CD release also included spoken match commentary.

=== Xbox 360 re-release ===
In 2007, Codemasters revived Sensible World of Soccer for Xbox Live Arcade, using the 1996–97 edition as its basis. The re-release allowed players to switch between the original presentation and enhanced high-definition graphics and introduced online multiplayer and leaderboards.

The Xbox 360 version was released on 19 December 2007 for 800 Microsoft Points, but was withdrawn from the service shortly afterwards because of a bug affecting connections to Xbox Live. A corrected build was made available two days later.

== Music ==
The game's title song, "Goalscoringsuperstarhero", was written by Jon Hare and Richard Joseph. Jackie Reed provided vocals. Hare and Joseph later recorded a new version of the song with Reed for Sensible Soccer 2006 and the 2007 release of Sensible World of Soccer.

== Reception ==
The original Amiga version received widespread critical acclaim. Jonathan Davies of Amiga Power awarded the game 95%, praising the combination of the existing Sensible Soccer gameplay with its expanded management elements.

Stephen Bradley of Amiga Format also awarded it 95%, regarding the combination of arcade football and management as particularly successful and describing it as one of the strongest games available for the Amiga. Rik Skews of CU Amiga gave the game 96%, similarly praising the expansion of the series' football gameplay through its management and career systems.

The game continued to receive high scores in its subsequent editions. Sensible World of Soccer '95/'96 received 96% from Amiga Power, while contemporary Amiga publications generally continued to praise the title's combination of accessible football gameplay and managerial depth.

In its 2004 retrospective, GameSpot praised the game for combining an accessible football engine with a substantial management simulation, particularly highlighting its enormous player database, career mode and one-button control system. The publication included it in its series of the greatest games of all time.

== Competitions and events ==
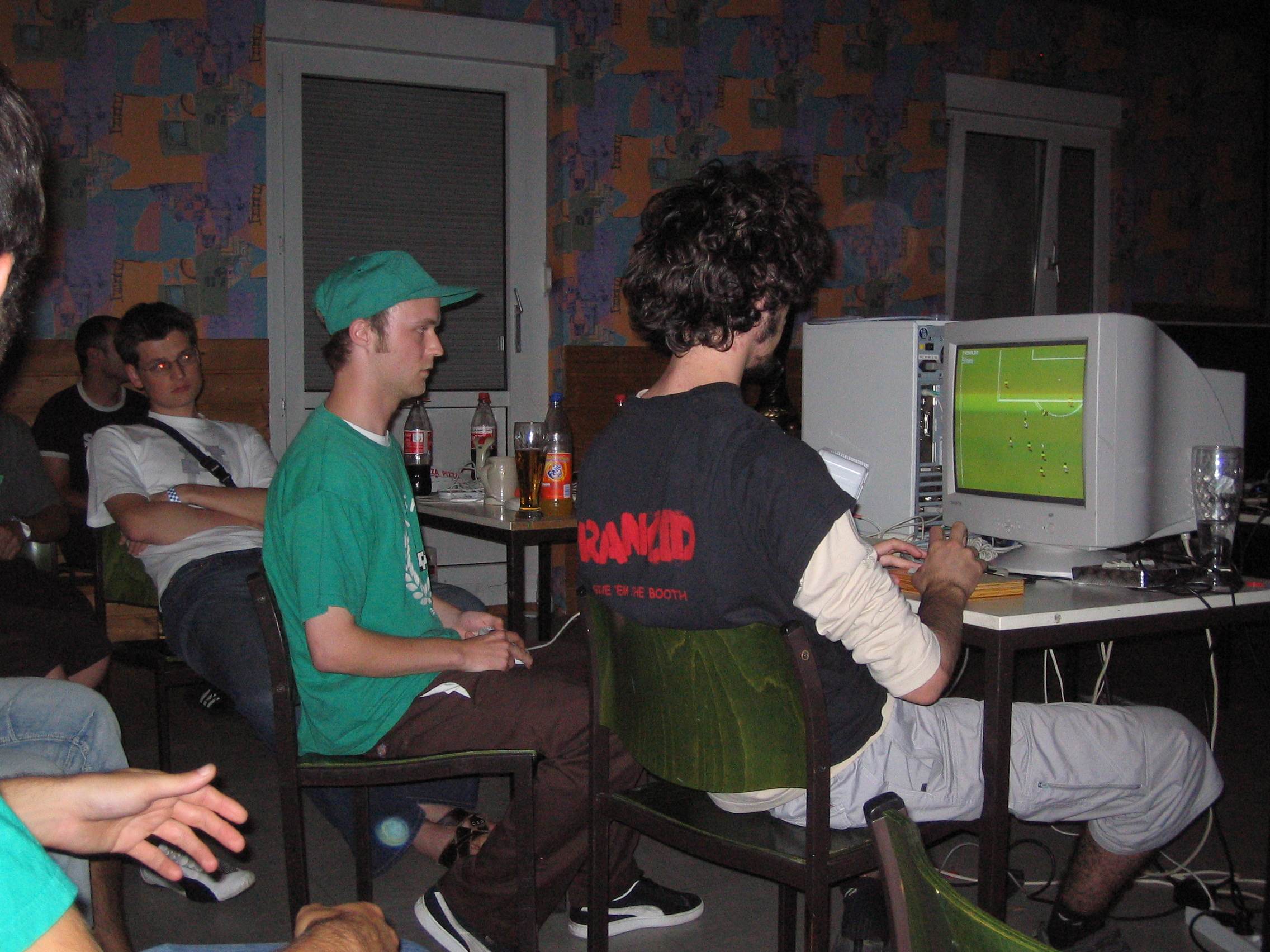
Peter (Denmark) vs. Coolio_Jack (Croatia) at Sensible Days 2007

Tournaments are mainly organized by the fans themselves. Events in the past were the World SWOS Tournaments (WST) of the "SWOS Witnesses" in Serbia and the tournaments of the ISSA (International Sensible Soccer Association) in Copenhagen, Denmark, both played on the PC DOS version of the game. The game is also very popular in Poland and Germany where tournaments take place on a regular basis (Amiga and MS-DOS).

Since 2004 SensibleSoccer.de offers Sensible World of Soccer online play, and national and international tournaments and leagues are being organized and played on a monthly basis. The community uses Discord to organize online play.

SensibleSoccer.de is host of the "Sensible Days", an annual meeting of Sensible World of Soccer fans with international championships on PC and Amiga in the manner of a LAN party. Since 2008, the "Sensible Days" are acknowledged by Codemasters as the official SWOS World Cups. Since then the place of event changed yearly throughout Europe. Game developer Jon Hare visited the tournament in Berlin in 2013 and in Cambridge in 2026.

=== History of Sensible Days (SWOS World Cup Tournaments) ===
Date	Location	PC SWOS		Amiga SWOS	
Date	Location	Part.	Winner	Part.	Winner
2004, 28 Aug – 29 Aug	(Germany) Pirmasens	15	(Belgium) greg	7	(Germany) Obi-Wan
2005, 13 Aug – 14 Aug	(Germany) Pirmasens	11	(Germany) Playaveli	5	(Germany) Redhair
2006, 19 Aug – 20 Aug	(Germany) Pirmasens	13	(Germany) Redhair	10	(Germany) Playaveli
2007, 18 Aug – 19 Aug	(Germany) Pirmasens	42	(Germany) Playaveli	32	(Germany) Playaveli
2008, 9 Aug – 10 Aug	(Germany) Pirmasens	54	(Italy) Lucaa83	47	(Poland) lobo
2009, 15 Aug – 16 Aug	(Germany) Fulda	62	(Italy) Manuel	54	(Germany) Playaveli
2010, 21 Aug – 22 Aug	(Poland) Wrocław	39	(Poland) Foka	32	(Bulgaria) Marin Parushev
2011, 30 Jul – 31 Jul	(Bulgaria) Varna	24	(Poland) Blazej_Bdg	18	(Hungary) Hawkz
2012, 14 Jul – 15 Jul	(Netherlands) Almelo	38	(Germany) Playaveli	36	(Turkey) ALI
2013, 17 Aug – 18 Aug	(Germany) Berlin	46	(Germany) Playaveli	35	(Turkey) ALI
2014, 26 Jul – 27 Jul	(Denmark) Billund	27	(Bulgaria) Marin Parushev	33	(Denmark) djowGer
2015, 1 Aug – 2 Aug	(Poland) Lubin	54	(Germany) Playaveli	59	(Poland) Blazej_Bdg
2016, 20 Aug – 21 Aug	(Netherlands) Almelo	42	(Poland) Blazej_Bdg	39	(Poland) Blazej_Bdg
2017, 29 Jul – 30 Jul	(Hungary) Budapest	47	(Poland) Blazej_Bdg	37	(Poland) Blazej_Bdg
2018, 21 Jul – 22 Jul	(Denmark) Billund	36	(Poland) Blazej_Bdg	34	(Poland) Blazej_Bdg
2019, 27 Jul – 28 Jul	(Germany) Fulda	41	(Poland) Blazej_Bdg	44	(Poland) Blazej_Bdg
2020, 18 Jul – 19 Jul	(Poland) Bierdzany	18	(Poland) Blazej_Bdg	19	(Poland) Blazej_Bdg
2021, 31 Jul – 1 Aug	(Poland) Bielsko-Biała	21	(Poland) Blazej_Bdg	22	(Poland) lobo
2022, 30 Jul – 31 Jul	(Spain) Barcelona	31	(Poland) Blazej_Bdg	29	(Poland) Blazej_Bdg
2023, 5 Aug – 6 Aug	(Germany) Berlin	38	(Poland) Blazej_Bdg	39	(Poland) Blazej_Bdg
2024, 27 Jul – 28 Jul	(Denmark) Billund	28	(Denmark) djowGer	33	(Poland) Blazej_Bdg
2025, 26 Jul – 27 Jul	(Netherlands) Schokland	39	(Poland) Blazej_Bdg	42	(Turkey) ALI
2026, 18 Jul – 19 Jul	(United Kingdom) Cambridge	20	(Germany) Playaveli	33	(Poland) Blazej_Bdg

== Legacy ==
Sensible World of Soccer has been retrospectively regarded as one of the most significant association football video games and one of the notable British video games of its era. In 2007, a panel assembled by Stanford University curator Henry Lowood included the game in a proposed canon of the ten most important video games of all time. It was the only sports game and the only European-developed game included in the selection.

The game's reputation contributed to its revival for Xbox Live Arcade in 2007. The re-release was based on the 1996–97 edition of Sensible World of Soccer, which GameSpot described at the time as generally considered the best version in the series. It retained the original gameplay while adding optional high-definition graphics and online multiplayer. Reviewing the Xbox 360 release, The Guardian stated that the game remained easy to learn but difficult to master and considered it as relevant to play as it had been during its original release.

In 2015, The Guardian described Sensible Soccer and Sensible World of Soccer as two of the world's most revered football games decades after their original releases. Series creator Jon Hare subsequently developed Sociable Soccer as a spiritual successor to the earlier games.

In 2021, FourFourTwo ranked Sensible World of Soccer as the greatest football video game ever made, ahead of Pro Evolution Soccer 6. The magazine particularly praised its longevity, arguing that its gameplay had aged more successfully than many later football games, and noted the continued existence of a community producing updated content for it.

The game has also retained an organised competitive community decades after its original release. Fan-run tournaments and leagues have continued to be held internationally, including the annual Sensible Days event, where players compete in Sensible World of Soccer on both Amiga and PC. In 2023, The Guardian cited the continued gathering of Sensible Soccer enthusiasts as evidence of the series' unusual longevity, noting that organised events were still being held more than three decades after the original game's release.

The game's community remained active decades after its release. In 2023, The Guardian reported that enthusiasts continued to gather for events dedicated to Sensible Soccer, while Hare described Sensible World of Soccer as the best game he had made during his career. He highlighted its inclusion of leagues and clubs from countries that had rarely been represented in football games at the time.
