= Sensible Software =

Software company

- Company type: Private (defunct)
- Industry: Video games
- Genre: Software
- Founded: 1986
- Founder: Jon Hare; Chris Yates
- Defunct: 1999
- Fate: Acquired by Codemasters
- Headquarters: Chelmsford, England
- Products: Wizball; Mega-Lo-Mania; Sensible Soccer; Cannon Fodder
- Number of employees: 6 (1993)

Sensible Software was a British software company founded by Jon Hare and Chris Yates which was active from March 1986 to June 1999. It released seven number-one hit games and won numerous industry awards.

The company used exaggeratedly small sprites as the player characters in many of its games, including Mega Lo Mania, Sensible Soccer, Cannon Fodder and Sensible Golf.

== History ==
=== 8-bit era ===
Sensible Software was formed in Chelmsford, Essex in 1986 by two former school friends, Jon Hare and Chris Yates. They worked for nine months at LT Software in Basildon, and started Sensible Software in March 1986.

Sensible initially released games for the ZX Spectrum and later the Commodore 64, clinching market praise with Parallax, Shoot'Em-Up Construction Kit and Wizball (later voted Game of the Decade by Zzap!64 magazine). At the time, the pair's output was well known among gamers for its high-quality and offbeat sense of humour.

In 1988 Martin Galway joined the team, making it a three-way partnership. In mid-1988, it released Microprose Soccer, its first venture into association football games.

By 1993 there were 6 staff members.

=== 16-bit era ===
Galway left in 1990 to join Origin Systems in the US, and over the next few years the company swapped the 8-bit machines for the more powerful 16-bit Amiga and Atari ST systems, where games such as Wizkid: The Story of Wizball II, Mega-Lo-Mania, the Sensible Soccer series and the Cannon Fodder series became classics all over Europe, especially in the UK where various Sensible games were number one for 52 weeks of the three-year period between June 1992 – 1995. With the rise of the 16-bit home console market, Sensible's games were ported to a wide range of computing platforms, including MS-DOS, the Mega Drive and Super NES.

=== 32-bit era ===
Though Sensible had a strong presence on the 8-bit and 16-bit machines that dominated the late 1980s and early 1990s, this success was not repeated on the 32-bit machines such as the PlayStation prominent in the mid 1990s. The trademark look of cute 2D characters had slipped out of vogue with the advent of cheap 3D rendering abilities and games such as Actua Soccer and FIFA turned to 2.5D and 3D gradually shoving the Sensible Soccer series aside though belatedly converting the game to 3D in 1998.

Sensible Golf, a simple golf video game (not a simulation), did not perform well in the market and with most of Sensible's staffing resources having been thrown into Sex 'n' Drugs 'n' Rock 'n' Roll, a game that had initially been signed by Renegade Software (a Time Warner Interactive subsidiary) was dropped by its purchasers, GT Interactive (best known for Doom II, Duke Nukem 3D, Quake and Unreal Tournament), the owners were looking for a smooth exit.

Though never finished, this final project was discussed in certain sections of the media outside of the game press. It was featured in an Independent on Sunday article in mid-1997. Two years later in 1999, the pre-rendered music videos – created for the game with animation by Khalifa Saber – were showcased within a feature piece on Ex Machina, a TV show covering the CG animation scene on .tv.

Another cancelled game that was being developed during this final development period was a PlayStation action game titled Have a Nice Day, also known as Office Chair Massacre. Though screenshots have never been released, it was a first-person shooter, inspired somewhat by the simplicity of Re-Loaded, a first generation PlayStation game by Gremlin Interactive. Jon Hare has spoken about the project in various interviews, but has never discussed the game's content and gameplay features in depth. Aside from the likelihood that it contained themes as controversial as Sex 'n' Drugs 'n' Rock 'n' Roll, in an interview with Total Video Game's Derek dela Fuente, Hare mentioned that the game had "hit some technical barriers" during its development.

Sensible Software was sold in 1999 to veteran UK games publishers Codemasters and since this date Hare has maintained a close working relationship with Codemasters, designing many of its games, including a variety of updates of both Sensible Soccer and Cannon Fodder.

== Legacy ==
In 2006, the Sensible Software game Sensible World of Soccer was entered into a Games Canon of the ten most important video games of all time by Stanford University. It was the only game developed in Europe to make the list, which also included Spacewar!, Star Raiders, Zork, Tetris, SimCity, Super Mario Bros. 3, Civilization, Doom and the Warcraft series.

In 2013, the book Sensible Software 1986–1999 was released. This comprehensive retrospective on the history of the company was written by Zzap!64 games journalist Gary Penn in conversational style. It features 19 different contributors including extensive interviews with Jon Hare, plus luminaries of the era including David Darling, Dominik Diamond and Peter Molyneux. Chris Yates declined to be interviewed for the book. Half art book and half retrospective analysis, the book is the first of its kind to cover the creative, business and technical issues that shaped the whole era of early games development in the UK and Sensible Software in particular.

In 2020, the Royal Mail issued a series of postage stamps celebrating great British computer games with Sensible Soccer commemorated as a first-class stamp.

== Games ==
Year	Title	Platform(s)
1985	Twister, Mother of Charlotte	ZX Spectrum
1986	Parallax	C64
1986	Galaxibirds	C64
1987	Wizball	C64, ZX Spectrum, Amstrad CPC
1987	Shoot-'Em-Up Construction Kit	C64, Amiga
1988	Oh No	C64
1988	MicroProse Soccer	C64, ZX Spectrum
1990	International 3D Tennis	C64, ZX Spectrum, Amstrad CPC, Amiga, ST
1991	Insects in Space	C64, Amiga
1991	Mega Lo Mania	Amiga, ST, Mega Drive, SNES, MS-DOS
1992	Wizkid	Amiga, ST, MS-DOS
1992	Sensible Soccer	Amiga, ST, Mega Drive, SNES, Archimedes
1992	Sensible Soccer International Edition	Amiga, ST, Jaguar, SNES, Mega Drive
1992	Sim Brick	Amiga
1993	Sensible Soccer 92/93	Amiga, ST
1993	Cannon Fodder	Amiga, ST, MS-DOS, Archimedes, Mega Drive, Jaguar, 3DO, SNES
1994	Cannon Fodder 2	Amiga, MS-DOS
1994	Sensible World of Soccer	Amiga, MS-DOS
1994	World Championship Soccer 2	Mega Drive
1995	Sensible Golf	Amiga, MS-DOS
1995	Sensible World of Soccer 95/96	Amiga, MS-DOS
1995	Sensible Train Spotting	Amiga
1996	Sensible World of Soccer European Championship Edition	Amiga, MS-DOS
1996	Sensible World of Soccer 96/97	Amiga, MS-DOS
1998	Sensible Soccer '98	MS-DOS, Windows 9x
1998	Sensible Soccer European Club Edition	PlayStation, Windows 9x
2000	Cannon Fodder	Game Boy Color
