= List of game engine recreations =

Game engine recreation is a type of video game engine remastering process wherein a new game engine is written from scratch as a clone of the original with the full ability to read the original game's data files. The new engine reads the old engine's files and, in theory, loads and understands its assets in a way that is indistinguishable from the original. The result of a proper engine clone is often the ability to play a game on modern systems that the old game could no longer run on. It also opens the possibility of community collaboration, as many engine remake projects tend to be open source.

In most cases a clone is made in part by studying and reverse engineering the original executable, but occasionally, as was the case with some of the engines in ScummVM, the original developers have helped the projects by supplying the original source code—those are so-called source ports.

Video game	Name of game engine recreation	Status		License	Refs
Video game	Name of game engine recreation	Development	Playable	License	Refs
7th Guest	ScummVM	Active	Yes	GPLv3+	
7th Guest	v64tng	Active		MIT License	
Abuse	Abuse	Completed	Yes	GPLv2, WTFPLv2	
Age of Empires	Chariot	Inactive		MIT License	
Age of Empires	Age of Empires Free Software Remake	Active		Apache-2.0	
Age of Empires II	openage	Active		GPLv3+	
Age of Empires II	freeaoe	?	Yes	GPLv3+	
Aliens versus Predator (1999)	avp	?	?	?	
Aliens versus Predator (1999)	avp_GLES	?	?	?	
Alone in the Dark	Free in the Dark	Active	?	GPLv2	
Alone in the Dark 2	Free in the Dark	Active	?	GPLv2	
Alone in the Dark 3	Free in the Dark	Active	?	GPLv2	
Jack in the Dark	Free in the Dark	Active	?	GPLv2	
Ambermoon	Ambermoon.net	Active	Yes	GPL	
Another World	New RAW	Inactive	?	GPLv2+	
Another World	raw (Rewritten engine for Another World)	Inactive	?	GPLv2+	
Another World	rawgl	Inactive	?	?	
Arcanum: Of Steamworks and Magick Obscura	Arcanum Community Edition	Active	Yes	Sustainable Use License	
Arx Fatalis	Arx Libertatis	Active	Yes	GPLv3+	
Bermuda Syndrome	Bermuda Syndrome engine reimplementation	Inactive	?	?	
Betrayal at Krondor	xBaK	Inactive		?	
Blade Runner	ScummVM	Active	Yes	GPLv3+	
Blood Omen: Legacy of Kain	Blood Omnicide	?	?	?	
BVE Trainsim	openBVE	Completed	Yes	Public-domain	
Caesar III	CaesarIA	Inactive	?	GPLv3+	
Caesar III	Julius	Completed	Yes	AGPLv3	
Caesar III	Augustus	Active	Yes	AGPLv3	
Cannon Fodder	Open Fodder	Completed	Yes	GPLv3+	
Cannon Fodder 2	Open Fodder	Completed	Yes	GPLv3+	
Carmageddon	dethrace	Active	Yes	GPLv3+	
The Castles of Dr. Creep	Castles of Dr. Creep	Completed	Yes	GPLv3+	
Catacomb 3-D	CatacombGL	Active	Yes	GPL	
Catacomb Abyss	CatacombGL	Active	Yes	GPL	
Catacomb Armageddon	CatacombGL	Active	Yes	GPL	
Catacomb Apocalypse	CatacombGL	Active	Yes	GPL	
Cave Story	NXEngine	Inactive	Yes	GPL	
Cave Story	doukutsu-rs	Active	Yes	MIT	
Chaos;Head	FGRE	Inactive	?	GPLv3+	
Steins;Gate	FGRE	Inactive	?	GPLv3+	
Chasm: The Rift	PanzerChasm	Inactive	Yes	GPLv3	
Civilization	freeciv	Active	Yes	GPLv2	
Civilization	OpenCivOne	Active	Yes	MIT License	
Civilization II	freeciv21	Active	Yes	GPLv3	
Civilization III	OpenCiv3	Active		MIT License	
Civilization V	UnCiv	Active	Yes	MPL 2	
Clannad	xclannad	?	?	?	
Colonization	freecol	Inactive	Yes	GPL	
Command & Conquer Tiberian Dawn	FreeCNC	Inactive		GPLv2	
Command & Conquer Tiberian Dawn	OpenRA	Active	Yes	GPLv3	
Command & Conquer Tiberian Dawn	Vanilla Conquer	Active	Yes	GPLv3	
Command & Conquer: Tiberian Sun	OpenTS	Active	Yes	GPLv3	
Command & Conquer: Generals – Zero Hour	Thyme	Active		GPL	
Command & Conquer: Generals – Zero Hour	OpenSAGE	Active		LGPL	
Command & Conquer: Red Alert	FreeRA	Inactive		GPLv2	
Command & Conquer: Red Alert	OpenRedAlert based on FreeCNC and FreeRA	Inactive		GPLv2	
Command & Conquer: Red Alert	Red Alert++ / Chronoshift	Inactive		GPLv2	
Command & Conquer: Red Alert	OpenRA	Active	Yes	GPLv3	
Command & Conquer: Red Alert	Vanilla Conquer	Active	Yes	GPLv3	
Commander Keen series	Keen Dreams	Inactive	?	GPL	
Commander Keen in Goodbye, Galaxy	Omnispeak	Inactive	?	GPL	
Commander Keen in Keen Dreams	Commander Genius	Active	?	GPL	
Commander Keen in Keen Dreams	Reflection Keen	Active	?	GPL	
Creatures	openc2e	Active	?	LGPL	
Chris Sawyer's Locomotion	OpenLoco	Active	Yes	MIT License	
Curse of the Azure Bonds	coab (Curse of the Azure Bonds)	Inactive	Yes	New BSD	
Doom engine games	List of Doom ports	Completed	Yes	GPLv2+, Doom Source License	
The Daedalus Encounter	OpenDaed	Inactive	?	GPLv3+	
Death Rally	DreeRally	Active	?	Public-domain	
Death Rally	dRally	Active	?	?	
Desert Strike: Return to the Gulf	OpenStrike	Inactive	?	GPL	
Jungle Strike: The Sequel to Desert Strike	OpenStrike	Inactive	?	GPL	
Diablo	Freeablo	Inactive	Yes	GPL	
Diablo	Devilution	Active	Yes	Sustainable Use License	
Diablo	DevilutionX	Active	Yes	Sustainable Use License	
Diablo	djavul	Inactive	?	Unlicense	
Die by the Sword	Die by the Sword – Xtended	?	?	?	
Dink Smallwood	GNU FreeDink	Completed	Yes	GPL	
Dragon Age II	xoreos (Bioware's Aurora engine and its derivatives)	Active	?	GPL	
Dragon Age: Origins	xoreos (Bioware's Aurora engine and its derivatives)	Active	?	GPL	
Jade Empire	xoreos (Bioware's Aurora engine and its derivatives)	Active	?	GPL	
Neverwinter Nights	xoreos (Bioware's Aurora engine and its derivatives)	Active	?	GPL	
Neverwinter Nights 2	xoreos (Bioware's Aurora engine and its derivatives)	Active	?	GPL	
Sonic Chronicles: The Dark Brotherhood	xoreos (Bioware's Aurora engine and its derivatives)	Active	?	GPL	
The Witcher	xoreos (Bioware's Aurora engine and its derivatives)	Active	?	GPL	
Star Wars: Knights of the Old Republic	reone	Active	?	GPL	
Star Wars: Knights of the Old Republic	xoreos	Active	?	GPL	
Star Wars: Knights of the Old Republic	KotOR.js	Active	Yes	GPLv3+	
Star Wars Knights of the Old Republic II: The Sith Lords	reone	Active	?	GPL	
Star Wars Knights of the Old Republic II: The Sith Lords	xoreos	Active	?	GPL	
Star Wars Knights of the Old Republic II: The Sith Lords	KotOR.js	Active	Yes	GPLv3+	
Dragon Wars	OpenDW	Active	?	ISC license	
Driver 2	REDRIVER2	Completed	Yes	MIT License	
Duke Nukem	FreeNukum	Active	?	AGPLv3+	
Duke Nukem	ReDuke	Inactive	?	?	
Duke Nukem II	Rigel Engine	Active	?	GPL	
Duke Nukem 3D	EDuke32	Active	Yes	GPL	
Dune II	DuneLegacy	Active	?	GPL	
Dune II	OpenDUNE	Active	?	GPL	
Dune II	Dune Dynasty	Inactive	?	GPL	
Dungeon Keeper	KeeperFX	Active	Yes	GPLv2+	
Dungeon Keeper 2	OpenKeeper	Active	?	GPLv3+	
Dungeon Keeper 2	GLKeeper	Inactive		MIT License	
The Elder Scrolls I: Arena	OpenTESArena	Active	Yes	MIT License	
The Elder Scrolls II: Daggerfall	XL Engine (DaggerXL)	Inactive	?	MIT License	
The Elder Scrolls II: Daggerfall	Daggerfall Unity	Active	Yes	MIT License	
The Elder Scrolls III: Morrowind	Project Aedra	Inactive	?	as-is	
The Elder Scrolls III: Morrowind	OpenMW	Active	Yes	GPLv3+	
The Elder Scrolls III: Morrowind	The Crystal Scrolls	Inactive	?	LGPL	
ELF Corporation	ANISE	?	?	?	
Elite	Elite – The New Kind	?	?	?	
Elite	Elite : Harmless	Active	?	CC BY-NC-SA 4.0	
Escape from Colditz	Colditz Escape	Completed	Yes	?	
EverQuest	LanternEQ	Active	Yes	?	
Eye of the Beholder	ScummVM Kyra engine	Yes	Yes	Yes	
Eye of the Beholder II	ScummVM Kyra engine	Yes	Yes	Yes	
Eye of the Beholder II	ArcEngine	Inactive	?	?	
Eye of the Beholder II	Spectalum	Inactive	Yes	GPL-2.0	
Eye of the Beholder III: Assault on Myth Drannor	Thirdeye	Yes	Yes	Yes	
F-1 Spirit	F1-Spirit Remake	?	?	?	
Fade to Black	f2bgl	Inactive	?	?	
Fallout	Fallout Community Edition	Active	Yes	Sustainable Use License	
Fallout	Fallout Reference Edition	Active	Yes	Sustainable Use License	
Fallout 2	Falltergeist	Inactive	?	GPLv3+	
Fallout 2	DarkFO	Inactive		Apache 2.0	
Fallout 2	jsFO	Inactive		Apache 2.0	
Fallout 2	Fallout 2 Reference Edition	Active	Yes	Sustainable Use License	
Fallout 2	Fallout 2 Community Edition	Active	Yes	Sustainable Use License	
Fallout 2	Vault13	Inactive		GPLv3+	
Final Fantasy VII	Q-Gears	Inactive	?	GPLv2	
Final Fantasy VIII	OpenVIII	Active	?	MIT License	
Fish Fillets	Fish Fillets NG	Completed	Yes	GPL	
Flashback: The Quest for Identity	REminiscence	Inactive	?	GPL-3.0+	
Flood	ReFlood	Active	Yes	GPL	
Freelancer	Librelancer	Active	?	MIT License	
Frontier: Elite II	Frontier 1337	?	?	?	
Frontier: Elite II	GLFrontier	?	?	?	
Frontier: First Encounters	jjFFE	?	?	?	
GameMaker "Classic" (≤8.1) games	OpenGMK	2024-05-09	?	GPL-2.0	
GameMaker "Classic" (≤8.1) games	Game Creator	2024-02-26	?	GPL-3.0	
GameMaker Studio 1 games	OpenGML	2023-04-24	?	MIT	
GameMaker Studio 1 games	DejaVu-llvm	2015-09-06	?	NCSA	
GameMaker Studio 1 games	DejaVu	2023-07-30	?	MIT, Apache-2.0	
GameMaker Studio 1 games	Acolyte	2014-02-07, officially dead	?	BSD-3-Clause	
Gothic	REGoth	Inactive	?	GPL-3.0	
Gothic	REGoth-bs	Active	?	MIT License	
Gothic II	REGoth	Inactive	?	GPL-3.0	
Gothic II	REGoth-bs	Active	?	MIT License	
Gothic II	OpenGothic	Active	Yes	MIT License	
Grand Theft Auto	OpenGTA	Inactive		non-commercial restrictions	
Grand Theft Auto 2	GTA2NET	Inactive		MIT	
Grand Theft Auto 3	re3	Active	Yes	?	
Grand Theft Auto: Vice City	re3	Active	Yes	?	
The Great Escape	The Great Escape	Active	Yes	?	
The Great Giana Sisters	OpenGGS	Active	?	GPL	
Heart of Darkness	HODe	Completed	Yes	?	
Heart of the Alien	Heart of The Alien Redux	Inactive	?	GPL	
Heroes of Might and Magic II	fheroes2	Active	Yes	GPLv2	
Heroes of Might and Magic III	VCMI project	Active	Yes	GPLv2	
Igor: Objective Uikokahonia	Igor	?	?	?	
Imperium Galactica	OpenIG	Active	Yes	LGPL-3.0	
Jagged Alliance 2	JA2-Stracciatella	Active		?	
Jak and Daxter: The Precursor Legacy	OpenGOAL	Active	Yes	ISC license	
Jak 2	OpenGOAL	Active		ISC license	
Jak 3	OpenGOAL	Active		ISC license	
Jazz Jackrabbit	OpenJazz	Active	Yes	GPLv2	
Star Wars: Dark Forces	The Force Engine	Active	Yes	GPLv2	
Outlaws	The Force Engine	Active		GPLv2	
Star Wars Jedi Knight: Dark Forces II	OpenJKDF2	Active	Yes	Custom	
Star Wars Jedi Knight II: Jedi Outcast	OpenJK	Active	Yes	GPLv2	
Star Wars Jedi Knight: Jedi Academy	OpenJK	Active	Yes	GPLv2	
J.R.R. Tolkien's The Lord of the Rings, Vol. I	Lord of the Rings Engine	Active	Yes	LGPL	
KKnD: Krush, Kill 'n Destroy	OpenRA	Inactive	Yes	GPLv3	
KKnD: Krush, Kill 'n Destroy	OpenKKND	Inactive	?	?	
Knytt Stories	knyttds	?	?	?	
The Legend of Zelda: A Link to the Past	Zelda3	Active	Yes	MIT License	
The Legend of Zelda: Ocarina of Time	Ship of Harkinian	Active	Yes	?	
The Legend of Zelda: Majora's Mask	2 Ship 2 Harkinian	Active		?	
The Legend of Zelda: Twilight Princess	Dusklight	Active	Yes	CC0	
Lego Island	isledecomp	Active	Yes	LGPL-3.0	
Lemmings (Windows version)	Lemmini	Inactive	?	?	
Little Big Adventure	TwinEngine	Inactive	?	GPL	
Little Big Adventure	ScummVM	Active	Yes	GPLv3+	
Little Big Adventure 2	LBA 2 Engine	Inactive	?	?	
Little Big Adventure 2	LBA2 Remake	Active	?	MIT License	
Little Fighter 2	Project-F	Inactive	Yes	GPL	
Magic Carpet	remc1	Inactive	?	GPLv3	
Magic Carpet: Hidden Worlds	remc1hw	Inactive	?	GPLv3	
Magic Carpet 2	remc2	Inactive	?	GPLv3	
Marathon Trilogy	Aleph One	Completed	Yes	GPL	
Marble Blast Ultra	OpenMBU	Beta	Yes	MIT License	
Master of Orion	1oom	Active	Yes	GPL	
Master of Orion	Remnants of the Precursors	Inactive	Yes	GPLv3	
Master of Orion II: Battle at Antares	2ooM	Inactive	?	GPL	
Master of Orion II: Battle at Antares	OpenMOO2	Inactive	?	GPL	
Medal of Honor: Allied Assault	OpenMoHAA	Active	Yes	GPLv2	
Mercenary (including Damocles and The Dion Crisis)	MDDClone	Completed	Yes	?	
Metroid Prime	Metaforce	Inactive	Yes	MIT License	
Metroid Prime 2: Echoes	Metaforce	Inactive		MIT License	
Metroid Prime 3: Corruption	Metaforce	Inactive		MIT License	
Midnight Club II	OpenMC2	Active	?	GPL	
The Legend of Sword and Fairy (also known as PAL)	SDLPAL	Active	?	?	
Magnetic Scrolls adventure games (e.g. The Pawn, Guild of Thieves)	Magnetic	?	?	?	
Magnetic Scrolls adventure games (e.g. The Pawn, Guild of Thieves)	ScummVM	Active	Yes	GPL	
Might and Magic IV: Clouds of Xeen	ScummVM	Active	Yes	GPL	
Might and Magic IV: Clouds of Xeen	OpenXeen	Inactive	?	GPL	
Might and Magic V: Darkside of Xeen	ScummVM	Active	Yes	GPL	
Might and Magic V: Darkside of Xeen	OpenXeen	Inactive	?	GPL	
Might and Magic VI: The Mandate of Heaven	OpenEnroth	Active	?	GPL	
Might and Magic VII: For Blood and Honor	OpenEnroth	Active	Yes	GPL	
Might and Magic VIII: Day of the Destroyer	OpenEnroth	Active	?	GPL	
Need For Speed	OpenNFS1	Inactive	?	?	
Need for Speed III: Hot Pursuit	OpenNFS	Active	?	MIT License	
Need For Speed II	Need For Speed II SE	Active	?	MIT License	
Nicky Boom	Nicky	Inactive	Yes	?	
Nox	OpenNox	Active	Yes	GPLv3	
Nuclear War	Netnuclear	?	Yes	?	
Oddworld: Abe's Exoddus	R.E.L.I.V.E.	Active	Yes	GPLv2+	
Oddworld: Abe's Oddysee	R.E.L.I.V.E.	Active	Yes	GPLv2+	
One Must Fall 2097	Openomf	Active	Yes	MIT License	
Outcast	OpenOutcast	Inactive	?	?	
Outpost	OutpostHD	Active	?	Permissive license / proprietary	
Out Run	cannonball	Active	Yes	GPL-like license with non-commercial clause	
Panzer General II	Open General	Active	Yes	BSD	
Perfect Dark	perfect_dark	Active	Yes	MIT	
Pharaoh	Akhenaten	Active	Yes	AGPLv3	
Pharaoh	Ozymandias	Inactive	Yes	AGPLv3	
Prince of Persia	FreePrince	Inactive	?	GPLv2+	
Prince of Persia	SDLPoP	Active	?	GPL	
Prince of Persia	MININIM	Inactive	?	GPL	
Redneck Rampage	Rednukem	Active	Yes	GPLv2, BUILD engine license	
Redneck Rampage Rides Again	Rednukem	Active	Yes	GPLv2, BUILD engine license	
Return to Castle Wolfenstein	iortcw	Active	Yes	GPLv3	
Rick Dangerous	xrick	Inactive	Yes	?	
RollerCoaster Tycoon	FreeRCT	Active	?	GPLv2	
RollerCoaster Tycoon 2	OpenRCT2	Active	Yes	GPLv3	
RuneScape	OpenRSC	Active	Yes	AGPLv3	
RuneScape	Lost City/2004Scape	Active	Yes	MIT License	
Sonic CD (2011)	Sonic-CD-11-Decompilation	Active	Yes		
Sonic the Hedgehog (2013)	Sonic-1-2-2013-Decompilation	Active	Yes		
Sonic the Hedgehog 2 (2013)	Sonic-1-2-2013-Decompilation	Active	Yes		
Sonic Mania	Sonic-Mania-Decompilation	Active	Yes		
RPG Maker 2000	EasyRPG	Active	Yes	GPL	
RPG Maker 2003	EasyRPG	Active	Yes	GPL	
RPG Maker XP aka Ruby Game Scripting System (RGSS)	mkxp, mkxp-z	Active	Yes	GPL	
RPG Maker VX (RGSS2)	mkxp, mkxp-z	Active	Yes	GPL	
RPG Maker VX Ace (RGSS3)	mkxp, mkxp-z	Active	Yes	GPL	
The Settlers	Freeserf	Active	?	GPL	
The Settlers II	Return to the Roots (RttR)	Active	Yes	GPL	
Silencer	zSilencer	Completed	Yes	?	
The Sims	Simitone	Active	?	Mozilla Public License	
The Sims Online	FreeSO	Active	Yes	Mozilla Public License	
The Sims Online	Project Dollhouse	Inactive	?	?	
SimCity 2000	OpenSC2K	Inactive		GPL	
SimTower	OpenSkyscraper	Inactive	?	GPL	
StarCraft	SCSharp	Inactive	?	?	
StarCraft	StarGus with Stratagus	Active		GPL-2.0	
Strike Commander	libRealSpace	Inactive	?	?	
Stronghold	Sourcehold	Active	?	MIT License	
Stronghold	Castlekeep	?	?	GPL	
Dune 2000 Tiberian Sun Red Alert 2	OpenRA	Active	Yes	GPLv3	
SubSpace	Continuum	Completed	Yes	?	
Super Mario 64	Super Mario 64 Port	Active	Yes	GPL	
Super Mario World	smw	Active	Yes	MIT License	
Super Metroid	sm	Active	Yes	MIT License	
Syndicate	FreeSynd	Inactive	?	GPL	
System Shock	Shockolate	Active	Yes	GPL	
System Shock	TSSHP (The System Shock Hack Project)	Inactive	?	BSD	
S.T.A.L.K.E.R.: Shadow of Chernobyl	OpenXRay (in fact not a reimpl, but just a release)	Active		non-commercial	
S.T.A.L.K.E.R.: Clear Sky	OpenXRay (in fact not a reimpl, but just a release)	Active		non-commercial	
S.T.A.L.K.E.R.: Call of Pripyat	OpenXRay (in fact not a reimpl, but just a release)	Active	Yes	non-commercial	
The Temple of Elemental Evil	Temple+	Active	Yes	?	
Theme Hospital	CorsixTH	Active	Yes	MIT License	
Titus the Fox	OpenTitus	Inactive	Yes	GPL	
Tomb Raider classic series	TRX – Tomb Raider I & II: Community Edition	Active	Yes	GPLv3	
Tomb Raider classic series	CroftEngine	Active	Yes	LGPL	
Tomb Raider classic series	OpenRaider	Inactive	?	GPL-2.0	
Tomb Raider classic series	OpenTomb	Inactive	Yes	LGPL	
Tomb Raider classic series	OpenLara	Active	Yes	BSD	
Tomb Raider classic series	Tomb Raider 5 Decompilation Project	Active	?	?	
Tomb Raider classic series	TombEngine	Active	Yes	MIT License	
Total Annihilation	Spring Engine (with eXtended Total Annihilation, Balanced Annihilation or Beyond All Reason)	Active	Yes	GPL	
Total Annihilation	Total Annihilation 3D	Completed	?	?	
Touhou 6 ~ The Embodiment of Scarlet Devil	PyTouhou	?	Yes	GPL	
Transport Tycoon Deluxe	OpenTTD (reverse engineered)	Active	Yes	GPL	
Tyrian	OpenTyrian	Active	Yes	GPL-2.0	
freescape engine used for games like Driller and Castle Master	Phantasma	?	?	?	
Dungeon Master, Chaos Strikes Back, and Dungeon Master II	Chaos Strikes Back for Windows (and Linux, MacOS X, Pocket PC) (reverse engineered)	Completed	Yes	?	
Dungeon Master, Chaos Strikes Back, and Dungeon Master II	RTC	?	Yes	?	
GoldSrc (Half-Life 1) games	Xash3D FWGS	Active	Yes	GPLv3	
Key dating sim games	Waffle	?	?	?	
adventure games created with World Builder	ScummVM (WAGE)	?	?	GPL	
Key ren'ai games using the AVG32 engine, especially Kanon, Air and Clannad	xkanon	Inactive	?	GPL	
Key ren'ai games using the AVG32 engine, especially Kanon, Air and Clannad	RLVM	Active	Yes	GPL	
Adventure Game Interpreter (AGI) engine by Sierra adventure games	NAGI	?	?	?	
Adventure Game Interpreter (AGI) engine, Cinématique, Gob, Groovie, Kyra	ScummVM; ScummVM-supported games	?	Yes	GPL	
Multimedia Applications Development Environment (MADE engine)	ScummVM; ScummVM-supported games	?	Yes	GPL	
SCUMM	ScummVM; ScummVM-supported games	?	Yes	GPL	
Sierra's Creative Interpreter (SCI)	ScummVM; ScummVM-supported games	?	Yes	GPL	
M4, Parallaction, and others	ScummVM; ScummVM-supported games	?	Yes	GPL	
Grim Fandango (GrimE-based)	ResidualVM ScummVM	?	Yes	GPL	
Escape from Monkey Island	ResidualVM ScummVM	?	Yes	GPL	
Myst III: Exile	ResidualVM ScummVM	?	Yes	GPL	
The Longest Journey	ResidualVM ScummVM	Active	Yes	GPL	
Baldur's Gate (Infinity Engine-based)	GemRB	Active	Yes	GPL	
Baldur's Gate II: Shadows of Amn	GemRB	Active	Yes	GPL	
Icewind Dale	GemRB	Active	Yes	GPL	
Icewind Dale II	GemRB	Active	Yes	GPL	
Planescape: Torment	GemRB	Active	Yes	GPL	
Plants vs. Zombies	PlantsVsZombies.NET	Active	Yes	MIT License	
System Shock 2	OpenDarkEngine (i.e., not The Dark Mod), NewDark	Inactive	Yes	GPL	
Thief: The Dark Project (Dark Engine-based)	OpenDarkEngine (i.e., not The Dark Mod), NewDark	Inactive	Yes	GPL	
Thief II: The Metal Age	OpenDarkEngine (i.e., not The Dark Mod), NewDark	Inactive	Yes	GPL	
UFO: Enemy Unknown	OpenXcom	Completed	Yes	GPL	
X-COM: Terror from the Deep	OpenXcom	Completed	Yes	GPL	
X-COM: Apocalypse	OpenApoc	Active	Yes	MIT License	
Ultima I	Open Sosaria	Active		MIT License	
Ultima IV: Quest of the Avatar	xu4	Inactive	Yes	GPL	
Ultima IV: Quest of the Avatar	ScummVM	Active	Yes	GPL	
Ultima VI: The False Prophet	Nuvie	Inactive	Yes	GPL	
Ultima VI: The False Prophet	ScummVM	Active	Yes	GPL	
Ultima VII: The Black Gate	Exult Ultima VII: Revisited	Active	Yes	GPL	
Ultima VII Part Two: Serpent Isle	Exult Ultima VII: Revisited	Active		BSD-2-Clause	
Ultima VIII: Pagan	Pentagram	Inactive	Yes	GPL	
Ultima VIII: Pagan	ScummVM	Active	Yes	GPL	
Ultima Online	CrossUO	Active	?	GPL	
Ultima Online on Freeshards	Iris2	?	?	?	
Ultima Underworld: The Stygian Abyss	Underworld Adventures	Active	?	GPL	
Ultima Underworld: The Stygian Abyss	UnderworldGodot	Active	?	MIT	
Unreal	Surreal Engine	Active	Yes	zlib License	
Unreal Tournament	Surreal Engine	Active	Yes	zlib License	
Urban Assault	UA_source	Active	Yes	GPL	
Warcraft: Orcs & Humans	Alpha-WC1	?	?	?	
Warcraft: Orcs & Humans	War1gus with Stratagus	Active	Yes	GPL-2.0-only	
Warcraft II: Tides of Darkness	Wargus with Stratagus	Active	Yes	GPL-2.0-only	
Wizardry	p-interp	?	?	?	
World of Warcraft	benilla (version 1.12.1)	Active	Yes	Apache-2.0 or MIT License	
World of Warcraft	Benilla-Wotlk (version 3.3.5a)	Active		Apache-2.0 or MIT License	
World of Warcraft	pseuwow (versions 1.12.2, 2.4.3 and 3.3.5a)	Inactive	?	GPLv2+	
World of Warcraft	whoa (version 3.3.5a)	Active		Public domain	
World of Warcraft	wowdecomp (versions 3.3.5a and 4.3.4)	Active	Yes	?	
World of Warcraft	WoWee (versions 1.12.1, 2.4.3 and 3.3.5a)	Active	Yes	MIT License with non-commercial restriction	
World of Warcraft	Wowser (version 3.3.5a)	Inactive	?	MIT License	
Z-machine	Frotz, ZIP, JZIP, Zip 2000, Zip Infinity and Nitfol	?	?	?	
Z-machine	ScummVM	Active	Yes	GPL	
Zak McKracken and the Alien Mindbenders	ScummVM	Active	Yes	GPL	
Zork Nemesis	ScummVM	Active	Yes	GPL	
Zork: Grand Inquisitor	ScummVM	Active	Yes	GPL	
Video game	Name of game engine recreation	Development	Playable	License	Refs
Video game	Name of game engine recreation	Status		License	Refs

== See also ==
- List of commercial video games with later released source code
- Source port
- Video game remake
- Emulator
