= Cannon Fodder =

- Logo
- Genres: Shoot 'em up, real-time tactics
- Developer: Sensible Software
- Publishers: Virgin Interactive; Codemasters
- Platforms: 3DO, Archimedes, Amiga, Amiga CD32, Jaguar, Atari ST, MS-DOS, Game Boy Color, Genesis, Super NES, Windows

Cannon Fodder is a series of war (and later science fiction) themed action games developed by Sensible Software, initially released as Cannon Fodder for the Amiga. Only two games in the series were created by Sensible, but were converted to most active systems at the time of release. A sequel, Cannon Fodder 2, was released in 1994 for Amiga and MS-DOS. A third game, Cannon Fodder 3, was made by a Russian developer and released in English in 2012.

== History ==
Cannon Fodder was designed by Jon Hare, co-founder of Sensible Software, and released in 1993 on a variety of platforms. Stuart Cambridge was lead art director on the game and worked with a 16-color palette.

== Gameplay ==
Screenshot of an early mission

The player is in charge of a squad of between one and eight men that can be, for command purposes, split up to three groups (referred to as Snake, Eagle and Panther squads). All men have a machine gun with unlimited ammunition, as well as limited caches of grenades and rockets that can be found on the map. In later levels, the player is provided with some grenades and rockets at the start of the mission. The player's machine guns do not harm its own soldiers, but friendly fire from grenades and rockets is possible, which are also the only weapons capable of destroying buildings and vehicles. Men can also die if hit by debris flung from exploding buildings and vehicles, get caught in man-traps, mired in quicksand, and hit by enemy fire. Men usually walk, but several vehicles are available in some missions.

The games are split into several missions, which are usually sub-divided into phases. Dead soldiers are replaced by new ones at the start of each phase. Each soldier that survives a mission is promoted and receives a small increase in the rate of fire, accuracy, and range. The player is only able to save the game upon completion of a whole mission. Each phase is structured around mission objectives which range from "Kill all enemies" or "Destroy enemy buildings" to "Rescue all hostages". Some phases are complex, and require the player to use their imagination, pre-planning and strategy. For example, players may have to split their team into two or more groups and leave one group to defend an area or route, assigning its control to the game's artificial intelligence, while taking control of another group.

The pre-mission screen shows a hill with a grave for each dead soldier, with recruits lining up in front of it and a sports-like score at the top of the screen. Soldiers each have unique names, while on the grand scale of things being nothing more than interchangeable cannon fodder. The game has hundreds of individually named recruits, of which the first few—Jools, Jops, Stoo and Rj—were named directly after the development staff. As each recruit is killed in battle, he receives a tombstone on the hill and the next recruit in line takes his place.

Cannon Fodder 2 introduced a variety of new settings: a Middle Eastern conflict, an alien planet and spacecraft, the medieval and gangster-themed Chicago. It nevertheless retained the same mechanics and gameplay. In the new settings, troops wielding grenades and rockets were replaced by such units as aliens and wizards, but nonetheless behaved in the same manner, as did battering rams representing trucks and so forth. The game was more difficult than its predecessor, employing puzzle elements such as multiple ways—of varying effectiveness—to solve levels. It featured reduced use of water obstacles but retained mines and booby traps.

Cannon Fodder 3 featured a military, counter-terrorism theme with more advanced weather settings. It retained grenades and rockets as the central secondary weapons and introduced further power-ups. It expanded the selection of vehicles and added further enemy installations such as sniper towers. It also features an online cooperative mode.

== Music video ==
The theme tune for the game ("War!") was written by the lead game designer Jon Hare, with musician Richard Joseph. Vocals were sung by Hare himself. A music video of the song was put together to promote the original release.

Shot over just one day and for a total budget of £500, it featured the entire team dressed up in military uniforms, an assortment of masks (including one of Mario and Donald Duck) and toy guns. The version of the music track is more complete than the one that appeared on the 16-bit versions and was recorded professionally. In fact, the menu screen track is also a pared down version of a proper song, featuring studio-standard vocals. Both of these tracks were written and performed by Jon Hare, as were many of the other songs featured in Sensible's games.

== Games ==
=== Cannon Fodder ===
New recruits queue near the tombstones.

Production of Cannon Fodder began following the completion of the successful strategy game Mega Lo Mania. Sensible Software wanted to create another strategy game featuring mouse control and the notion of sending troops on missions, but with more action than had been used in Mega Lo Mania. Production began in 1991 but was slowed due to Mega Drive conversions of other games. Cannon Fodder lost its provisional publisher in the aftermath of owner Robert Maxwell's death. As development work resumed, the team gradually reduced the complexity the strategy gameplay in favour of more direct control and action gameplay. In May 1993, Sensible Software found a new publisher in Virgin Interactive, which released the game in November of that year.

Amiga magazines rated the game positively, widely awarding scores of over 90%, while Amiga Action awarded an unprecedented score, calling it the best game of the year. Critics praised the fun, addictiveness, music and humour of the game. The game also drew criticism in the Daily Star for its juxtaposition of war and humour and its use of iconography closely resembling the remembrance poppy.

==== Ports ====
Once Sensible Software was sold off to Codemasters, the decision was taken to port the game over to the Game Boy Color. The limit on having two men in your squad and a much smaller playing area meant changes had to be made to the gameplay, mainly to make it easier. Jon Hare described the change as converting "11-a-side football to 5-a-side football".

In 2004, Jon Hare set up a small mobile phone games team known as Tower Studios. Their first release was Sensible Soccer in 2004, followed by Cannon Fodder in 2005. Both titles were published by Kuju Entertainment. The games were only playable on certain color models and, due to many keypads' inability to register a diagonal movement, the control systems for both games had to be radically redesigned.

=== Cannon Soccer ===
In 1994, a free minigame called Cannon Soccer (or Cannon Fodder - Amiga Format Christmas Special) was included on the coverdisk of the Amiga Format Christmas issue. It was essentially two bonus levels of Cannon Fodder in which the soldiers fought hordes of Sensible Soccer players in a snowy landscape. The levels were titled "Land of Hope and Glory", and "It's Snow Time".

=== Sensible Soccer 92/93 Meets Bulldog Blighty ===
One of the demos on the Amiga Power cover disk 21 was Sensible Soccer Meets Bulldog Blighty. It featured a mode of play that involved replacing players with soldiers from Cannon Fodder and the ball with a hand grenade. The grenade would randomly begin to flash and would eventually explode after a few minutes, killing any nearby players. The magazine described it as a "1944 version of Sensible Soccer", though The Daily Telegraph compared it to the Christmas-time football match in 1914.

=== Cannon Fodder 2 ===
Cannon Fodder 2 is a 1994 sequel featuring very similar gameplay and graphics to the point where an Amiga Computing review suggested it had more in common with a data disk than a true sequel. The game featured levels set in deserts and an Alien spaceship as well as levels with a medieval theme. Amiga Computing rated the game at 71%. A major difference in the sequel is that the plot involves time travel.

The designer Stuart Campbell wrote: "CF2 was a cross-cultural kinda game. Levels were inspired by films, music, other games, politics and events. Titles came from songs, books, and all manner of other sources".

=== Cancelled sequels ===
After selling Sensible Software to Codemasters, Jon Hare ended up consulting on many of their development projects, one of which was the PS2 title Prince Naseem Boxing. Work on this title was performed in a satellite studio based in Hammersmith, London. However, due to the commercial failure of this title, the studio was shut down. A casualty of this was cancellation of a 3D remake of Cannon Fodder, something that Hare had been working on for at least nine months. Hare did speak about how he was looking to expand on the whole theme of war and include gameplay not just set on the battlefield: "I'd like to focus on the public's perceptions of war and warfare. There's many interesting things that go on behind the scenes with politicians".

In an interview with Eurogamer in late 2005, Hare confirmed that there was up to two years' work (on and off) put into a 3D update of Cannon Fodder: "I designed Cannon Fodder 3 with Codies six years ago, development stopped and started three times and eventually it was seemingly permanently halted when the London studio was closed four years ago. Nothing would please me more than to see this project resurrected, it was very advanced in its structure and therefore would need little modernisation".

In August 2006, Codemasters London announced a brand new version of Cannon Fodder for the PlayStation Portable. The game would have retained its familiar top down view, and the big heads of the soldiers, and for the first time the game would have been 3D. After a large launch announcement which included character renders and screenshots, the game was quietly canceled without explanation. In a later interview, Hare said that Codemasters was hit with economic problems and was forced to sell the studio.

=== Cannon Fodder 3 ===
In 2008, now intellectual property owner Codemasters licensed Russian publisher Game Factory Interactive to develop another sequel. GFI created the game along with developer Burut CT and released it in Russia and the Commonwealth of Independent States on 19 December 2011. English-language media speculated on whether GFI was permitted to release the game outside of that region, but Codemasters ultimately clarified it had reserved but declined the option of publishing the game. GFI released the game in Europe and North America in February 2012 via a download service.

The game retains the core style of its predecessors but with more advanced graphics, a counter-terrorism theme and a greater array of weapons and units. It includes 26 locations around the world and on the moon. English-language publications gave the game mixed, mediocre reviews, with both more positive, and negative reviews appearing elsewhere in Europe.
