= The Temple of Elemental Evil (video game) =

2003 video game

- Developer: Troika Games
- Publisher: Atari
- Director: Tim Cain
- Producers: Thomas R. Decker; Todd Hartwig
- Designers: Tim Cain; Thomas R. Decker
- Programmer: Steve Moret
- Artist: Michael McCarthy
- Composer: Ron Fish
- Series: Greyhawk
- Platform: Windows
- Release: NA: September 16, 2003; EU: October 10, 2003; AU: October 16, 2003
- Genres: Role-playing, turn-based tactics
- Mode: Single-player

The Temple of Elemental Evil is a 2003 role-playing video game by Troika Games. It is a remake of the classic Dungeons & Dragons adventure The Temple of Elemental Evil using the 3.5 edition rules. This is the only computer role-playing game to take place in the Greyhawk campaign setting, and the first video game to implement the 3.5 edition rule set. The game was published by Atari, who then held the interactive rights of the Dungeons & Dragons franchise.

The Temple of Elemental Evil was released in autumn of 2003 and was criticized for stability issues and other bugs. The turn-based tactical combat, however, was generally thought to be implemented well, and is arguably the most faithful representation of the then-current tabletop role-playing game ("3.5e") rules in a video game.

== Gameplay ==
A radial menu is used for choosing a character's actions.

The game focuses on a party of up to five player-controlled characters. These characters can be created by the player or can be one of the pre-made characters that come with the game. All, however, must be within one step of a party alignment. Any player-made characters are created in a 13-step process, but there is an option to let the game deal with most aspects of character creation for the player. At any time, the party can have up to three NPC followers, and all player characters can have a familiar and/or animal companion as allowed by class.

All characters have a screen that shows information pertaining to them. Five tabs—inventory, skills, feats, spells, and abilities—allow the player to manage equipment, change spell configurations, and compare character attributes. This screen also appears when the party is bartering with an NPC or looting a body, but clicking out of the inventory tab will eject the player from the interaction. Additionally, small portraits of the characters appear on the bottom of the screen, along with a small red bar showing remaining health and icons depicting any status conditions, such as level drain, blessings, or paralysis.

The characters are controlled via radial menus. After selecting a character, the player right clicks to open a circular menu. From there, hovering over wedges brings out more options, such as specific spells, actions, or inventory items. The main radial menu, which encircles a picture of the character selected, has up to six sections, the number being based on class abilities. Specific actions are color-coded based on the type of action they are.

Characters can use their skills throughout the game by selecting them on the radial menu. To pick another character's pocket, the player would select a character with the Sleight of Hand skill, left-click on the skill from the radial menu, and left click on the victim. Dialog skills, such as Intimidate and Gather Information, appear as options in dialog with an icon denoting the skill being used. Skills are increased every level at a rate derived from the character's class and Intelligence.

Combat is turn-based, with characters going individually based on their initiative. Each character can make five types of actions: free, no, full-round, move, and standard. Characters can take a move action and a standard action each turn. Full-round actions count as a use of both actions. Free actions take a negligible amount of time to perform, so they count as neither actions. No actions also count for neither actions, but they require special circumstances in order to be performed. Characters can choose special attacks to perform or spells to cast, and they can also choose to attack or cast in specific ways. Defensive casting and fighting, dealing non-lethal damage, tripping an opponent, and coup de graces are examples of particular actions in combat. Characters have a set yet semi-random number of hit points based on their level, class, and Constitution score. Upon being reduced to zero hit points, a character is staggered, and a full round action will cost him or her one hit point. A creature with hit points between −1 and −9 is unconscious, and loses one hit point a round. The character has a 10% chance of stabilizing, which will stop the loss of hit points but will keep the character unconscious. Other characters can stop this loss of life through a successful heal check. If a character or creature reaches −10 hit points, it dies.

Although most of the main rules from 3.5 edition of Dungeons & Dragons are implemented, there are several exceptions. Some of them, such as applying a bonus to AC from the Dodge feat, are simplified to streamline play. Others, such as not letting prone characters attack, are implemented to reduce the number of required animations. The structure of the engine is also utilized, allowing encumbered characters to move at 3/4 their maximum rate, even if the resulting speed is not a whole number. Certain abilities, including Barbarian Rage, are modified to better flow with the game. A hybridization of some rules also occurred; the spell Doom is modified to reflect the first printing of the Player's Handbook, and weapon sizes are a blend of 3 and 3.5 editions. The game also has two difficulty levels, Normal and Ironman, with the latter intended to more closely mimic the paper-and-pencil game.

== Plot ==
Thirteen years before the start of the game, Hommlet was a peaceful town. Due to low taxes and safe roads, the area became prosperous, and the village flourished. This prosperity drew the attention of evil forces, who began slowly trickling into the area. It is not known where these forces came from, but the Dyvers of Nyr Dyv and the inhabitants of the forestlands of the Wild Coast were the chief suspects. As the presence of bandits, kobolds, and goblins increased, a local militia led by Waldgraf of Ostverk was raised to defend Hommlet. This only served to check the evil forces, however.

Six miles from Hommlet, a group of hovels formed a center for the evil activity. The locals ignored this threat since it was in the marshes, and Nulb began growing. A small chapel built to an evil god grew into a stone structure as the evil forces pillaged and robbed the lands around Hommlet. For three years the Temple of Elemental Evil served as a center for the swarms of vile creatures who plagued Hommlet. As the evil grew in power, the land around the Temple suffered from pestilence, famine, and a lack of commerce.

The leaders of the Temple grew too power-hungry, and they were defeated in the Battle of Emridy Meadows after challenging the kingdoms of the north. The evil forces were slaughtered, and their mighty Temple was destroyed and sealed with magic and blessings. In the years that followed, Hommlet became a destination for adventurers, who brought wealth to the city and returned the area to its peaceful origins. Eventually, adventurers stopped coming, and the village went back to life as usual. A year before the start of the game, bandits once again began trickling into the region, and the villagers appealed to the Lord, the Viscount of Verbobonc, for aid. He responded by providing funds for Burne and Rufus, two well-known adventurers from the area, to build a keep just outside Hommlet.

=== Story ===
The game begins with an opening vignette that is determined by the alignment of the party. All of these require the player to start in the town of Hommlet. After arriving in town and completing minor quests for the townsfolk, the player is directed to the moathouse, a small, fortified outpost to the east. The moathouse is home to bandits, and the player is asked to clear them out. However, in the dungeons of the moathouse, the player encounters a large force of bugbears led by an ogre named Lubash and a priest of the Temple of Elemental Evil, Lareth the Beautiful.

After defeating Lareth, the player can then go to either the Temple itself, or to Nulb, a town in the swamplands nearby. If the player goes to Nulb, many of the citizens will talk of the Temple. Spies for the Temple are living in the town, and the player can gain passage into the heart of the Temple by pretending to be interested in joining. The Temple is divided into four factions: Earth, Air, Water, and Fire Temples. Each Temple is at war with the other three in a perpetual struggle for supremacy. The player is asked by all four to provide assistance, and can gain access to Hedrak, the leader of the Temple of Elemental Evil, by performing quests for the sub-Temples. Most of the sub-Temples require the player to kill a leader of an opposing Temple to gain access to Hedrak.

Upon meeting Hedrak, the player has two options: kill him, or accept his quest. If the player accepts the quest, which is to kill Scoorp the Hill giant, Hedrak will make the player a part of the Temple of Elemental Evil, thus ending the game. If the player kills Hedrak, the way to four nodes of elemental power will be available. Inside each of these nodes is a gem. These gems can be inserted into the Orb of Golden Death, which is hidden inside the Temple, to form a powerful artifact. Deep inside the Temple, the player must then deal with Zuggtmoy, the Demoness Lady of fungus. The player can, based on choices made, fight Zuggtmoy, fight a weaker version of Zuggtmoy, or avoid a fight altogether. This can lead to one of three endings if the player succeeds: Zuggtmoy is banished for 66 years, Zuggtmoy is destroyed permanently, or Zuggtmoy lives on, but the player is well rewarded.

== Development ==
The Temple of Elemental Evil was intended as re-creation of the classic Dungeons & Dragons module of the same name. The publisher was Atari, who then held the interactive rights to the Dungeons & Dragons franchise. Its developer was Troika Games, who began the project on February 1, 2002, with a development team of 14 people. The game was first announced in January 2003, under the title Greyhawk: The Temple of Elemental Evil. It was developed with an enhanced version of the Arcanum: Of Steamworks and Magick Obscura game engine.

Originally the designers intended to use the Dungeons & Dragons 3.0 edition rule set, but decided in mid-development to use the 3.5 edition rule set instead. In order to complete this adaptation, Atari gave Troika an additional two months of development time, extending their deadline to August 1, but the game was not completed until August 30. Some of the reasons for this included the need for extensive testing and the creation of unique play experiences for characters of different alignments. The game went gold on September 4, 2003, 19 days before it was originally intended to be shipped.

== Reception ==
Reception

Aggregate scores
Aggregator	Score
GameRankings	71%
Metacritic	71/100

Review scores
Publication	Score
Computer Gaming World	2.5/5
GameSpot	7.9/10
IGN	7.5/10
PC Gamer (US)	79%
Computer Games Magazine	3.5/5

With sales of 128,000 copies and revenues of $5.2 million by February 2005, The Temple of Elemental Evil was less commercially successful than Arcanum, Troika Games' previous release. GameDaily characterized both games' commercial performances as substandard, and as contributing factors to Troika's closure in 2005. The Temple of Elemental Evil's critical reception was "mixed or average", according to the review aggregation website Metacritic.

The game was reviewed in 2004 in Dragon #321 by Clifford Horowitz in the "Silicon Sorcery" column. Horowitz comments that The Temple of Elemental Evil is a classic Dungeons & Dragons game as the players can get.

PC Gamer's Desslock called it "a game by D&D fans and for D&D fans", and that it provides all RPG fans with the opportunity to experience one of the genre's classic adventures. GameSpot's Greg Kasavin echoed those sentiments and gave the game a 7.9 out of 10. Jamie Madigan of GameSpy gave the game four out of five stars, but he made note of a lack of multiplayer options. Tal Blevins of IGN gave it a 7.5 score. GameZone gave an 8.4 out of 10, saying that the fans of D&D-based RPGs should have it in their collection. John Breeden II of The Washington Post complimented the game's graphics, particularly the animated scenery, and also said that "[m]onsters appear suitably gruesome". According to GameSpy, players who persevered were rewarded with an ultimately fun and satisfying experience, but not the mind-blowing one they had hoped for.

Adam Fleet of Computer Games Magazine wrote that the game in its current state is a testament to just how good this game could have been, as well as the barren state of the current RPG landscape in general.

In 2004, the Academy of Interactive Arts & Sciences nominated The Temple of Elemental Evil for Computer Role-Playing Game of the Year, but was ultimately awarded to Star Wars: Knights of the Old Republic. It was also a finalist in RPG Vault's special award categories for audio design and art direction that year. However, the game did receive Computer Games Magazine's special "Raid™ Post-patch Recovery Award" and GameSpy's "Old School RPG Award" for 2003. The latter publication's editors wrote that no other game brought back memories of the old pen-and-paper Dungeons & Dragons days the way Temple of Elemental Evil did.

=== Controversy ===
Upon its release, The Temple of Elemental Evil created a small stir due to the availability of the option for a male character to enter a same-sex marriage. In the town of Nulb, a pirate named Bertram begins flirting with male characters in the party and offers a lifetime of love and happiness in exchange for his freedom. This relationship was noted as another example of video games "pushing the boundaries" by The Guardian. Game developers and publishers generally did not object to the inclusion of a homosexual story option. Criticism of the relationship came primarily from gamers who felt that gay characters should not be included in video games. Industry observer Matthew D. Barton commented on the irony of so-called "geeky gamers", subject to stereotyping themselves, stereotyping gays in their opposition. Producer Tom Decker defended the move, saying in an interview with RPG Vault: "I particularly felt strongly that since we had several heterosexual marriages available in Hommlet, we should include at least one homosexual encounter in the game and not to make it a stereotyped, over the top situation, but on par with the other relationships available in the game". Bertram was named #6 on GayGamer.net's Top 20 Gayest Video Game Characters.

== Legacy ==
As the release version of the game had many bugs, Troika released three patches which addressed some of the problems. After the closure of the developer and consequent end of official support, the game community took up the patching efforts with community-made patches and mods, providing many bug fixes, improvements, and new content. Another improvement released in 2015 is a recreated game engine called Temple+, similar in functionality to OpenMW for Morrowind and built using Python, allowing for increased flexibility and avoidance of legacy coding limitations and issues.

The game was re-released by GOG.com, a digital distributor, on October 13, 2010. Ian Williams of Paste rated the game #6 on his list of "The 10 Greatest Dungeons and Dragons Videogames" in 2015.
