= Stratagus =

Game engine

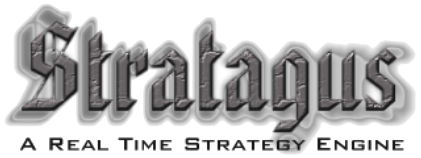
- Developer: Stratagus team
- Initial release: June 15, 1998; 27 years ago
- Stable release: 3.3.2 / August 10, 2022; 3 years ago
- Repository: github.com/Wargus/stratagus
- Written in: C++
- Operating system: AmigaOS 4, BSD, Linux, Mac OS X, MorphOS, AROS, Windows
- Type: Game engine; Linux as gaming platform
- License: GPL-2.0-only
- Website: stratagus.com

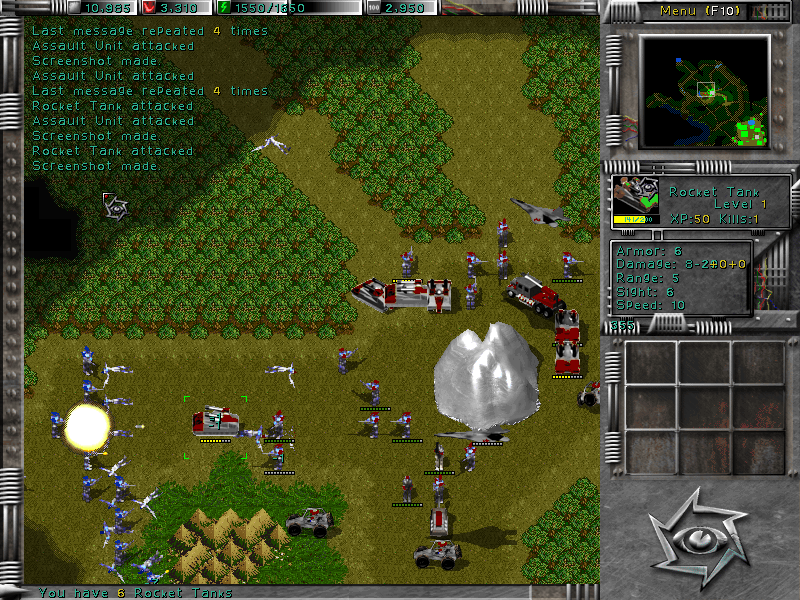
Battle of Survival screenshot

Stratagus is a free and open-source cross-platform game engine used to build real-time strategy video games. Licensed under the GNU GPL-2.0-only, it is written mostly in C++ with the configuration language being Lua.

== History ==
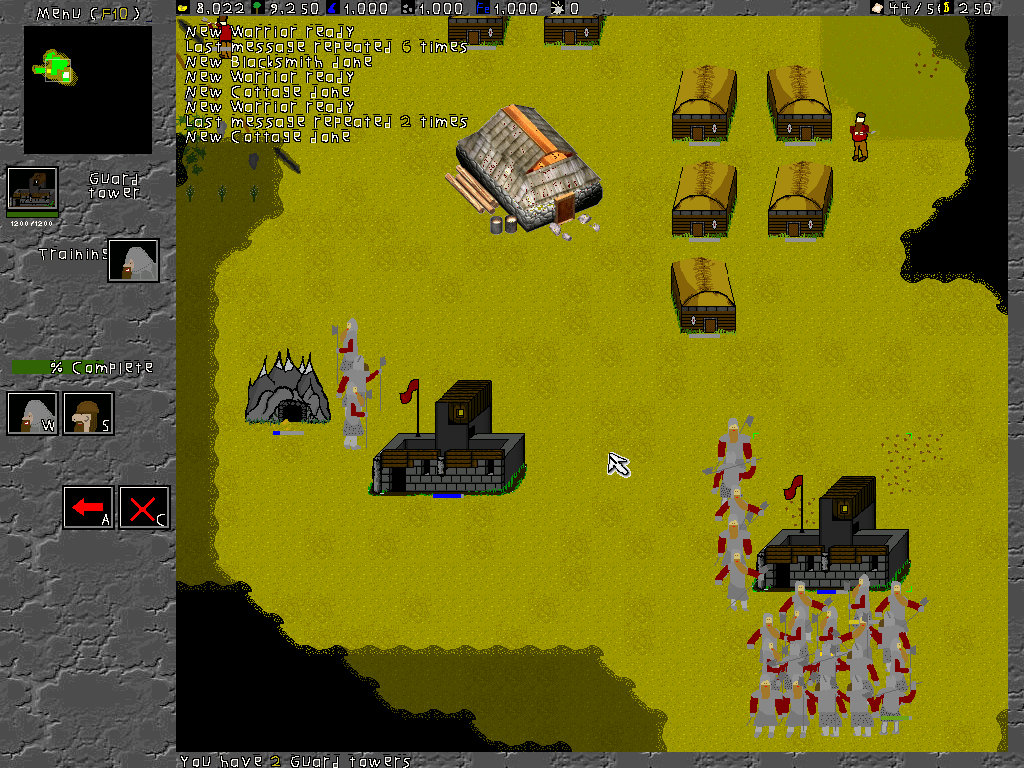
Battle for Mandicor screenshot (2005)

On June 15, 1998 Lutz Sammer released the first public version of a free Warcraft II clone for Linux he had written, named ALE Clone. In 1999 it was renamed to Freecraft. In June 2003, a cease and desist letter was received from Blizzard Entertainment, who thought the name Freecraft could cause confusion with the names StarCraft and Warcraft, and that some of the ideas within the engine were too similar to Warcraft II. The project halted on June 20, 2003.

The developers regrouped in 2004 to continue work on the project, renaming it Stratagus. Their focus changed from cloning Warcraft II to creating an open source, configurable engine for RTS games including support for playing over Internet/LAN or playing vs. computer opponents. A separate project, Wargus, was started to get Warcraft II data files running in the Stratagus engine. This mod requires a legal copy of Warcraft II and allows for cross-platform support such as Linux and other operating systems. The free media set imitating Warcraft II was discontinued.

On June 10, 2007, development of Stratagus was paused.

The Stratagus developers began working on Bos Wars, which uses its own modified version of the Stratagus engine.

In June 2010 some of the developers moved Stratagus project from SourceForge to Launchpad and started working on Stratagus and games again. Wargus (for Warcraft II), War1gus (for Warcraft I) and Stargus (for Starcraft) continued to be developed by the Stratagus team on Launchpad. In 2014, Wyrmgus started as a fork from the Stratagus engine to develop a strategy game based on free assets with a wider scope than the original engine allowed. The Stratagus team has since also moved to GitHub.

Playable Stratagus-based games are: fantasy Aleona's Tales, medieval Battle for Mandicor, Warcraft II: Tides of Darkness (plus expansion Beyond the Dark Portal) port Wargus, Warcraft: Orcs and Humans port War1gus, futuristic Battle of Survival, historically-inspired Commander Stalin, StarCraft port Stargus, and space age Astroseries. Of these, only Aleona's Tales, Wargus, War1gus, and Wyrmsun are complete.

== Programming ==
The Stratagus engine is a 2D engine based on cross-platform open-source libraries like SDL, gzip, bzip2 and others.

Basing on Lua as their primary scripting language, virtually all the abilities in the engine have been made available to the users of Stratagus for easy modding, removing the need to change the original C/C++ source. Animations are created from a set of .png pictures; this technique was commonly used in the time that Warcraft and other RTS had come out.

Stratagus and Wargus have been ported to run on Pocket PC, Symbian and Android devices. Wargus has also been ported to the GP2X and Open Pandora Linux handhelds.

== Reception ==
Stratagus was downloaded from SourceForge.net between 2004 and June 2017 over 185,000 times.

== See also ==
- Game engine recreation
- bnetd
