= Urban Assault =

1998 video game

- Developer: TerraTools
- Publisher: Microsoft Games
- Designer: Bernd Beyreuther
- Composers: Sylvius Lack; Mark Snow
- Platforms: Microsoft Windows, PlayStation (cancelled)
- Release: NA: August 18, 1998; EU: September 1, 1998; JP: October 9, 1998
- Genres: First-person shooter, Real-time strategy
- Modes: Single-player, multiplayer

Urban Assault is a 3D combined first-person shooter and real-time strategy computer game developed by the German company TerraTools and published by Microsoft in the year 1998.

It was the third strategy title that was directly published by Microsoft Game Studios. The player creates and commands groups of tanks and aircraft, and can also take direct control of one vehicle at a time. Over the course of the game one can acquire upgrades and new vehicles.

== Gameplay ==
The player is in command of a futuristic host station with plasma energy technology, allowing the player to create units and buildings, as long as the blueprints and sufficient energy are available. The player also has access to various commander assets such as an overhead map screen, where the player can monitor actions on the battlefield in the bigger picture and assess various strategic and tactical elements that are not covered by the fog of war, or Squadron Manager, which allows the player to easily check status and manage all units under control as well as set various parameters for each squadron to better suit their specializations. The Map and Squadron Manager windows are fully interactive and can be turned on/off at any time. Most importantly, these windows can be re-sized and re-positioned into anywhere on the screen, allowing players to accommodate their preferences.

The levels in Urban Assault consist of a full 3D polygonal landscape, which can be used strategically or tactically by the players or AI units to their advantages. For example, neutral buildings or structures can be used as a cover to block the enemy fire, while terrains and elevations offer a vertical depth of tactical elements. Many unit types (or even individual units) also possess varying advantages in different environments, allowing the player to carefully plan their unit compositions to effectively counter the enemy unit presences.

In the single-player campaign, the objective of each mission is to capture each key sector on the map, allowing use of the beam gate to transport the host station and any accompanying vehicles to the next field of battle. However, destroying enemy host stations provides additional space to the player's maximum room for accompanying vehicles. Combined with the fact that many key sectors are located deep in enemy territory or even right below an enemy faction's host station, the unstated goal of the game is to eliminate all enemy host stations. There is no strict need to eliminate the enemy to complete a level, but it does make the task more reliable. In multiplayer, beam gates are not present on the map and the only objective is to destroy opponents.

Urban Assault also has a completely cheat-free AI, which is bound to many same restrictions and rules as the players are. Just like the players, the AI players must peel back the fog of war by securing a line-of-sight with reconnaissance units or radar stations first in order to assess and gather information around the level before making decisions. The AI players also harvest energy from the power sources and surrounding sectors the same way as the players do. Without any power source or controlling sufficient sectors to sustain their power stations, the AI will eventually run out of energy and be unable to perform any actions, just like the players would be. The AI in Urban Assault is not only cheat-free but instead subject to various disadvantages that the players do not have in the game, such as energy upkeep mechanics or inability to quickly teleport their host stations, which helps with maintaining both the performance and difficulty levels of the game for less experienced players.

=== Resources ===
Like most strategy games, the game is centered on resources. The sole resource in Urban Assault is energy, which is required to build units and buildings used to conquer other factions. Energy is gained through controlling power stations. Each power station emits energy relative to the number of white boxes attached to it on the map screen.

Power stations are also limited in power output by the number of adjacent sectors controlled by the player, referred to in-game as "efficiency". The more power stations the player controls, the more sectors are required to sustain their output. If the player controls too many power stations but too few sectors, it will weaken their energy production. This design encourages the player to gradually increase control of the map to increase their energy gathering rate by conquering surrounding sectors or taking away sectors from the enemies, in order to create more powerful forces while weakening the enemy's production capacity. Powerful units and buildings require significant amounts of energy to build.

The energy output from friendly power stations can also repair friendly units in nearby friendly sectors, while the hostile power sources can damage friendly units if they are present in enemy sectors with enemy power stations in the vicinity. Therefore, securing or constructing power stations around the level can not only help with expanding the host station's zone of influence, but also provides direct logistical benefits. The factions involved in battle will constantly fight over the sectors to increase their map control capacity while decreasing the influence of the others.

The management of energy sources is an important aspect of the game. Geographically scattered power stations provide better mobility and map control for the player since teleporting over a friendly power station is free, but often require the player to gain control of additional sectors to maintain steady energy recharge rate, and each power station still require protection from enemy factions' attempt to capture them. On the other hand, a base of closely clustered power stations provides more efficient energy absorption rates. The player should decide which tactic is appropriate or preferred for the level, and if need to, destroy excess power stations to improve energy absorption rates on other power stations.

=== Controls ===
During the gameplay, the game allows completely free mouse movements that can be used to interact with command interface on the screen, or perform various actions which is a crucial feature for the RTS-style functionality. Vehicle controls in FPS mode are usually accomplished by either a keyboard or a joystick (as recommended by the developers), although the player can always choose to activate/deactivate the "Mouse Control Mode" at any time by clicking the right-mouse button while occupying a vehicle to control it with both mouse and keyboard, or mouse and joystick inputs simultaneously in the first-person control mode. This allows for more precise and reactive control of vehicles, but sacrifices some control over RTS elements since the mouse movements become directly locked to the first-person view of the vehicle. Therefore, the player should make decisions when they should activate/deactivate the mouse control mode based on the situations and tactical/strategic needs (only if they intend to use it).

Taking manual control of any vehicle directly in the first-person mode also provides significant stat boosts to the units in terms of firepower, shielding, and manoeuvrability. Most importantly, it also allows the players to override any preset AI combat behaviours assigned for individual units to handle the situations more flexibly and reactively. This design highly encourages the players to take control of vehicles and lead the battle whenever possible to gain tactical supremacy against the AI-only armies. All units in the game are designed with unique properties and different strengths, but a carefully controlled unit by the player can even turn the odds in combat.

== Plot ==
The plot of Urban Assault is set in the near future, where a set of hazardous natural and artificial disasters involving ozone depletion caused by the global industrial emissions, termed The Big Mistake, results in toxin generation and eventually destruction of the ocean's phytoplankton, causing the Earth's food chain to collapse gradually and consecutively. Scarce food supplies and adverse environmental damage results in a resource war with accelerated scientific developments, and the plasma formation technology — the ability to form solid constructions of matters using only energy — in conjunction with the futuristic state-of-the-art host station technology, allows cybernetically-linked military commanders uploaded into these mobile war machine battle-stations to create entire armies made out of fully roboticized artificial intelligence military drones under their direct command & control to wage war across the global theatres.

The technology was leaked to enemy factions, destroying fragile political alliances and launching the planet into a third world war. Citizens are forced into newly emerging domed cities and communities, which shield them from dangerous levels of solar radiation and filters the toxic air. However, most of the population had already consumed contaminated food and exposed to excessive amounts of ionising radiation, that most died within several years. Most of the planet's surface had been devastated and rendered uninhabitable. The wars have become entirely roboticized, solely involving various types of war machines and military drones with artificial intelligence modules that are directly connected to the command & control system of the host station battle network.

The surviving humans had divided into major warring factions: The Resistance, Ghorkovs, Taerkastens, and the Black Sect. The main theatre of the single-player campaign takes place in the extensive geographical networks of domed cities installed throughout the entire continent of Europe.

A group of alien invaders, the Mykonians, view humans as being unworthy of occupying such a resource-rich planet, and implant their Parasite Machine into the crust of the planet to extract energy and heat directly from the Earth's core. The Parasite Machine is causing the Earth's core to cool, weakening its magnetic field and lowering the temperature of the planet. The weakening of the magnetic field will eventually cause solar radiation levels on the planet's surface to rise and obliterate all of the planet's biomass, making it suitable for Mykonian colonization. In the campaign, Mykonian forces are usually present in Northern Europe and Scandinavia, where the optimal cooling temperatures allow for more efficient superconductive data transfer and electronics operation.

A second group of alien invaders, the plant-like Sulgogars, have invaded Northern Africa, where the relatively warm climate creates a suitable spawning ground. It has been mentioned that Sulgogars eat humans and extract minerals from the ground, and the fact that humans killed the ocean may have contributed to their animosity against the human race. The Sulgogars are also known to have migrated into the ocean body of the Earth shortly before the events of The Big Mistake, which supports this theory. In the original campaign, the Sulgogars are rarely encountered and only appeared in a few missions including the final confrontation.

In addition to the in-game mission briefing texts, a significant portion of comprehensive, in-depth background lore of the game are scattered and hidden deep inside the game's Help files. One could access these fragmented storyline materials by clicking the special glowing button that appears on numerous help pages.

== Factions ==
=== The Resistance ===
The Resistance represents the last traces of democracy and freedom to survive global chaos. The Resistance was months away from destruction when a coalition of engineers and hackers wired together the free world's computers to create seven host stations. The host stations, however, had a caveat: no one would entrust the task of defending democracy and freedom to machines, so each host station was piloted by a Synaptic Donor Unit, abbreviated SDU. These SDUs were regarded as heroes, who, according to the game's help files, "sacrificed their humanity for the continual humanity of others." The faction is also notable for its various state-of-the-art technological inventions, such as the "Stoudson Bomb", which has a key role in eliminating the enemy forces in many levels it appears in. The Resistance's HQ and training grounds are located in Britain, with the rest of their forces and former contested territories dispersed throughout Western Europe.

In the original single-player campaign, the player's role is that of the last SDU champion to be deployed into battle, SDU 7. The player can read the diary entries of the fallen SDUs on the briefing for each game. The Resistance assets tend to be focused on specialization and combined arms, and therefore has the greatest variety of war machines and buildings. Some of these examples include the Dragonfly heavy assault helicopter, the sub-nuclear missile launching Rhino, the experimental air-superiority fighter Warhammer, and the anti-air tank Fox. They are usually based around modern and conventional designs and their weapons consist primarily of machine guns, artillery shells, rockets and missiles. The Resistance owns the game's 2nd most efficient power station (6-bars with self-defense guns) and the most efficient radar station (15-sector radius), but these are only available in single-player.

The faction's strengths in general are mainly its versatility and cost-effectiveness, while their weaknesses are the units being average and therefore usually outclassed by the other factions' counterpart with other aspects being equal. As an example, the Resistance Tiger is the "average" heavy tank that loses out to the Taerkasten Leonid in terms of armor and loses out to the Ghorkovian Tekh-Trak in terms of speed. In the original single-player campaign, The Resistance Host Station is the weakest host station in order to justify their declined status in the lore. In the multiplayer mode, the host stations from all playable factions are equalized in both armor and firepower for balance.

=== Ghorkovs ===
The Ghorkovs is a faction of humanity that holds totalitarianism and communism ideals and is the most similar to The Resistance in terms of the vehicles and technology they use. Their vehicle designs and weaponry are more futuristic, including usage of electromagnetic pulses. The Ghorkov host station icon is a red star. The Ghorkovs were originally allies of the Resistance, but later turned against them when the Resistance attempted to sell the Ghorkovs out to the Mykonians. The Ghorkovs control vast territories across Eurasia, and therefore can be frequently encountered in more missions than the other factions in the original Resistance campaign. The faction emerged from Eastern Europe after The Big Mistake.

In the single-player campaign, the Ghorkovs begin as the first enemy the player encounters in the game, and frequently reappear in later missions. Ghorkovian units generally possess higher speed and agility compared to most other factions' units, trading off with lesser armor. The Ghorkovs' buildings on the other hand are the most durable. The Ghorkovian arsenal include many advanced vehicles such as the Tekh-Trak, a hybrid medium-heavy ground assault tank; the Speedy, an anti-air hovercraft tank armed with homing lasers; the Gigant, a massive saucer-shaped aircraft that specializes in destroying host stations; and their staple Ghargoil series of anti-tank aircraft. Exploiting their fast and mobile attack forces to perform a blitzkrieg assault on key enemy strategic targets is a common tactic employed by them. The Ghorkovs utilize a variety of both conventional and energy-based weaponry.

In single-player, the Ghorkovs have two different classes of host stations: The smaller Turantul I which appears in the early levels, followed by the larger mothership Turantul II. The Turantul II, also known as its nickname "Skorpio", is generally considered the most powerful host station in the game, whose extensive firepower even allow Ghorkov players to use it as an offensive tool in battle. In multiplayer, the Ghorkovs will be always assigned with their Turantul II Skorpio-class mothership. While the Ghorkovs are the most similar to the Resistance in terms of faction designs, their units tend to be less specialized and more general-purpose oriented compared to the Resistance vehicles, with their main strengths lie on various air units.

=== Taerkastens ===
The Taerkasts is a faction of humanity that represent a fundamentalist, Neo-Luddite society, abhorrent of technology. Hypocritically, they embrace plasma formation technology and possess their own versions of "technologically" advanced armaments and equipment, regarding these as a necessary evil. The Taerkasten host station icon is a heraldic emblem with a sword and a shield. A majority of their technology design is based around the First/Second World War with some exceptions. The Taerkastens blame more "technological" factions like The Resistance and Ghorkovs for destroying the Earth's ozone layer and its atmosphere.

They have a cult-like formation with the traditions resembling a monastic order or a masonic fraternity, and are situated in much of Southern Europe and Africa, and are heavily based on the ideas of religion and theocracy. Despite their current geographical location, the faction was originated in Central and Northern Europe and the game's lore states that they were the first human group to encounter the Mykonians. In the original campaign, they are infamous for getting into conflict with the Ghorkovs. The Taerkasts mainly use conventional weapon designs just like the Resistance, an exception to this is their Bronsteijn combat satellite armed with a massive ion cannon blast. Lore-wise, the Taerkastens are also responsible for creating the most efficient "Stonehenge" power stations, which cannot be constructed normally in the levels.

In the game, Taerkasten units are typically heavily armored and have strong attacks, but the majority of them are slow and especially vulnerable to hit and run tactics. Some of their vehicles are particularly notorious for their extremely heavy shielding, such as the Zeppelin bomber airship. The backbone of conventional Taerkast assault usually involves the massed Eisenhans and Leonid tank divisions, with the Hetzel fighter plane and Mnosjetz bomber plane support. The Taerkasten Host Station is the Flying Fortress, whose turret design possesses a fatal flaw in the form of defensive blind-spots that sometimes allow a human opponent to stay close to one side and relentlessly attack without fear of reprisal from the host station. Taerkasten units are designed to be more AI-friendly among the playable factions.

=== Mykonians ===
The extraterrestrial invader Mykonians disdain humanity for wasting a precious birthright like the Earth. They see Earth as nothing more than a battery and use the Parasite Machine to drain the power from the Earth's core. Mykonian units have geometric shapes. This is the result of their biovein construction, which forms in crystalline symmetry in zero-gravity space. Their units possess evocative names like "Air Prism" and "Ground Cube." The Mykonians are typically located in Northern Europe and Scandinavia with their biovein-infested environments, where their data transfer is optimal as well as their vehicles and buildings blend in with the surroundings better. All Mykonians weaponry is classified as Ion Cannon.

In the game, Mykonian units have weak shielding, but generally possess one of the strongest attacks in the game. Especially with their units like X01 Quadda (a pun on the German word "Quader") or Hourglass (also known as "Myko Schwer") capable of inflicting massive damage in a short time. Their units also tend to be very agile and maneuverable. The Mykonian units predominantly consist of various ion-propelled aircraft with only one ground unit in their arsenal. The Mykonian Host Station in the original single-player campaign uses a single Ion Cannon as self-defense weaponry, which makes it easily overwhelmed by a large squad of enemy units despite the Ion Cannon's great firepower. In single-player, the Mykonians can only create one class of power station, which is more efficient than a standard 2-bar power station but is still weaker than a standard 4-bar power station available to all the human factions. In multiplayer, the Mykonians can create the power stations as efficient as the other human factions.

Destruction of the Parasite Machine is the focus and the main objective of the original single-player campaign, which is shown in the final mission where the player must destroy it before a long in-game timer runs out. The multiplayer gives the Mykonian Host Station more self-defense cannons but equalized its firepower with the other factions, and equalized its availability of power stations with the other factions for a balance. The Mykonian as a faction is specifically designed to excel when controlled by human players instead of AI.

=== Sulgogars ===
The off-world Sulgogars treat the Earth as fertilizer and hope to claim the planet as their spawning grounds. A vegetative species of bionic alien, their powers reside in biotechnology, genetic manipulation and cloning. Similar to the Mykonians, they make exclusive use of advanced energy-based weapons. The game's lore states that the Sulgogars can extract minerals from the ground and view humans as food. They also wish to exterminate the humans from the Earth for causing the environmental destruction and ecological collapse followed by the Big Mistake. All Sulgogars weapons are classified as Particle Beam.

The Sulgogars are rarely encountered, only appearing in a few missions in the original campaign. In the game, the Sulgogars arguably possess one of the most powerful weapons, surpassing even the Mykonians in some parts. As a part of the game balance, the Sulgogars' weaknesses in exchange for their individually powerful units are their severe inflexibility, lack of versatility, and their inability to create buildings - They have a very few variety of units and all are airborne, rendering them mostly vulnerable to attacks from anti-air tanks and also helpless when their power sources are destroyed since they possess no means of restoring power stations on their own. The Sulgogar Queen possesses one of the strongest self-defense weaponry among all the faction's host stations, but with only one weapon turret, it is easily overwhelmed by a large squad of enemy units.

The Sulgogars are not available in Multiplayer. This single-player exclusive enemy faction is considered out of the balance cycle between the other major factions and it was never designed as a faction to be played on multiplayer.

=== The Black Sect ===
The Black Sect is a mysterious confederation allegedly composed of pirates, scavengers, and mercenaries who have decided to enter the war for personal profit and gain. One of the in-game briefing line states that their true "origin could be traced back to the earliest European secret societies, with all the requisite branches into the royal families". Having no original units of their own, the Black Sect relies on stealing technology from other factions, including the Resistance Anvil-class host station (the prototype model of SDU1 that SDU7 was meant to use) and the Taerkasten Bronsteijn flying ion cannon. The Black Sect also has the ability to create even Mykonian and Sulgogar units, which hints that even the aliens have a history with the Sect. This is backed up with the constant communication with the human forces and the Mykonians during the course of events.

In the original campaign for single-player, the Black Sect has invaded the region surrounding the Black Sea, and only appears towards the end of the game. Black Sect units have a special stealth projection, rendering them invisible to the player's radar. This translates to hampering the player's real-time strategy capabilities, forcing the player to adopt a more active first-person shooter role. For every mission that the Black Sect appears in, they are able to create a portion of units from all factions that made an appearance in the battlefield. Their host station is one of the most durable with strong self-defense capabilities. Overall, the player cannot easily exploit any weaknesses in the Black Sect like they can do for the other factions, and therefore they are arguably the most difficult faction to defeat. They are often recommended to be the top priority to be eliminated.

The Black Sect cannot be played in Multiplayer. This single-player exclusive enemy faction is considered out of the balance cycle between the other playable factions on multiplayer and it was never designed to be played by players.

== Localization ==
According to the game's credits, Urban Assault is officially translated and released with full audio support in four languages: English, French, German, and Japanese.

== Reception ==
Reception

Aggregate score
| Aggregator | Score |
|---|---|
| GameRankings | 70% |

Review scores
| Publication | Score |
|---|---|
| CNET Gamecenter | 8/10 |
| Computer Games Strategy Plus | 2.5/5 |
| GamePro | 4/5 (Note: GamePro gave the game two 3/5 scores for graphics and sound, 3.5/5 for control, and 4/5 for overall fun factor.) |
| GameSpot | 6.5/10 |
| IGN | 6.8/10 |
| Jeuxvideo.com | 16/20 |
| Joystick | 4.5/5 (Note: Joystick (magazine) gave the game 91/100 for technique, 90/100 for overall design, and 86/100 for interest factor.) |
| Next Generation | 3/5 |
| PC Accelerator | 7/10 |
| PC Gamer (US) | 80% |
| PC Zone | 85% |

Urban Assault received positive to above-average reviews according to the review aggregation website GameRankings.

The game suffered heavily from lack of advertisements. Common criticisms included complex control and interface, monotony and a little variety in game modes, steep difficulty and learning curves. Praise included innovative and original gameplay, immersive 3D battlefield experience consisting fully destructive environments, tactical and strategic depths involving diverse range of ground and air vehicles, balance model consisting four entirely unique and asymmetrically designed factions, non-cheating single-player AI, an excellent joystick support, and the introductory video with music by Mark Snow. Next Generation said of the game, "There's enough variation to keep you playing, but not enough to really consider this a major step forward in a new sub-genre that's ripe for exploitation."

According to the developer, until 1999 the game sold 400,000 units.

In spite of its mediocre reception from various press reviews, the game is usually scored very high on user/customer scores at numerous game review websites. As of 2021, the game retains an active fan community that provides comprehensive technical support and assistance for the game for modern hardware. For instance in 2016, the community released a game engine recreation on GitHub.

== Metropolis Dawn ==
An expansion pack for the game was originally planned under the title "Metropolis Dawn". However, it was never officially released due to contract issues between its publisher. The expansion allowed the player to play as the Taerkasten or the Ghorkov factions in their respective single-player campaigns, as well as adding new vehicles and levels. Although never released for sale, a near-complete copy was leaked to the internet community before TerraTools became RadonLabs.
