= Bos Wars =

2004 video game

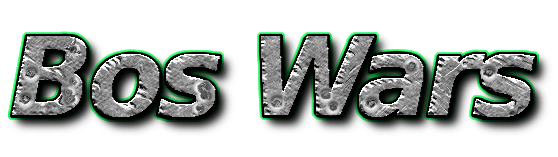
- Developer(s): Bos Wars Team
- Initial release: 1.0 / March 6, 2004; 21 years ago
- Stable release: 2.8 / June 16, 2023; 21 months ago
- Repository: codeberg.org/boswars/boswars/
- Platform: AmigaOS 4, MorphOS, AROS, Linux, Windows, Cross-platform
- Type: Single-player, multiplayer Real-time strategy
- License: GPL-2.0-or-later
- Website: www.boswars.org

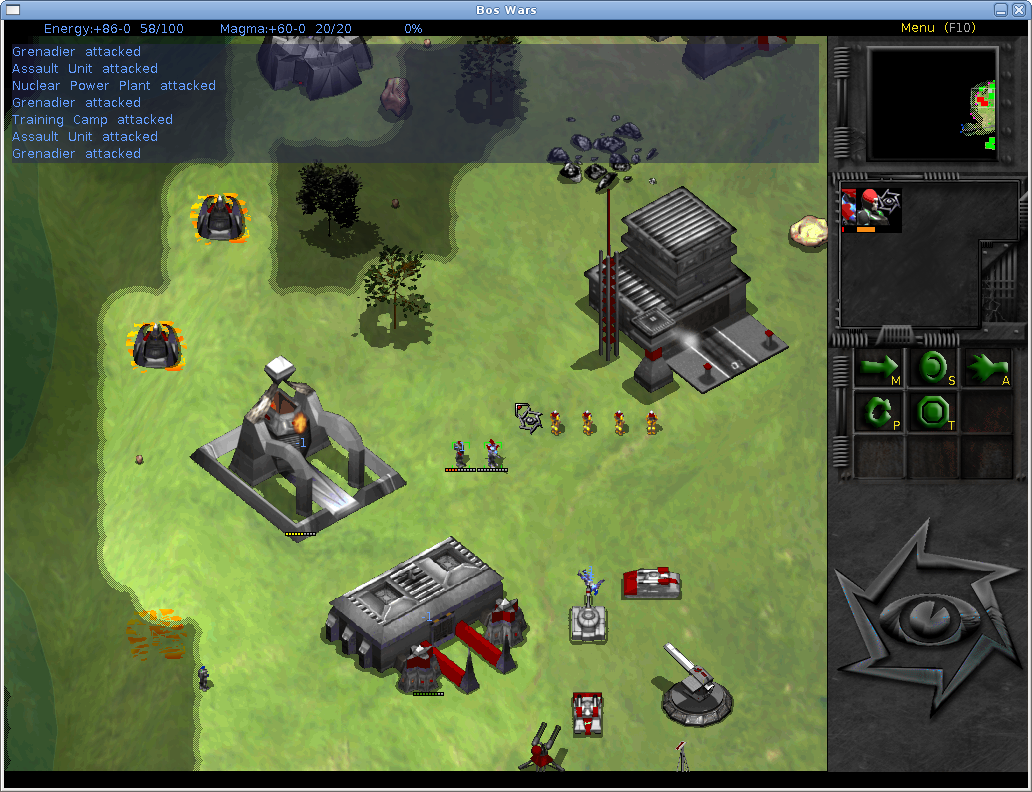
Screenshot of the game (v2.5.0)

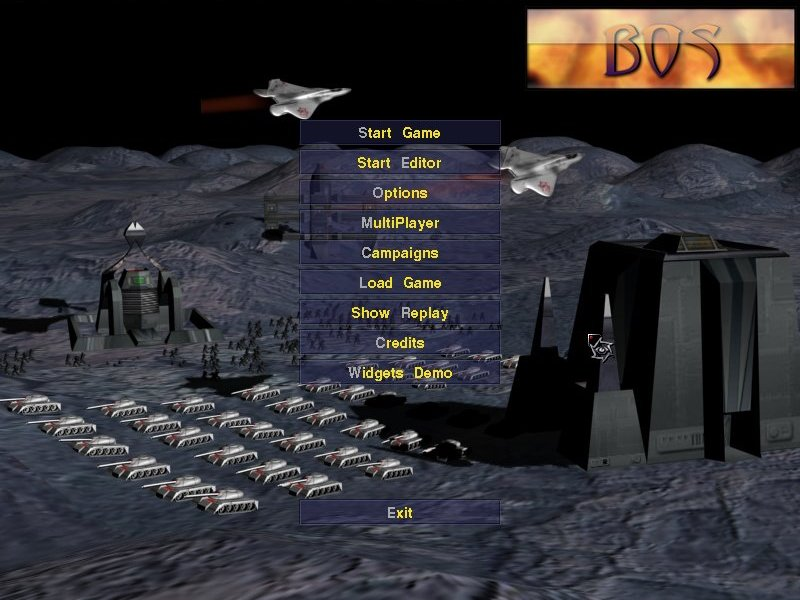
Bos Wars title scene (pre2.2.1)

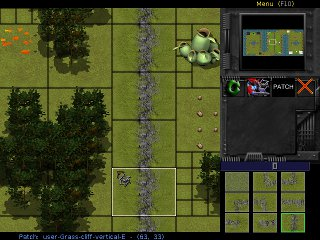
Bos Wars tile editor (v2.6.0)

Bos Wars is an open source, cross-platform real-time strategy video game. The game's engine is based on the open-source Stratagus engine, and is set in the future. The game allows the player to develop a war economy, managing energy and magma as resources, in order to build an army to combat their enemies.

== History ==
The project was started by Tina Petersen, as Invasion - Battle of Survival. When Petersen died in 2003, François Beerten became the project's leader. The first v1.0 public release was in March 2004. In June 2007, the Stratagus game engine was merged with BOS and the game became known as Bos Wars. There have been two releases in the last ten years, the most recent in 2023.

== Gameplay ==
The game map initially starts with a fog of war covering all areas which is not covered by the player's units range of view. As the units explore the map, the darkness is removed. Revealed areas which are not in view range are again darkened to hide enemy unit movement on those areas. All players have the same buildings and units. There is no research in the game so you can instantly build new buildings, aircraft, land vehicles and troops after you have collected enough resources to build them.

The resources in the game are magma and energy. Magma is gathered by engineers or harvesters from rocks or manufactured by magma pumps from hot spots. Energy is gathered by engineers or harvesters from trees or morels, or manufactured by power plants.

There are three types of structures: basic, unit, and defense. The basic structures are power plants, magma pumps, radar, cameras, and vaults. The unit structures are training camps, vehicle factories, hospitals and aircraft factories. Lastly, the defensive buildings are gun turrets, cannons, and missile silos.

== Technical features ==
The game is written in C++ and Lua with the SDL library. The game uses a game engine based on the Stratagus engine. Originally the game data structure was separated from the graphical engine, but it was merged into the game in 2007, and the Stratagus project was merged into the Bos Wars project shortly after the engine change.

Although an official central server has not been created yet, Bos Wars supports multiplayer online play provided that users are able to obtain the IP addresses of potential opponents. Certain websites allow users to swap IP addresses easily.

== Reception and impact ==
Bos Wars was on LinuxLinks "42 More of the Best Free Linux Games" list as well as their later top one hundred list. PC Advisor wrote in 2010: "Bos Wars is an entertaining game, but one that takes some time and effort to learn - it's strictly for those who like an RTS challenge". Amiga Future concluded that Bos War is a bit lethargic. It contains no background music and only limited sound. The art style has aged, animations are sparse and there is no attention to detail. The gameplay while easy to understand doesn't give satisfaction.

== See also ==
- List of open source games
- Stratagus
