= OpenMW =

Free and open-source game engine recreation

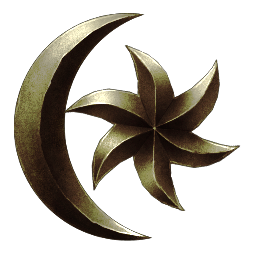

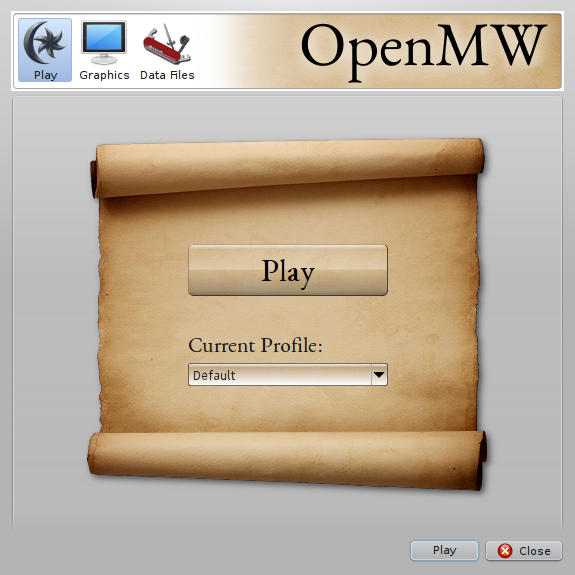
- Release: 0.1.0 / June 3, 2008; 18 years ago
- Stable release: 0.51.0 / June 19, 2026; 5 months ago
- Written in: C++
- Platform: Cross-platform
- Type: Game engine
- License: GNU General Public License (version 3 or later)
- Website: openmw.org
- Repository: gitlab.com/OpenMW/openmw

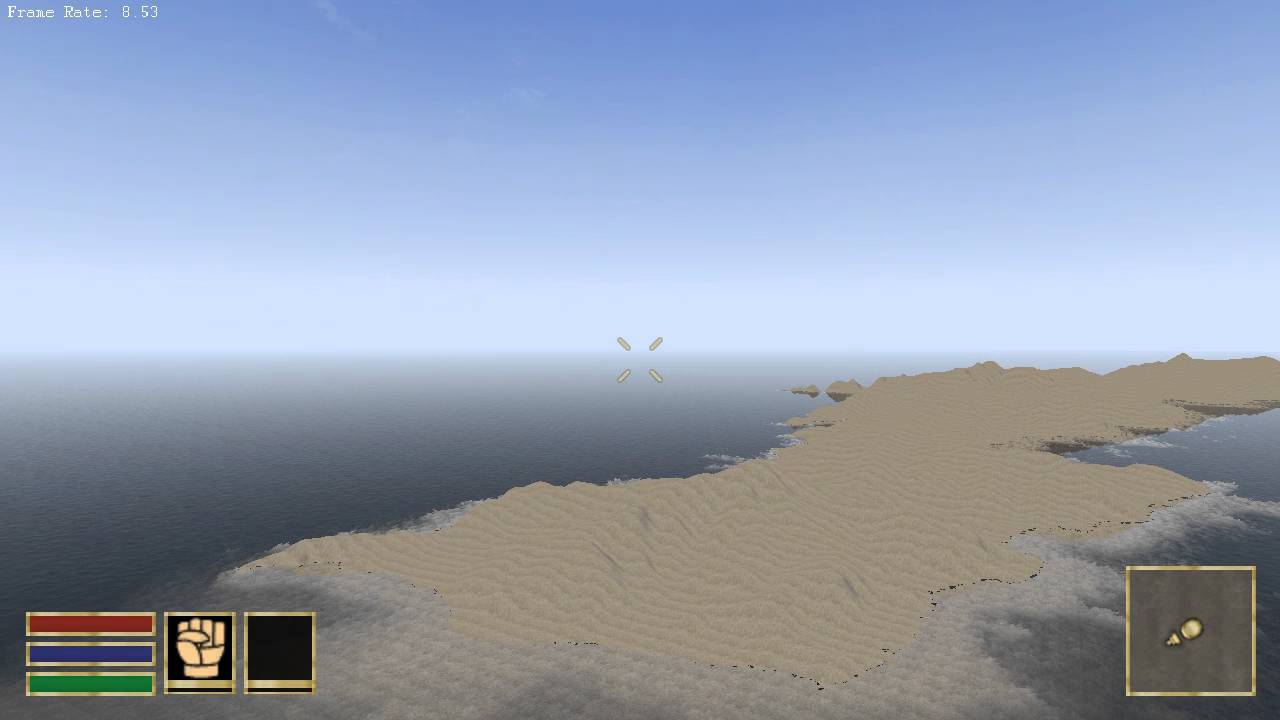
Screenshot of OpenMW with Example Suite content

OpenMW is a free and open-source game engine recreation that reimplements the one powering Bethesda Softworks' 2002 open-world role-playing game The Elder Scrolls III: Morrowind. The project addresses issues with the original Gamebryo engine and provides cross-platform support, improved performance, and enhanced modding capabilities while maintaining full compatibility with the original game's content and most third-party modifications.

The engine is programmed in C++ using modern open-source libraries and requires the original game assets to function, though it does not include copyrighted material from Bethesda. The project has expanded beyond its original scope, with development underway to support other Bethesda titles built on Gamebryo-based engines, including The Elder Scrolls IV: Oblivion, The Elder Scrolls V: Skyrim, and multiple Fallout titles.

== Overview ==
The project was initiated to address issues with Morrowind's original engine, which no longer receives official support or bug-fix updates. The OpenMW engine is programmed in C++ and uses the Bullet physics engine, OpenAL-Soft for audio, MyGUI for window widgets, and SDL 2 for input. The launcher and OpenMW-CS tool use Qt for their graphical user interfaces. All quests and character choices from Morrowind and its official expansions/add-ons are fully playable in OpenMW, as are many third-party mods.

As a game engine recreation, OpenMW relies on but does not include the original assets of the game, such as art, textures, music, and other Bethesda-copyrighted material. A copy of the original game in any edition, including the Game of the Year Edition, is required to play Morrowind in OpenMW. Side projects have been started to create free assets to accompany OpenMW, and the OpenMW-CS content-development tool can also be used without the need for any third-party assets.

Beginning around 2018, development efforts have explored expanding OpenMW beyond Morrowind to support other Bethesda titles built on Gamebryo-based engines. Early experimental work by a single programmer known as cc9cii focused on porting The Elder Scrolls IV: Oblivion and The Elder Scrolls V: Skyrim, with demo videos showcasing successful world loading into the engine as of February 2019. This experimental work has since evolved into official project goals. With the release of version 0.49.0 in July 2025 (described as the first release to go beyond Morrowind), the development team formally announced support for these Elder Scrolls titles alongside Fallout 3, Fallout: New Vegas, and Fallout 4.

== History ==
The first public release of OpenMW was version 0.1.0 in June 2008, initially using Ogre3D for rendering. The original lead developer, Nicolay Korslund, left the project early on but passed his roles to Marc Zinnschlag. In 2020, the team officially announced that Bret Curtis (also known as psi29a) took over the leadership role.

With the release of version 0.37.0, Ogre3D was replaced with OpenSceneGraph due to concerns about the future direction of Ogre3D's development. This switch brought significant performance improvements and fixed several long-standing issues in the engine.

Since 2016, all of the quests, classes, races, and other character choices of Morrowind and its official expansions and add-ons are fully playable in OpenMW, though it remains in extended beta testing as of 2017. Most third-party mods that are not dependent on any MS Windows executables and which are free of serious scripting syntax errors are also compatible with OpenMW.

In 2025, OpenMW expanded scripting features and compatibility with the original Morrowind engine, laying the groundwork for working with more games made by Bethesda such as Skyrim.

== TES3MP: multiplayer development ==
OpenMW is also the basis for TES3MP, an attempt to develop a networked, multiplayer version of the game. It was in early alpha testing as of 2017. In the middle of 2017, a major breakthrough was achieved and a first playable version was released. With the release of the 0.7 alpha in late 2018, the multiplayer fork now supported synchronization between players for most of the game's features, like making custom potions and enchantments, and thus became mostly feature-complete.
