= Jools Jameson =

British video game designer

Julian "Jools" Jameson (born 1968) is the CEO of Greenhill EnviroTechnologies Inc., based in Nova Scotia, Canada, having previously worked in England as a computer game developer, designer and producer. He was born in Sunderland, England.

== Greenhill EnviroTechnologies ==
Julian currently runs Greenhill EnviroTechnologies, which designs and develops electronic control systems for green technologies. The company's current Okapi product line, of sophisticated control systems for solar collectors, is featured on the Kickstarter website.

=== Okapi Product Line ===
- Okapi: a sophisticated control system for solar collector air heaters.
- Okapi 2: controller for two side-by-side solar collector air heaters (or one very large collector).
- Okapi 2.i: controller for two independent solar collectors.

== Game development ==
Jools' gaming career spanned some 20 years, starting in the early days of gaming "messing around" with machine code on the 6502-based Oric 1 and has programmed almost every home computer and console since.

The most prominent game of his career is Cannon Fodder, which he co-designed and programmed. Cannon Fodder 2 followed and, later in his career, he converted it onto the Game Boy platform (a project he initiated). This conversion included an FMV player, which he both designed and programmed, capable of streaming digital video and audio. The Game Boy conversion received a BAFTA nomination for sound and high review scores, including 93% from Official Nintendo Magazine and 96% from Nintendo Power.

Company	Game	Platform	Role
Tynesoft 1986–1988	Who Dares Wins II	C16; Plus/4	Programmer
Tynesoft 1986–1988	Future Shock	C16; Plus/4	Programmer
Tynesoft 1986–1988	Phantom	C16; Plus/4	Designer and programmer
Tynesoft 1986–1988	Spy VS Spy	C16; Plus/4	Programmer
Tynesoft 1986–1988	Frost Byte	Amiga; ST	Programmer
Tynesoft 1986–1988	Seconds Out	Amiga; ST	Designer and programmer
Rare 1989–1990	Taboo	NES	Designer and programmer
Rare 1989–1990	WWF Wrestlemania	NES	Designer and programmer
Tynesoft 1988–1989	Beverly Hills Cop	Amiga; ST	Co-programmer
Tynesoft 1988–1989	Circus Games	PC Engine	Designer and programmer
Sensible Software 1991–1995	Mega-lo-Mania	Mega Drive/Genesis	Programmer
Sensible Software 1991–1995	Cannon Fodder	Amiga; ST	Co-Designer and programmer
Sensible Software 1991–1995	Cannon Fodder 2	Amiga	Co-Designer and programmer
Sensible Software 1991–1995	Sensible Golf	Amiga	Programmer
Argonaut Games 1996–1997	Croc: Legend of the Gobbos	PlayStation; Saturn; Windows	Producer
Psygnosis 1998–1999	G-Police: Weapons of Justice	PlayStation	Senior Producer
Codemasters 1999–2004	Cannon Fodder	Game Boy Color; Game Boy Advance	Lead Programmer
Codemasters 1999–2004	LMA 2002	PS2; Xbox	Senior Programmer
