= Cannon Fodder 2 =

1994 video game

- Developer: Sensible Software
- Publisher: Virgin Interactive Entertainment
- Designer: Stuart Campbell
- Programmer: Jools Jameson
- Artists: Stuart Cambridge; John Lillee
- Writer: Stuart Campbell
- Composers: Richard Joseph; Jon Hare
- Series: Cannon Fodder
- Platforms: Amiga, MS-DOS
- Release: November 1994
- Genre: Shoot 'em up
- Mode: Single-player

Cannon Fodder 2: Once More unto the Breach, or simply Cannon Fodder 2, is an action-strategy shoot 'em up game developed by Sensible Software and published by Virgin Interactive for Amiga and MS-DOS in November 1994. The game is the sequel to Cannon Fodder, a successful game released for multiple formats in 1993. The game is a combination of action and strategy involving a small number of soldiers battling through a time-travel scenario. The protagonists are heavily outnumbered and easily killed. The player must rely on strategy and heavy secondary weapons to overcome enemies, their vehicles and installations.

The game retained the mechanics and gameplay of its predecessor but introduced new levels, settings and graphics. Former journalist Stuart Campbell designed the game's levels, making them harder and more tactically demanding, as well as introducing a multitude of pop culture references in the level titles. The development of the game's plot was hampered by budget constraints and the resulting lack of explanation confused reviewers. Critics enjoyed the gameplay retained from the original Cannon Fodder but were disappointed at the lack of new mechanics or weapons, comparing the game to a data disk. Reviewers praised the game's level design, though less so those of its alien planet. Critics gave Cannon Fodder 2 positive reviews but lower scores than its predecessor and gave mixed criticism of the new theme music and increased difficulty.

== Gameplay ==
Cannon Fodder 2 is a military-themed action game with strategy and shoot 'em up elements. The player controls a small squad of up to four soldiers. These soldiers are armed with machine guns which kill enemy infantry with a single round. The player's troops are similarly fragile, and while they possess superior fire-power at the game's outset the enemy infantry becomes more powerful as the game progresses. As well as foot soldiers, the antagonists include vehicles and missile-armed turrets. The player must also destroy buildings which spawn enemy soldiers. For these targets, which are invulnerable to machine gun fire, the player must use secondary, explosive weaponry: grenades and rockets. Ammunition for these weapons is limited and the player must find supply crates to replenish his troops. Wasting these weapons can potentially result in the player not having enough to fulfil the mission objectives. The player can opt to shoot crates – destroying enemy troops and buildings in the ensuing explosion – at less risk to his soldiers than retrieving them, but again at a greater risk of depleting ammunition.

The player proceeds through 24 missions divided into several "phases" each, making 72 levels in all. There are various settings including medieval, gangster-themed Chicago, an alien spacecraft and an alien planet. The player must also contend with mines and other booby traps. As well as shooting action, the game features strategy elements and employs a point-and-click control system more common to strategy than action games. As the player's troops are heavily outnumbered and easily killed, he must use caution, as well as careful planning and positioning. To this end, he can split the squad into smaller units to take up separate positions or risk fewer soldiers when moving into dangerous areas. In alternative settings, heavy weapons are replaced graphically by such units as battering rams (replaces trucks) and wizards (replaces rockets).

The game's plot – minimally expounded in the manual – concerns soldiers partaking in a Middle Eastern conflict (which forms the game's early levels) abducted by aliens to do battle on an alien world (which forms the later levels). During the process of space travel, the aliens send the soldiers to various times and places, resulting in the intervening medieval and Chicago settings.

== Development ==
The game is the sequel to Cannon Fodder, which drew criticism for its juxtaposition of war and humour and its use of iconography closely resembling the remembrance poppy. The cover art's poppy was ultimately replaced with a soldier, in turn replaced by a hand grenade for Cannon Fodder 2, regarding which Amiga Power joked: "The great thing about an explosive charge wrapped in hundreds of meters wound-inflicting wire is that it doesn't have the same child-frightening, 'responsible adult' freaking, society-disrupting effect as an iddy-biddy flower". The One felt the new historical and science-fiction themes an attempt to avoid similar controversy as befell Cannon Fodder. Amiga Power itself had become embroiled in the controversy due to its planned use of the poppy on its cover (also abandoned) and perceived inflammatory commentary its editor Stuart Campbell. Campbell later left the magazine to join Sensible Software as a programmer and worked on the sequel as his first game.

A small team of "essentially four" people – among them first-time level-designer Campbell – created the game, retaining the Cannon Fodder engine. Prior to Campbell's arrival from a journalism career, Sensible Software had devised the game's time-travelling theme and decided upon the various settings. However, it had not yet developed a plot to expound these themes. It was not possible to illustrate the story in the game itself, due to Cannon Fodder 2's simple nature and so Campbell began work on an elaborate "plot-to-be", partially completing a novella intended to accompany the final product. This version of the story had the time-travelling aliens plotting to intervene in various parts of human history to create chaos, which they intended to exploit to enslave and destroy humanity. The protagonists' kidnappers were envisioned as sympathisers who would send them through time to defend mankind. Virgin vetoed the proposal as too expensive and took charge of the manual's production. The result was a simplified explanation which described the soldiers as in the employ of the aliens and did not clarify the time-travel element. Campbell later said the loss of the novella was an example of a publisher preferring to maximise profit from a game rather than build intellectual property towards the end of the Amiga's commercial life.

As the game was to retain the same engine, the developers could not add new gameplay features. Campbell instead set out to make the levels more interesting, creating multiple paths through the missions. More obvious solutions would be more difficult, and the hidden, "proper" paths easier to execute once deduced. While Campbell intended the game to be harder, he also wished to improve the difficulty curve, which he argued was a flaw of its predecessor. He also tended to make the levels smaller and reduced instances of water obstacles, which he regarded as frustrating in the first game. The designer conceded that some levels turned out to be too difficult – due to his inexperience as a developer and the fact he became so skilled while play testing – but maintained that level 8 of the original was worse than any of his creations. Campbell named most of the game's levels after songs titles and lyrics (prominently The Jesus and Mary Chain), but also referenced wider pop culture artifacts such as gameshows and Bugs Bunny cartoons, as well as some original titles. He also referenced classic games in the level design itself.

At the time, Jon Hare said changing the formula would be detrimental, and unnecessary to provide enjoyment and value. He later reflected that Sensible had poorly managed the project in "delegating" the design to newcomer Campbell. He felt this to be a consequence of Sensible Software avariciously spreading itself thin, by that point attempting to exploit its success. Hare sold Sensible to Codemasters in 1999 and consequently worked on an abortive Cannon Fodder 3, with such a title ultimately published by Russia's Game Factory Interactive for the PC in 2012.

== Reception ==
Reception

Review scores
Publication	Score
Amiga Format	90%
Amiga Power	89%
CU Amiga	88%
The One	85%
Amiga User International	75%
Amiga Computing	71%

Cannon Fodder 2 retains the same mechanics and core gameplay of its predecessor, prompting reviewers to say: "It's still as wonderfully playable as it ever was", and to acknowledge "all the amazing control and playability" of the original. Reviewers complained about the lack of plot, with Amiga Power stating: "There's little explanation as to why you're doing this time-travelling and absolutely none in the game. As a result, the game doesn't hang together". AUI called the plot "pointless", while Amiga Computing called it a "slight problem", saying "you have to guess what is going on in the game because there's no plot explanation [...] it's all very confusing!"

The game is markedly more difficult than its predecessor. Amiga Format called this "good/bad news", whereas The One directed its "major criticism" at the difficulty level, saying that "some of the levels are quite simply horrendous", and that the game is "close to being intensely frustrating at times". Amiga Computing also felt the high difficulty to be the "biggest problem": "I like a game to get progressively harder rather than getting virtually impossible after just four missions". Amiga Format also criticised the difficulty and felt "some of the levels are a bit of a drag". Amiga Power was annoyed at the early tutorial missions, finding them redundant, but otherwise noted the increased challenge as a positive, and said: "The original game went in pulses of fiendishly hard and stupidly simple levels, but in CF2 the difficulty curve's, well, more of a curve". The reviewer praised the clever level design, explaining: "The levels penalise you for taking the obvious route and reward you for trying an obscure approach [...] loads of levels make you think before you move, injecting puzzle elements into the killing", citing the example of traps with empty vehicles as bait. The reviewer praised the smaller, tighter levels with a difficulty curve within those levels: "gung-ho" sections building to tactical play against tougher enemies. He compared this favourably with the first game: "The level design is consistently better", in particular the "Beirut, Mediaevil and Chicago levels look and play wonderfully". He nevertheless felt the thematic shifts lacked coherence and atmosphere.

The player's soldiers find themselves on an alien planet.

The game's alien planet levels drew much criticism, on which Amiga Computing opined "whoever chose the colour schemes should be thrown away in jail". While he praised their mechanics, Amiga Power's reviewer said: "I hate the entire look of the alien planet [...] From the disgusting purple pools to the silly flowers". Some reviewers enjoyed the graphics but felt there was no change between the two games. CU Amiga said "it's the same game started up with new graphics" as well as the new levels. Amiga Computing praised the new main theme music. Amiga Power said it was not as good as its predecessor and also pointed out that the in-game music remained the same as the original Cannon Fodder and had grown tiresome. The magazine questioned the lack of an option to disable it. Critics decried the lack of new weapons, pointing out that the original armaments and vehicles had merely been made to look different in the various settings, while behaving in the same manner.

Reviewers more generally criticised the similarity between Cannon Fodder and Cannon Fodder 2. The One, AUI, and Amiga Computing compared the new game to a "data disk" rather than a full sequel. Kieron Gillen later reflected that it would be called a "semi-sequel" or "stand-alone add-on pack" if released today. CU Amiga conceded that the designers could have added little new to such a simple game without tampering with the basic, successful mechanics; Sensible Software was accused of "laziness" by The One, and of "greed" by AUI.

While it awarded 90%, Amiga Power felt the game was poor value for money compared to the original, while CU Amiga said it was "still worth buying". AUI said the game was "a must" for those without the original, otherwise Cannon Fodder 2 is "basically exactly the same game as before", with the "saving grace" of new levels. Amiga Computing enjoyed the game but said it was not as good as expected and that there are "too many similarities and not enough differences to make this sequel a classic". The One summarised: "If you've got CF1, love it, and want seconds, only harder, look no further – but, if like myself you've played Cannon Fodder to death and would've liked to have seen the game developed in some way, I think you'll be a bit disappointed".
