= Cannon Fodder (video game) =

1993 video game

- Amiga cover art
- Developer: Sensible Software (Note: Ported to DOS by Audio Visual Magic, to CD32 by Arch Rivals, to Mega Drive by PanelComp, and to Game Boy Color by Codemasters)
- Publisher: Virgin Interactive Entertainment (Note: Published for Acorn Archimedes by Krisalis Software and for Game Boy Color by Codemasters)
- Designer: Jon Hare
- Programmer: Jools Jameson
- Artist: Stoo Cambridge
- Composers: Richard Joseph; Allister Brimble (SNES, Mega Drive, Jaguar)
- Series: Cannon Fodder
- Engine: Sensible Soccer (modified)
- Platform: Amiga: Super NES, Atari ST, 3DO, Amiga CD32, Acorn Archimedes, MS-DOS, Mega Drive, Atari Jaguar, Game Boy Color
- Release: 3 December 1993: Amiga; EU: 3 December 1993 Atari ST; EU: 1994 3DO; NA/EU: 1994 Super NES; EU: January 1995 Mega Drive; EU: 6 January 1995 Jaguar; NA: 24 February 1995; EU: February 1995; JP: 26 May 1995 Game Boy Color; EU: 24 November 2000; NA: 20 December 2000
- Genre: Shoot 'em up
- Mode: Single-player

Cannon Fodder is a 1993 shoot 'em up video game developed by Sensible Software and published by Virgin Interactive Entertainment for the Amiga. Virgin later ported the game to MS-DOS, Atari ST, Acorn Archimedes, Atari Jaguar, Mega Drive, Super NES and 3DO. The game is military-themed and based on shooting action with squad-based tactics. The player directs troops through numerous missions, battling enemy infantry, vehicles, and installations.

Cannon Fodder has a darkly humorous tone which commentators variously praised and condemned. Its creators intended it to convey an anti-war message, which some reviewers recognised, but the Daily Star and a number of public figures derided the game. Other reviewers highly praised the game, which widely achieved scores of over 90% in Amiga magazines. Amiga Action awarded it an unprecedented score, calling it the best game of the year. It was followed by the sequel Cannon Fodder 2 in 1994.

== Gameplay ==
Cannon Fodder is a military-themed action game with strategy and shoot 'em up elements. The player controls a small squad of up to a maximum of six soldiers, depending on the mission. These soldiers are armed with machine guns which kill enemy infantry with a single round. The player's troops are similarly fragile and while they possess superior firepower at the game's outset, the enemy infantry becomes more powerful as the game progresses. As well as foot soldiers, the antagonists include vehicles such as Jeeps, tanks and helicopters as well as missile-armed turrets. The player must also destroy buildings which spawn enemy soldiers. For these targets, which are invulnerable to machine gun fire, the player must utilise secondary, explosive weaponry: grenades and rockets. Ammunition for these weapons is limited and the player must find supply crates to replenish their troops. Wasting these weapons can potentially result in the player not having enough to fulfil the mission objectives. The player can opt to shoot crates – destroying enemy troops and buildings in the ensuing explosion – at less risk to their soldiers than retrieving them, but again at a greater risk of depleting ammunition.

The player proceeds through 24 missions divided into several levels each, making 72 levels in all. There are various settings including jungle, snow, and desert, some with unique terrain features and vehicles such as igloos and snowmobiles. The player must also contend with rivers (crossing which soldiers are slowed and cannot fire) and quicksand as well as mines and other booby traps. In addition to shooting action, the game features strategy elements and employs a point-and-click control system more common to strategy than action games. As the player's troops are heavily outnumbered and easily killed, they must use caution, as well as careful planning and positioning. To this end, they can split the squad into smaller units to take up separate positions or risk fewer soldiers when moving into dangerous areas.

== Development ==
Cannon Fodder was developed by Sensible Software, a small independent developer then of several years' standing, which had become one of the most prominent Amiga developers. Cannon Fodder – its working title from early in the development – was created after such successes as Wizkid, Mega Lo Mania and especially Sensible Soccer and was developed by six people in a "small, one-room office". It was rooted in Mega Lo Mania, the "basic idea" being – according to creator Jon Hare – a strategy game in which the player "could send groups on missions, but that was all really." The group nonetheless wanted to introduce action elements into the strategy ideas of Mega Lo Mania, giving the player "more direct" control, though retaining the mouse control and icons uncommon to shoot 'em ups.

In accordance with habit Sensible's personnel eschewed storyboards when developing the starting point, instead writing descriptions of the concept and core gameplay functions. Sensible made an early decision to employ its signature "overhead" camera. Development of the basic scrolling and movement was another early step. Individual programmers then worked on various parts of the design, with the team play-testing rigorously as it went, often discarding the results of its experiments: "The reason we make good games is that if we put something in that turns out crap, we're not afraid to chuck it out", said graphics designer Stuart Cambridge. Hare elaborated: "[We] constructively criticise what comes out, gradually getting rid of the naff ideas and keeping any good stuff. We change it again and again and again until we get what we want." A point of pride was the realistic behaviour of the homing missile code, while the rural setting of some of the levels was inspired by Emmerdale Farm. Earlier works-in-progress employed larger numbers of icons than would be featured in the final version. The mechanics also had more depth: individual soldiers had particular attributes – such as being necessary to use certain weapons or vehicles – and a greater capacity to act independently, both removed in favour of "instant" action rather than "war game" play. Final touches were the additions of the last vehicles and introductory screens.

The designers named each of the game's several hundred otherwise identical protagonists, who were also awarded gravestones (varying according to the soldier's attained in-game rank) displayed on a screen between levels. Of this "personalisation", Hare said: "The graves show that people died and their names mean they're not just faceless sacrifices". The theme was a departure from Sensible Software's usual non-violent games. Hare stated "I'm only happy with this one because it makes you think 'Yes, people really die'. We're not glamourising anything, I don't think." He said it was inspired by "all wars ever" and was "meant to be an anti-war thing". He felt it would make gamers "realise just how senseless war is" and for this reason was "the game we've always wanted to write". CU Amiga however perceived "a fairly sick sense of humour" and predicted "The mix of satire and violence is bound to get some people pretty heated about the way such a serious subject is treated".

Production of the game began in early 1991, but was then delayed as programmer Jools Jameson worked on Mega Drive conversions of other games. The proposed Cannon Fodder had been part of a four-game deal with Robert Maxwell's software publisher, which was liquidated after his death. Unusually for an independent developer, Sensible had little difficulty in finding publishers and after work resumed on the game, concluded a deal with Virgin in May 1993. The creators chose Virgin as it "seemed like a good bet" (Hare) as well as because of the straightforwardness of UK head Tim Chaney. Several months before its release, elements of the game were combined with Sensible Soccer, to create Sensible Soccer Meets Bulldog Blighty. This modified Sensible Soccer demo featured a mode of play that replaced the ball with a timed hand grenade. The magazine described it as a "1944 version of Sensible Soccer", though The Daily Telegraph compared it to the Christmas-time football match in 1914.

== Reception ==
=== Critical reception ===
Reception

Review scores
Publication	Score
Edge	9/10 (Amiga)
Electronic Gaming Monthly	7.75/10 (JAG); 8.875/10 (3DO)
GameFan	229/300 (Jaguar)
GamesMaster	92%
Next Generation	4/5 (3DO, PC, Jaguar)
Amiga Down Under	95%
Amiga Format	95%
Amiga Action	94%
Amiga Computing	94%
Amiga Power	94%
Amiga User International	93%
CU Amiga	93%
The One	93%
Amiga Force	90%

Amiga Action said the game was "easily" the best of the year. The magazine compared it favourably to Sensible Soccer, saying the latter was "arguably the most playable and enjoyable game ever seen [...] At least, that was probably the best, as at this moment in time I believe this release [Cannon Fodder] to better it in terms of, well, everything." The reviewer also wrote: "Only last month in my Frontier review, I stated that I had only given that game 93% because no game would ever be less than seven per cent from perfection. Sensible Software have forced me to eat those words almost immediately." Amiga Computing praised the theme track as one of the best of the year. The reviewer could not find fault with the game and claimed to have given himself a headache in the attempt. He called it "one of the most playable games you will ever play and also one of the most fun. A rootin' tootin' shoot 'em up of the highest order." Amiga Down Under said the game "rates highly on sheer entertainment value – a game you'll want to come back to time and time again". The reviewer's "only complaint" was that some of the missions verged "on the near-impossible". Amiga Format said "if there's one thing Cannon Fodder has in spades, it's addictability and killer playability." The magazine also praised the graphics ("Great backgrounds. Excellent characters. Plenty of necessary detail") and sound ("A theme tune that sticks in your head, sound effects that work a dream – superb.") The reviewer said the game was "Extremely thought provoking" and "a highly enjoyable foray into the intelligent side of wandering around the place doing it to them before they do it to you." He also said that despite the controversy, Cannon Fodder was "possibly the most anti-war game I've seen in a while."

Amiga Power's reviewer said "playing this game is now more important to me than eating, sleeping, or any other bodily function." He praised the "groovetastic" UB40-inspired theme song, realistic sound effects and "intuitive" controls and said "I can't find anything wrong with the game". He nevertheless wrote that the lack of a two-player prevented it from scoring 100%, as well as joking that "It's got a finite number of levels" and "Not even real life is worth 100%.” The game went on to be ranked the sixth best game of all time in the history of the magazine.

AUI also noted the lack of a two player option and said "23 missions will be completed sooner rather than later". The magazine however said "It is hard to criticise anything in Cannon Fodder" and "these are petty matters when compared to the sheer enjoyment of playing the game." CU Amiga wrote: "Cannon Fodder is the best thing since gunpowder. It's bloody brilliant. It's better than sex." The magazine praised the "toe-tapping" theme tune and "attention to sonic detail" in the sound effects. It noted the lack of order options but said "on the whole it's a very playable, very tough shoot 'em up". The One called the game "Sheer, unadulterated brilliance" and said "Cannon Fodder is quite simply one of the best strategy/action/shoot 'em ups to appear for ages." The writer praised the "damn fine humour" and said "I can't find anything wrong with it".

Amiga Format reported sales figures of over 100,000 for the game. Reviewing the Jaguar version, GamePro criticized that the control mechanics are imprecise and slow without the option of mouse control and that the small character graphics make it difficult to follow the action. However, they complimented the sound effects and concluded that "Despite its foibles, Cannon Fodder is a challenging contest that'll have you planning new strategies to overcome your failures." Like GamePro, the four reviewers of Electronic Gaming Monthly complained that the characters are too small, but highly praised the fun, addictive gameplay and the sense of humor and remarked that "Cannon Fodder stands high above the crowd of average Jaguar games." They later awarded Cannon Fodder Best Atari Jaguar Game of 1995. Citing the high level of bloodshed and selection of vehicles, a reviewer for Next Generation assessed, "Put simply, this is the best Jaguar game ever. Period."

The 3DO version also received overall positive reviews from Electronic Gaming Monthly, Next Generation and GamePro, with the critics largely reiterating the same praises and criticisms they gave to the Jaguar version. Electronic Gaming Monthly's review team, however, additionally remarked that the difficulty slope and accessibility make the game appealing to players of all skill levels.

Next Generation reviewed the PC version of the game and stated that "This sui generis froth of strategy and action swings the needle on the old 'Just-One-More-Game' meter just a little higher."

=== Accolades ===
In 2004, readers of Retro Gamer voted Cannon Fodder as the 61st top retro game. Cannon Fodder was included in the 2011 list of the best violent video games of all time by The Daily Telegraph, with a comment that "this got a lot of people very upset" but "it was a relentlessly playable game, filled with dark humour and cartoony graphics." That same year, Wirtualna Polska ranked it as the fifth best Amiga game. In 1995, Total! ranked the game 31st on their Top 100 SNES Games writing: "It's very different from other shooting games (mostly due to the unusual viewpoint) but it's a complete classic. It also works best with the Nintendo mouse." In the same year, MegaZone included the game in their Top 50 Games In History. They praised the game calling it an "Excellent war game." In 1996, GamesMaster rated the Amiga version 52nd in its "Top 100 Games of All Time."

=== Controversy ===
Original cover of Amiga Power for the issue covering the game, using graphics planned for the game

The game drew criticism in the Daily Star for its juxtaposition of war and humour, its showcasing in London on Remembrance Day and especially its use of iconography closely resembling the remembrance poppy. The newspaper quoted the Royal British Legion, Liberal Democrat MP Menzies Campbell and Viscount Montgomery of Alamein, calling the game offensive to "millions", "monstrous" and "very unfortunate" respectively. Virgin Interactive Entertainment initially defended the use of the poppy as an anti-war statement, which the Daily Star in turn dismissed as a "publicity writer's hypocrisy".

Amiga Power magazine became involved in the controversy because of its planned reuse of the poppy on the cover of an issue also to be released on Armistice Day. This had been changed in response to criticism in the Daily Star's original article, but the newspaper published another piece focussing on a perceived inflammatory retort by Amiga Power's editor Stuart Campbell: "Old soldiers? I wish them all dead." The article featured further quotes from the British Legion. The magazine apologised for including the comment although Campbell himself felt he was "entitled to an opinion" regardless of its insensitivity. The game was ultimately released with a soldier rather than a poppy on the box art, though the poppy was still displayed on the game's title screen. Amiga Power also changed its cover after "legal scrapes with the British Legion over whether a poppy is just a flower or a recognisable symbol of a registered charity." Stuart Campbell elsewhere pointed out that the game was ironically anti-war, while contemporary Amiga Format reviewer Tim Smith also praised the game as intelligently anti-war. Metro later acknowledged "a relatively profound statement on the futility of war" which had been unrecognised by the Daily Star. Kieron Gillen defended the game as ironic and anti-war in a retrospective. Amiga Computing reported the publicity as "perhaps the best advertising campaign" for which Virgin could have hoped.

== See also ==
- Cannon Fodder 2
- Cannon Fodder 3
- Syndicate – a contemporary video game with similar squad-based tactical shooting elements with strategy elements
