= Cauldron II: The Pumpkin Strikes Back =

1986 video game

- Cover art by Steve Brown depicting the Witch Queen, the game's antagonist
- Developer: Palace Software
- Publisher: Palace Software
- Designer: Steve Brown
- Programmers: Richard Leinfellner and Stan Schembri
- Composer: Richard Joseph
- Platforms: Amstrad CPC, Commodore 64, ZX Spectrum, Commodore Plus 4
- Release: 1986
- Genre: Platform
- Mode: Single-player

Cauldron II: The Pumpkin Strikes Back is a video game developed and published by British developer Palace Software as a sequel to their 1985 game Cauldron. The 2D platform game was released in 1986 for the ZX Spectrum, Commodore 64, and Amstrad CPC home computers. Players control a bouncing pumpkin that is on a quest of vengeance against the "Witch Queen". The roles of the two were reversed from the first game, in which the witch defeated a monstrous pumpkin.

Following the success of Cauldron, Palace employee Steve Brown began work on a sequel. To provide fans of the original title with a new experience, a very different style of gameplay was implemented for the sequel, although several minor features retained connections to the first. Inspired by the bouncing pumpkin character in Cauldron, Brown designed the game around the character's movement. The bouncing mechanic proved problematic for the programmers who were unable to perfect its implementation. Technical limitations also prevented them from implementing certain animations, such as turning pages of a book.

Cauldron II was first released on the Commodore 64. It was released in the following years on other systems and as re-releases. The game received praise, mainly for its audio-visuals, in video game magazines. Difficulty in handling the bouncing pumpkin's movement was a common complaint, although reviewers felt the overall package was of good value.

== Gameplay ==
The pumpkin bounces through the castle and encounters enemies. Game statistics (points obtained, magic points, and remaining lives) are tracked at the top.

In Cauldron, the protagonist was a witch who became the "Witch Queen" by defeating an enemy called the "Pumpking". In its sequel, players control a pumpkin that has survived the witch's ascent to power and seeks to defeat her. Cauldron II takes place in the witch's castle, and players control the pumpkin, moving it through the 2D game world that is shown as side views. Six magical items – a Goblet, Axe, Shield, Crown, Scissors, and Book of Spells – are scattered throughout the castle and when collected by the player character, augment the pumpkin's abilities, providing it with offensive and defensive capabilities. Collecting the items also allows the pumpkin to access the witch's chambers and cut a lock of her hair, which is required to defeat the witch and complete the game.

The protagonist traverses the castle by bouncing, and players control the pumpkin by manipulating the direction and height of its bounce. Similar to the previous game, Halloween-themed enemies, such as ghosts, monsters, and skeletons, inhabit the game world. Contact with an enemy drains the pumpkin's magic meter that also fuels the protagonist's offensive projectiles. The character dies once the meter is depleted. The pumpkin has a limited number of lives to continue the game, which ends once all of the pumpkin's lives have been expended. On continuing, the pumpkin reappears on the screen with a refilled meter.

== Development ==
The idea behind Cauldron II was that there should be a sufficient thread to link to the previous game, but that it should also present new ideas around the platform genre. A player would then be sufficiently assured that we'd done our best to create a new game, rather than fobbing them off with more of a successful formula.

— Stan Schembri on the design of Cauldron II

The success of Cauldron in 1985 prompted Palace Software to produce a sequel. Rather than recycle the previous game's design, the development team wanted to be innovative and implement new gameplay features. Steven Brown and Richard Leinfellner resumed their roles as designer and programmer respectively, while Richard Joseph handled the audio design and Stan Schembri programmed the Commodore 64 version.

Brown first drew inspiration from the final scene of Cauldron: the witch's fight against the Pumpking, which bounced around a room. He felt the bouncing pumpkin looked "cool" and decided to base the sequel's gameplay on this aspect. Although unsure about the idea, the other team members proceeded with development. Intended to mimic a bouncing ball, the pumpkin's movement could change direction only if force is applied to it while it is in contact with a surface that provides friction. This mechanic prohibited the pumpkin from changing directions while in mid-air and proved problematic for the programmers to implement. Issues included difficulties with collision detection, unpredictable movements that led to glitches, and trouble with the firing mechanism. The pumpkin's ability to fire projectiles was intended to provide offensive game mechanics to players. In early designs, however, the projectile inadvertently generated a force that changed the pumpkin's direction. The programmers tried to correct this but were unable to create a perfect solution.

As the gameplay designs were being implemented, Brown switched his focus to the game's aesthetics. Scenes from the game were sketched on storyboards to aid development. Cauldron II's game world, the witch's castle, was designed to resemble Palace Software's logo as an advertising tactic. Brown photographed separate screens of the game and assembled them into a complete map, showing the shape of his company's logo, for video game magazines. Enemy designs were similar to those in the previous game, based on the Halloween holiday. Brown envisioned a graphical effect for the game's narration, showing a book whose pages turned as the story is read, but the technical limitations at the time prohibited the implementation of such a visual effect. Brown also wanted the game's visuals to scroll seamlessly as the character moved through the game world but flick-screening (showing one section of the world at a time) was more feasible. As with the previous game, Brown created a Plasticine model of the witch character as a reference for a painting that was used for the game's box art. The group tested the game prior to release and deemed it too challenging. They reduced the difficulty level so that more players could complete the game.

Palace Software developed Cauldron II for three home computers: Amstrad CPC, Commodore 64, and ZX Spectrum. The game was first released for the Commodore 64, and then for the Amstrad CPC and ZX Spectrum. It was later re-released on the ZX Spectrum in 1989 by Telecomsoft under its Silverbird budget label. Cauldron II was also re-released with the first game as a compilation title for Amstrad CPC and ZX Spectrum computers. Decades later, the game was made available on the Antstream Arcade gaming platform. The Commodore 64 version was released first in December 2020; the ZX Spectrum version followed later.

== Reception ==
Reception

Review scores
| Publication | Score |
|---|---|
| Crash | 91% |
| Your Sinclair | 9/10 |

Awards
| Publication | Award |
|---|---|
| Crash | Crash Smash (August 1986) |
| ZX Computing Monthly | Monster Hit (August 1986) |

Cauldron II was well received by video game journalists upon its release. ZX Spectrum magazines Crash and ZX Computing Monthly awarded Cauldron II their top accolades: "Crash Smash" (Note: Starting with issue 17, Crash magazine designated games with an overall rating 90% and higher as a "Crash Smash".) and "Monster Hit", (Note: ZX Computing Monthly did not have numerical ratings and instead rated games on a qualitative scale with a monster motif based on entertainment, playability, and value.) respectively. Similar to the first Cauldron, praise from the video game press focused on the graphical quality and criticism directed at the gameplay was mixed. Computer and Video Games reviewer Paul Boughton praised the size of the game world but criticised the audio quality of the Amstrad CPC and ZX Spectrum versions, citing the limited capabilities of the two systems. In concluding his review, Boughton felt any version of the game would be worth purchasing. Phil South of Your Sinclair praised the game's presentation and design, calling the graphics "lovely" and the platform gameplay "original". ZX Computing' reviewer praised the audio-visuals and recommended the title for fans of the previous game.

A Crash magazine reviewer lauded the audio-visuals of the ZX Spectrum version and commented that the gameplay offered more than its predecessor's. The reviewer described Cauldron II as difficult but felt that the sense of accomplishment gained from successful completion outweighed the negative aspect. Computer Gamer's reviewer criticised the bouncing gameplay, citing unpredictable reactions and difficulty in navigating around tough enemies. Rich Pelley and Jon Pillar of Your Sinclair echoed similar comments. The ZX Computing reviewer criticised the bouncing aspect but praised the overall game design as enjoyable. Phil King, another Crash reviewer, praised the Silverbird re-release. He called the graphics "colourful" and "well-animated" and felt that the game was of good value despite its excessive difficulty. The commercial success of the two Cauldron games prompted Palace to give Brown more creative freedom for his following project, Barbarian: The Ultimate Warrior.

The game has received a positive retrospective reception decades after its release. Stefano Castelli of IGN Italy considered Cauldron II a challenging and well-balanced game, citing it as proof of Brown's excellent game design skill. He further noted that while Cauldron II was one of many collect-all-the-items platformers at the time, its quality was undeniable. Retro Gamer writer Craig Grannell described the game's difficulty as the "only real criticism". Italian developer Ivan Venturi recalled that his mentor—Francesco Carlà—defined the game as the standard Venturi should aim for when he was honing his skills to start Simulmondo.
