= Dragon's Breath =

Dragon's breath comes from mythology, as used to describe the ability of dragons to emit fire from their mouth.

Dragon's Breath, Dragon's breath, dragon breath or dragonbreath may also refer to:

- Dragon's breath (ammunition), a pyrotechnic shotgun shell
- Dragon's Breath (dessert), a dessert made with liquid nitrogen
- Dragon's Breath Cave in Namibia, with the largest non-subglacial underground lake in the world
- Dragon's Breath (chili pepper), one of the world's hottest chilli peppers
- Dragon's Breath Blue, a Canadian cheese
- An alternate title for the 1990 video game Dragon Lord
- Dragon's breath, a form of fire breathing
- Dragon breath, a slang term for bad breath (halitosis)
- Dragonbreath, a series of children's books by Ursula Vernon
