= Brutal Sports Football =

1993 video game

- Developer: Teque London
- Publishers: Millennium Interactive; Telegames (Jaguar)
- Programmers: Alistair Mann; Colin Hughes; Peter Jefferies
- Artists: Antony Hager; Ian Stevens
- Composer: Richard Joseph
- Series: Brutal Sports
- Platforms: Amiga, MS-DOS, Amiga CD32, Atari Jaguar
- Release: October 1993: Amiga; EU: October 1993 MS-DOS; EU: 1993 CD32; EU: 1994 Jaguar; NA: August 22, 1994; EU: September 1994
- Genre: Sports
- Modes: Single-player, multiplayer

Brutal Sports Football is a 1993 sports video game developed by Teque London and originally published by Millennium Interactive for the Amiga. It was re-published for MS-DOS and Amiga CD32, and later became the first third-party title published for the Atari Jaguar. The first entry in the Brutal Sports series, the game is a fictional style of football played against human or computer-controlled opponents. It features a different take on american football by emphasising the violent aspect of the sport.

The studio began production in 1992, initially building a beat 'em up role-playing game, and later deciding that a fictional sport would be easier for audiences to understand. During play testing, the staff decided to emphasize the violent aspects of the sport. Critical reception for Brutal Sports Football has varied depending on the platform; praise was given to the visuals, gameplay, and multiplayer, but others expressed mixed opinions regarding the audio and violence. Some reviewers also criticized the choppy scrolling and confusing action. The game was followed by Wild Cup Soccer (1994).

== Gameplay ==
Brutal Sports Football features moderated graphic violence, and the field deteriorates with constant attacks from players (Amiga version shown).

Brutal Sports Football is a seven-a-side sports game reminiscent of Pigskin 621 A.D. and Mutant League Football (1993), described as a cross between rugby, football, and soccer. The game takes place in a post-apocalyptic futuristic setting where genetically engineered teams replaced humans in the Brutal Football League. There are eleven teams in total, including Vikings, lizards, wild goats and rhinos.

Players compete against each other or computer-controlled opponents, selecting from three modes of play: Unfriendly, Knockout, or League. Unfriendly is a standard single match mode for one or two players. Knockout is a tournament-style mode where eight teams battle in a competition. League is the main single-player mode, where the player competes in a league of rival teams across four seasons. In this mode, each team has nine players and two of them are substitutional. Depending on their performance, players are rewarded with money that can be used to manage their team, heal damaged teammates, and purchase other bonuses. Only the Vikings are playable in both League and Knockout modes, while the lizards, wild goats and rhinos are only playable in Unfriendly mode. A password is given to resume progress.

The gameplay is based on various types of football rules, including tackles, and an oval-shaped football that is kicked through a goal post. The game is unique in emphasizing violence, however, as there are no rules against excessive force. The players can hit or kill opponents, while items and weapons are randomly scattered across the playfield. Victory is awarded to the team with more points after a time limit of seven minutes, or the team that kills six of the seven teammates on the opposing team. If the match is not over after seven minutes, the players go immediately into sudden death where six out of seven opponents must be killed.

== Development ==
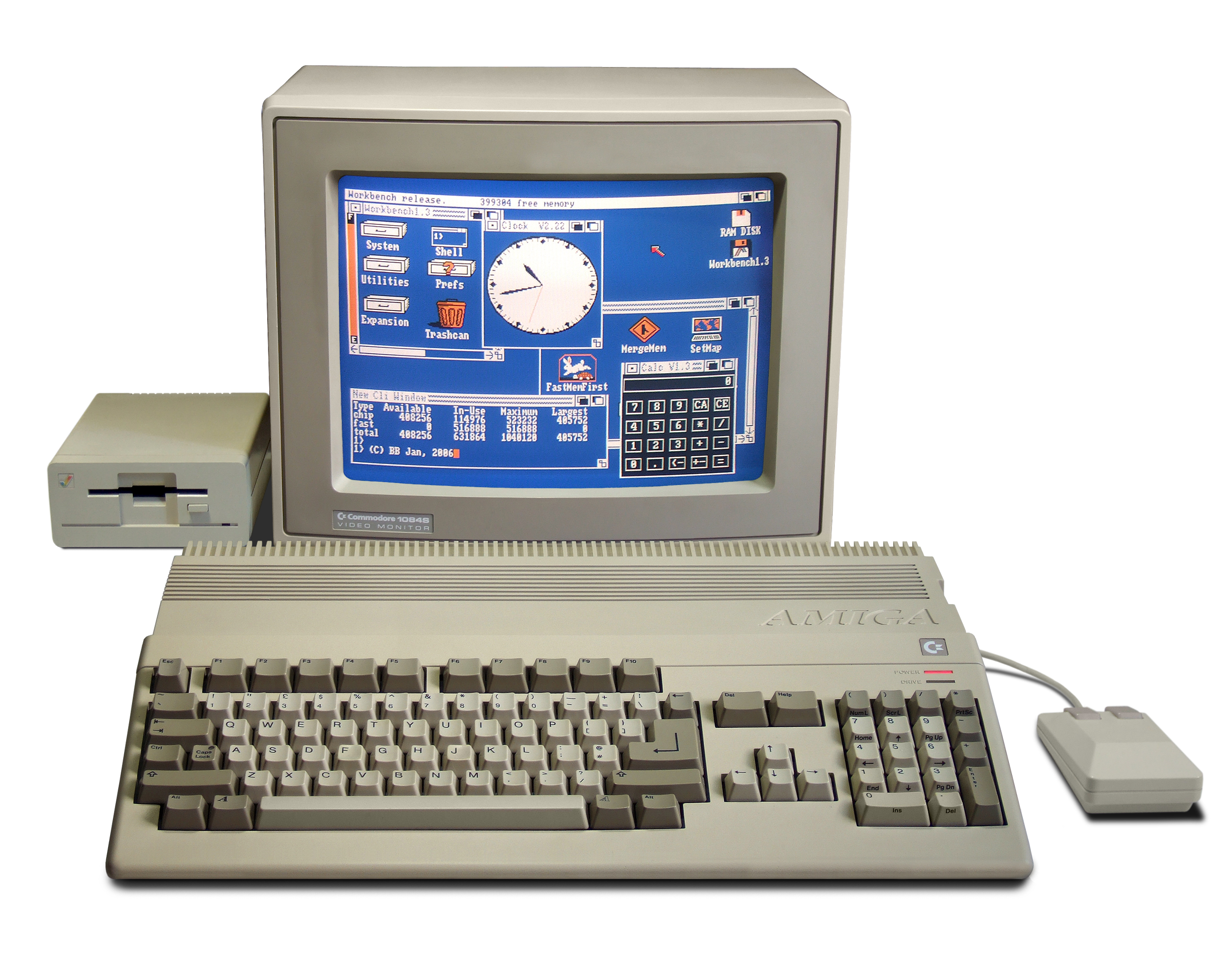
Brutal Sports Football began production on Amiga as a beat 'em up role-playing hybrid, before being reworked as a sports title instead.

Brutal Sports Football is the first entry in the Brutal Sports series developed by Teque London, which previously worked on Shadowlands and Shadoworlds (1992). Alistair Mann, Colin Hughes, and Peter Jefferies acted as co-programmers, with Barry Costas serving as technical adviser. Anthony "Tony" Hager was responsible for the graphics, with Ian "FAD" Stevens providing additional graphics. The soundtrack was composed by Richard Joseph.

The project entered production for the Amiga platform in June 1992, first intended as a beat 'em up role-playing game hybrid called Axequest. Hager stated that the staff liked the initial concept, but felt that it would have been "too different to catch on". The team was forced to produce another original title, avoiding anything "too far" from their target audience's understanding, thus settling on a sports game with beat 'em up elements. Although the game was not intended to be violent, the staff decided to make it an integral part of the game as playtests became more enjoyable. Seeing potential in the game, publisher Millennium Interactive commissioned Teque with additional versions for PC and consoles.

== Release ==
The game was first announced as Beastball, initially slated for launch between June and November 1993. In October, Millennium Interactive published the game for Amiga under its final title, Brutal Sports Football. In Germany, it was released as Crazy Sports Football. It was later ported to MS-DOS and Amiga CD32. In 1994, an Atari Jaguar port was published in North America on August 22 and in Europe on September by Telegames, being the first third-party title for the platform. The Jaguar version was also distributed in Japan by retailer Messe Sanoh. In 1995, the Amiga and CD32 versions were re-released as budget titles. In 2019, the DOS version was re-released via Steam. Versions for Sega Mega Drive/Genesis and Super Nintendo Entertainment System were announced to be in development. Both ports were due to be published in North America and Europe, but neither was released until a prototype ROM image of the Genesis version was leaked online in 2011.

== Reception ==
Reception

Review scores
Publication	Score			
Publication	Amiga	Atari Jaguar	CD32	DOS
Aktueller Software Markt	9/12	N/A	10/12	N/A
Amiga Action	87%	N/A	N/A	N/A
Amiga Computing	90%	N/A	72%	N/A
Amiga Force	94/100	N/A	N/A	N/A
Amiga Format	77%	N/A	81%	N/A
Amiga Power	88%	N/A	78%	N/A
Amiga User International	78%	N/A	N/A	N/A
Computer and Video Games	80%	80%	N/A	N/A
GameFan	N/A	71/100	N/A	N/A
Joystick	86%	N/A	N/A	84%
ST Review	N/A	84%	N/A	N/A
Amiga CD32 Gamer	N/A	N/A	55%	N/A
Atari ST User	N/A	90%	N/A	N/A
CU Amiga	85%	N/A	75%	N/A
The One Amiga	88%	N/A	82%	N/A
PC Joker	N/A	N/A	N/A	72%
PC Player	N/A	N/A	N/A	24/100
Score	N/A	N/A	N/A	25%
Top Secret	9/10	4/5	N/A	N/A
VideoGames	N/A	7/10	N/A	N/A

Brutal Sports Football garnered generally favorable reception from critics. Amiga Computing's Simon Clays praised the audio, well-defined sprites, and variety of ways to injure an opponent. Amiga Action's John Archer felt that the game "could have been a classic" for its humor, violence, sound effects, and multiplayer, but faulted its graphics and single-player mode. Joystick's Jérôme Bonnet gave positive remarks to the gore, multiplayer, and number of leagues, but panned the game's choppy scrolling.

The One Amiga's Matt Broughton lauded the game's audiovisual elements, and artificial intelligence. Amiga Force's Miles Guttery and Ian Osborne praised its multiplayer and overall playability, while describing the game's blood and violence as "a bad taste cartoon. Amiga Format's Marcus Dyson described the game as "less of a team sport, more of a gang war", while praising its audiovisuals and accessible gameplay. Amiga Power's Steve McGill gave positive remarks to the team's animations, humor, violence, and gameplay, but also noted that it was occasionally difficult to distinguish the action during hectic moments.

CU Amiga's Jon Sloan enjoyed the game's fast pace, audio, and "chunky" graphics, but criticized the "exceedingly dodgy" scrolling. Amiga User International (AUI) commended its visuals, but criticized the "iffy" sound and player selection. They also felt that the game looked confusing in crowded moments. Aktueller Software Markt (ASM) noted its exaggerated violence, while Computer and Video Games gave Brutal Sports Football positive remarks for its audiovisual presentation and playability. Multiple reviewers compared the game to Speedball 2: Brutal Deluxe (1990), with McGill being more favorable, and Archer and AUI being more critical.

The MS-DOS version received a mixed response from reviewers. Vincent Solé of Joystick praised the cartoonish violence, humor, and items, but found flaws with the character animations, scrolling, and confusing action. PC Joker's Manfred Duy expressed mixed thoughts with the game's audiovisual presentation but commended its controls. PC Player's Heinrich Lenhardt deemed its controls and gameplay as dull, and found its crude presentation to be flat.

=== CD32 ===
The Amiga CD32 version was met with average critical sentiments from press compared to the original Amiga release. Broughton commended the CD32 release for its improved controls and addition of new music, but noted that the upgraded graphics were jerky. Stephen Bradley of Amiga Format also faulted the scrolling, as well as the intrusive music and the obscurity of the game ball. Stephen Enstone of CU Amiga criticized the scrolling in parts, particularly when a large crowd of players are scrambling for the ball.

Amiga CD32 Gamer's Mark Wynne faulted the CD32 version for its "clumsy" presentation, irritating weapons, slow pacing, and repetitive gameplay. Tina Hackett of Amiga Computing recommended the game, noting its mixture of american football and beat 'em up action. Hackett also gave the CD32 release positive remarks for the additional graphical details, enhanced sound effects, and rock music. Stuart Campbell of Amiga Power regarded the CD32 version as an enjoyable sports simulator, but felt it was not as playable as Speedball 2 and criticized the "annoying" soundtrack. ASM found the CD32 conversion similar to the original Amiga version.

=== Jaguar ===
The Atari Jaguar version garnered average reception from reviewers. GameFan regarded the Jaguar release as a unique and fun sports game, citing its music, controls, and colorful visuals. Regardless, they complained that it sounded and played like a 16-bit title for the Super NES or Sega Genesis. Writing for Atari ST User, Hackett lauded the Jaguar port for its detailed visuals, soundtrack, and gore. She also proclaimed the Jaguar port was faster and smoother than the computer iterations. Mark Patterson of Computer and Video Games gave the Jaguar conversion positive remarks for its fast action and gameplay, recommending playing the game in two-player mode. Reviewing the Jaguar version, VideoGames' Eric Nakamura commended its audiovisual presentation and easy-to-learn controls, but noted the game's choppy scrolling and small characters.

GamePro's Daniel Thomas MacInnes labeled it as one of the best games on the Jaguar, highlighting the game's use of color and music to establish its violent theme, but saw the average-sized characters, choppy scrolling, and static background crowd as visual flaws. ST Review's Nial Grimes praised the Jaguar version for its "slick" presentation and playability, but criticized the uninspired music and awkward power-ups. Tytus of Polish publication Top Secret criticized the game's music, but gave it overall positive remarks for its sound effects and animated visuals. In a retrospective outlook of the Jaguar port, author Andy Slaven expressed that the "choppy framerates and very stupid computer opponents sideline the detailed graphics and good control".
