= Rum Runner (disambiguation) =

A rum runner is a person or ship engaged in the illegal business of smuggling alcoholic beverages.

Rum Runner may also refer to:

- Go-fast boat, a type of boat used for smuggling illicit alcoholic potables
- Rum Runner (nightclub), a nightclub in Birmingham, England
- Rum Runners or Boulevard du Rhum, a 1971 French-Italian-Spanish adventure film directed by Robert Enrico

== See also ==
- Rimrunners (disambiguation)
