= James Pond 3 =

1993 video game

James Pond 3: Operation Starfish
- Mega Drive cover art
- Developer: Vectordean
- Publishers: Millennium Interactive (Amiga); Electronic Arts (Mega Drive); U.S. Gold (Game Gear, SNES)
- Producer: Kevin Shrapnell
- Designer: Chris Sorrell
- Programmer: Chris Sorrell
- Artists: Sean Nicholls; Leavon Archer; Chris Sorrell
- Composer: Richard Joseph
- Platforms: Mega Drive, Amiga AGA, Amiga CD32, Super NES, Game Gear
- Release: 1993
- Genre: Platformer
- Mode: Single-player

James Pond 3: Operation Starfish (stylized as Operation Starfi5h, after the fictional secret service F.I.5.H) is a 1993 video game for Mega Drive, Amiga and Amiga CD32, Super NES and Game Gear. It is the third and last game in the James Pond series. It is also the only one that was only released for AGA Amigas: the Amiga 1200, Amiga 4000 and CD32.

The game's working title was James Pond 3: Splash Gordon, a play on Flash Gordon. Although it enjoyed good sales, it was not as well received as other games in the series.

== Gameplay ==
In-game screenshot (Amiga)

The gameplay in Operation Starfish is similar to Super Mario World. The map of the Moon consists of many levels connected with pathways. The levels are grouped into sections themed after dairy products including cheese, custard, ice cream and more, with each section culminating in a boss fight. Many stage names are a play on words, such as "The Garden of Edam" for the first level (named after the Garden of Eden). A unique twist to the standard "Super Mario"-style gameplay is that Pond's magno-boots allow him to run up walls. Once on a ceiling, James Pond will only fall down if he jumps off, and some levels have sections which the player must navigate in this upside-down fashion. Although Pond can no longer stretch his body upwards as he could in the preceding game, many levels give the player gadgets that allow James Pond to travel a great distance upwards.

Pond can run, jump and punch as standard moves. He can also use a wide array of items that he encounters, such as spring shoes, fruit guns and dynamite. By finding a special icon, players can play as Finnius the Frog, as long as he has been rescued in a certain level. A cheat code allows the player to play as Finnius in all levels. Finnius can bounce repeatedly on his belly to jump increasingly high in the air, but cannot use any gadgets except for chattering teeth.

The goal of each level is to find one of its communication beacons and break it. Some levels have beacons that will not activate until four colored teacups are found and collected by the player. Many levels have a hidden pickup that will reveal a secret route once the level is completed, in a similar fashion to the secret exits in Super Mario World. Finding at least some of the secret levels is essential to finishing the game successfully. The player is informed that they need to destroy all of Dr. Maybe's Cheese Mines; however, this will not give the full ending once the final level is beaten. Certain levels contain "Stiltonium" extractors that Dr. Maybe is using to produce a superweapon; these need to be destroyed in addition to the cheese mines to in order to finish the game completely.

=== Gadgets ===
- Dynamite: Dynamite ignites immediately upon being picked up. After the fuse has burned down, the resulting explosion will destroy certain blocks or TNT boxes. It will also kill any enemy or damage the player.
- Bomb: Similar to dynamite, but the fuse will only start to burn once the bomb is thrown.
- Fruit Gun: While fruit can be picked up and thrown at enemies, revealing fruit from a block while Pond has the fruit gun allows it to be loaded as upgraded ammunition. Different foods produce different results. For example, a cupcake acts as a homing missile.
- Fruit Suit: Fruit Suits will protect the player from 2 or more enemy attacks. They also provide the ability to walk through hot liquids such as custard without taking damage.
- X-ray specs: Causes hidden blocks to appear as translucent blocks.
- Spring Shoes: When wearing these, Pond can repeatedly bounce to achieve incrementally higher heights.
- Television: Once broken, the television releases a small ghost, which attempts to get back into the TV set. By holding the broken television, the player can bounce repeatedly on the ghost as it tries to get back inside.
- Jetpack: A device with a rocket thruster that can propel Pond into the air. Fuel cans will refill the jetpack's fuel reserve. The jetpack is also equipped with a powerful yogurt cannon.
- Finnius: Once rescued from a certain level, Finnius can be played by finding an icon with his face on. Hitting the icon again will revert the player's control to Pond.

== Plot ==
Following his defeat in RoboCod, the evil Dr. Maybe learns of the high quality cheese that lies on the Moon. Hiring a workforce of rats, Dr. Maybe begins mining the moon for cheese so he can conquer the global markets and fund his operations. In order to stop Dr. Maybe, James Pond, along with his new sidekick, Finnius Frog, journey to the Moon in order to put a stop to Dr. Maybe's mining operations.

== Unreleased ports ==
An Atari Jaguar version was being developed by Millennium Interactive and planned to be published by Telegames. This version was never released due to the disappearance of the sub-contracted programmer of the port and its associated code after development began. The OCS/ECS Amiga version was cancelled as the levels were too large to fit within one megabyte of RAM.

== Reception ==
Amiga reviews were mixed. Reviews praised the number and scale of the levels, but some expressed disappointment with black background and "fiddly" gameplay.

Reception

Review scores
Publication	Score
Amiga Format	75% (Amiga 1200)
Amiga Power	46% (Amiga 1200)
Hyper	87% (SMD)
Official Nintendo Magazine	65/100 (SNES)

In 1995, Total! ranked the game 99th on its Top 100 SNES Games writing: "This smooth platformer is big and challenging. The fluid gameplay gets repetitive after a bit though."

== See also ==
- The Moon is made of green cheese
