= Simulman (video game) =

- Developer: Simulmondo
- Publisher: Simulmondo
- Platforms: Amiga, MS-DOS
- Release: 1993-1994 (11 episodes)
- Genre: Action-adventure
- Mode: Single-player

Simulman, created by Francesco Carlà, is a series of action-adventure video games published in 1993-1994 by the Italian software house Simulmondo as a monthly series on newsstands, for Amiga and MS-DOS. It was released on March 20, 1993, alongside other similar Simulmondo series that were based on popular comics (Diabolik, Dylan Dog, Tex Willer), while Simulman was the first original setting. All the episodes, along with those of Diabolik, were also released in a collection on CD-ROM.

== Plot ==
In 2021, many people spend most of their time within the various worlds of virtual reality. Virtual crimes are also on the rise, for which a special police force has been created, of which Simulman is the best agent. The most dangerous enemy of Simulman is SS-DOS, an anthropomorphic operating system (a parody of MS-DOS), which has great power over simulated networks; Simulman meets him in several episodes of the series, without facing him directly. SS-DOS specifically controls a scary place called Doors, a set of doors on negative virtual worlds that suddenly open and swallow virtual beings and people. The best ally of Simulman is Cactus, a big man who in the real world is forced into a technological wheelchair.

In this universe the popular communication tools are the TWatch, a portable scanner that digitizes a human being; TV Tel, a mixture of telephone and computer; TV Fax, a portable office; Vrrrr, a videophone (all futuristic objects for the era of publication). Simulman drives a restored Ferrari, also with dematerializing tendencies. In the virtual worlds he also meets the Simuloids and the Virtuss, immaterial police corps not always with public order tasks.

== Gameplay ==
The events are narrated by sequences of mostly static images, with texts overwritten in Italian, on scenarios often in a cyberpunk style. The player’s choices are made with multiple choice menus or even with icons in further episodes. In the direct action stages, the player controls Simulman shown with a side view, in environments formed by a set of screens linked to a maze. In these stages the character can walk and run horizontally, jump, use doors, use any weapon, recall its status and inventory.

== Titles in the series ==
1. Simulman!
2. Nella morsa di SS-DOS
3. Nel regno di Doors
4. Il mondo simulato
5. I rapitori di sogni
6. Luna park
7. Il grande freddo
8. Il giardino virtuale
9. Il giocattolaio
10. Pentagram
11. Jailhouse Rock

== Storylines ==
- In episode 1, Simulman investigates a presidential candidate, which is actually a simulation controlled by SS-DOS.
- In episodes 4 and 5, Simulman is contacted by a woman to investigate the disappearance of her husband, a certain Jonathan Starck, who works in the door of an unreliable character, Mago.
- In episode 6, Simulman is contacted to investigate the sabotage of an amusement park
- In episode 7, the main character has to stop a criminal organization selling a new drug.
- In episode 8, Simulman investigates the disappearance of some members of door 23S, created by the insane Zeuss.
- In episode 9, the owner of the ARCADE door, Galadriel, asks Simulman to investigate the door sabotage.
- In Episode 10, Simulman investigates the disappearance of members of a new door named Pentagram and created by a mysterious character, San Christopher.
- In episode 11, Simulman takes the form of a criminal, Redbrick, to work undercover to investigate the disappearance of an infiltrator in the maximum security prison where SS-DOS is also located.

== See also ==
- Simulmondo
- Time Runners

== Bibliography ==
- Baratto, Giorgio (1993). "Simul...taneamente". K (in Italian) (47). Milan: Glénat: 52–53. ISSN 1122-1313.
- "Simulman". MCmicrocomputer (in Italian) (126). Rome: Technimedia: 224–226. 1993. ISSN 1123-2714.
- original manuals of some episodes (in Italian), Simulmondo, 1993
