= Rimrunners (disambiguation) =

Rimrunners or variations thereof may refer to:

- Rimrunners, a science fiction novel by C. J. Cherryh
- Rim Runners, a spacefaring shipping line in A. Bertram Chandler's fictional universe
- Rim Runner, a Las Vegas water ride
- Rimrunner, a Commodore 64 game released in 1988
