= Wild Cup Soccer =

1994 video game

- Developer: Teque London
- Publisher: Millennium Interactive
- Series: Brutal Sports
- Platforms: Amiga, Amiga CD32
- Release: EU: June 30, 1994
- Genre: Sports
- Modes: Single-player, multiplayer

Wild Cup Soccer is an association football video game developed by Teque London and published by Millennium Interactive for the Amiga and CD32 in 1994. It is the successor to Brutal Sports Football (1993).

== Gameplay ==
Wild Cup Soccer is a sports game.

== Development and release ==
A conversion was in development and planned to be published by Telegames for the Atari Jaguar but was never released.

== Reception ==
Reception

Review scores
Publication	Score	
Publication	Amiga	CD32
Amiga Action	84%	N/A
Amiga Computing	50%	N/A
Amiga Format	25%	N/A
Amiga Power	14%	18%
Computer and Video Games	80%	N/A
Génération 4	67%	N/A
Amiga CD32 Gamer	N/A	65%
Amiga Concept	67%	N/A
Amiga Dream	82%	N/A
Amiga Games	17%	18%
Amiga Joker	N/A	67%
CU Amiga	80%	N/A
Datormagazin	N/A	2/5
Games World	35/100	N/A
The One Amiga	81%	N/A
Play Time	17%	14%

Wild Cup Soccer garnered mixed reception from critics.

=== CD32 ===
The Amiga CD32 version was met with generally unfavorable reviews compared to the original Amiga release.
