= Maria Whittaker =

English former glamour model, Page 3 girl and singer

- Born: 7 October 1969 (age 57); Hounslow, Middlesex, England
- Other name: Maria Tafari
- Occupations: Glamour model; singer
- Height: 5 ft 5 in (1.65 m)
- Spouse: Michael West
- Children: 3

Maria Whittaker (born 7 October 1969), also known as Maria Tafari, is a former glamour model, Page 3 girl, and pop singer.

== Modelling career ==
Born on 7 October 1969 in Hounslow, Middlesex, Whittaker has described herself as a shy teenager. She began glamour modelling after her mother sent her photo to the Yvonne Paul modelling agency, but asked her father not to look at any of her topless pictures. She made her Page 3 debut in The Sun in 1985, aged 16, and went on to become one of the most popular Page 3 models of the era. She was named The Sun's Page 3 Girl of the Year in 1989. She also appeared in a variety of men's magazines. Her younger sister Lisa also had a brief career as a Page 3 girl, and the sisters posed together for topless photo shoots.

At age 18, Whittaker bought her parents a house in Twickenham, London, from her modelling income. Saying that she was "fed up of being the centre of attention" and "wanted a peaceful life", she ceased glamour modelling at age 21 to become an au pair.

== Music and television ==
Whittaker appeared as a Hill's Angel in two episodes of The Benny Hill Show in 1983; she appeared opposite Benny Hill in the 1987 music video for Genesis' Anything She Does as a Page 3 pinup girl trying to sneak into the concert.

In 1986, she had a cameo role in the movie version of Whoops Apocalypse. She made her second screen appearance in the thriller film Tank Malling in 1989.

Whittaker formed the band Rhythm Zone in 1990, with her as lead vocalist. The band was short-lived, releasing one unsuccessful single named "Stop Right Now (Take My Number)" (UK No. 163).

== Video game covers ==
Whittaker, together with Michael Van Wijk, appeared semi-nude on the cover of the 1987 video game, Barbarian: The Ultimate Warrior. Later, Whittaker appeared on the cover of the 1989 sequel Barbarian II: The Dungeon of Drax which featured a similarly named playable character called Princess Mariana.

== Personal life ==
Whittaker is married to Michael West, better known as record producer Rebel MC and Congo Natty. The couple have three children. Trinity Tafari, their youngest child, is a world champion at street dance, and is a part of dance group IMD, which has been featured on Got to Dance and Britain's Got Talent.

Whittaker now works as a Sales Coordinator for the multi-level marketing dietary supplement brand Juice Plus, which she promotes through her social media.
