= The Evil Dead (video game) =

1984 video game

- Developer: Palace Virgin Gold
- Publisher: Palace Software
- Designers: Richard Leinfellner; Keith Miller
- Platforms: BBC Micro, Commodore 64, ZX Spectrum
- Release: EU: 1984
- Genre: Adventure
- Mode: Single-player

The Evil Dead is an adventure game produced by Palace Software for the Commodore 64, BBC Micro, and ZX Spectrum. Based on the 1981 horror film of the same name, it was the first officially licensed Evil Dead video game. The ZX Spectrum version was never released on its own and eventually appeared on the B-side of Cauldron.

== Gameplay ==
ZX Spectrum screenshot

The game is set in the cabin from the Evil Dead film. The player controls Ash, and must close cabin windows to prevent monsters from entering, while also killing monsters that are already in the cabin.

As the player defeats monsters with various weapons (shovels, shotguns, and axes), Ash's energy level decreases. Ash must continuously pick up new weapons in order to increase his energy. Once he has defeated all the monsters, Ash must obtain The Book of the Dead and destroy it in order to defeat the evil.

== Reception ==
=== Contemporary opinion and "computer nasties" controversy ===
Your Computer magazine's 1984 review noted then-contemporary concerns that gaming spin-offs of "video nasties" (such as The Evil Dead) might spawn similarly explicit "computer nasties". However, it considered that the game itself allayed any such fears, saying "you might have wondered if home computer graphics were capable of the sort of gory special effects video nasties trade in. The Evil Dead would confirm your doubts [..] there is nothing here to keep even the most unworldly 12-year-old awake at night".

Despite this, and the game's similarities to Atic Atac being noted, the review was generally positive, considering the graphics "excellent" and stating that there was "enough variety in it to keep the interest alive".

=== Retrospective ===
In a 2004 retrospective, Retro Gamer stated that while the game was simplistic by current standards, it was "fun to play (for about five minutes anyway)".
