= James Pond: Underwater Agent =

1990 video game

- Mega Drive cover art
- Developer: Vectordean
- Publishers: Millennium Interactive; Electronic Arts (GEN)
- Designer: Chris Sorrell
- Programmer: Chris Sorrell
- Artist: Chris Sorrell
- Composer: Richard Joseph
- Platforms: Amiga, Atari ST, Archimedes, Sega Genesis
- Release: Amiga, Atari ST: EU: 1990; Sega Genesis: NA: April 1991; EU: 1991
- Genre: Platform
- Mode: Single-player

James Pond: Underwater Agent is a 1990 platform video game developed by Vectordean and published by British company Millennium Interactive for the Amiga, Atari ST and Acorn Archimedes. A port to the Sega Genesis was released by Electronic Arts the following year. It was the first in the James Pond series of games.

== Gameplay ==
Amiga screenshot

James Pond has to solve puzzles to defeat the enemy and the gameplay revolves around finding objects to perform specific tasks, such as keys to rescue captured lobsters, or sponges to bung up the holes in leaking oil tankers. James must also fire bubbles at his enemies to trap them, before popping them to finish them off.

== Plot ==
A nefarious supervillain named "Doctor Maybe" (a play on Dr. No) has overtaken the ruthless megacorporation Acme Oil Company, and is not only filling the oceans with radiation and toxic waste but even threatening all the world from his underwater lair. The protagonist of the story and player character of the game is an intelligent, mutated anthropomorphic mudskipper who is given the name "James Pond" (after the legendary spy James Bond) and hired by the British Secret Service to protect the seas and take out the bad guys in underwater areas. He is also suave enough to seduce numerous attractive mermaids, some of whom act as double agents as is common with James Bond's love interests. The game spoofs James Bond movies with levels mimicking their titles, with level names like "License to Bubble" (after Licence to Kill), "A View to a Spill" (after A View to a Kill), "Leak and Let Die" (after Live and Let Die) and "From Three Mile Island with Love" (after From Russia with Love).

== Reception ==
Reception

Review scores
Publication	Score
Electronic Gaming Monthly	4,4,3,6 (SMD)
Mega Action	82% (SMD)
Videogames & Computer Entertainment	7/10 (SMD)
Console XS	70% (SMD)
MegaTech	77% (SMD)

James Pond received mixed but mostly positive reviews. VideoGames & Computer Entertainment gave the game seven out of ten, calling it "an entertaining and challenging undersea caper that should please just about anyone". Electronic Gaming Monthly gave it a four, four, three, and six, out of ten, calling it "not exciting or fun", but "a nice kids [sic] game". Mega Action gave James Pond a score of 82% writing: "James Pond does for fish as Sonic does for hedgehogs. It features some really cute baddies, making this game a real joy to play." Console XS gave a review score of 70%, they felt it was not a good conversion from the computer version and wrote that "Everything is far too bland and boring to excite Pond fans." MegaTech gave the Genesis version an overall score of 77% writing: "A cute and entertaining twelve-level aquatic platform game which provides plenty of fun."

== Legacy ==
James Pond was followed by two sequels: James Pond 2: Codename Robocod and James Pond 3: Operation Starfish. There was also a spin-off sports-themed game, entitled The Aquatic Games; James Pond was also featured as a cameo in Rolo to the Rescue. After Sony Computer Entertainment acquired Millennium Interactive, CyberLife retained the rights to the series and sold the property to Gameware Europe in 2003.

James Pond returned in James Pond in the Deathly Shallows for the iPhone and the iPad on 30 June 2011. In September 2013, Gameware Europe launched a Kickstarter for a new game in the series, James Pond: Pond is Back!, featuring the game's original designer, Chris Sorrell. The Kickstarter was canceled on October 7 as the funding target looked unlikely to be achieved.

In July 2025, a new game titled James Pond: Rogue AI was announced. Following the announcement, Sorrell criticized Gameware Europe for its use of generative AI in the game's marketing material while also expressing regret over his involvement in the previous Kickstarter campaign. Despite an estimated release window of "Q4 2025," the game was never released for unknown reasons. In August 2026, a collection of the previous games (minus James Pond in the Deathly Shallows) titled The James Pond Legacy: The Pond Is Not Enough was announced for the Nintendo Switch 2. The announcement was met with negative feedback, as the game's artwork appeared to use generative AI, despite comments from System 3 suggesting otherwise. Sorrell also criticized the artwork, writing to Time Extension, "I hope they choke on an AI-generated fishbone."
