= James Pond 2 =

1991 video game

James Pond 2: Codename: RoboCod
- Amiga box cover
- Developers: Vectordean; Intellectual Software Consultants Limited (PC)
- Publishers: Millennium Interactive; Electronic Arts (Genesis); U.S. Gold (Game Gear, Master System); Play It (PlayStation, PS2, Switch); Ocean Software (Game Boy, SNES); Valcon Games (GBA); Codemasters (DS)
- Designer: Chris Sorrell
- Programmer: Chris Sorrell
- Artist: Chris Sorrell
- Composer: Richard Joseph
- Platforms: Amiga, Amiga AGA, CD32, Atari ST, Genesis, Commodore 64, Archimedes, MS-DOS, Game Gear, Game Boy, Game Boy Advance, PlayStation, Master System, Super NES, Nintendo DS, PlayStation 2, Nintendo Switch
- Release: 1991: 1991 (Amiga, Atari ST, Genesis) 1992 (C64, Game Boy) 1993 (Amiga AGA, CD32, MS-DOS, SNES, Game Gear, Master System, Archimedes) 2003 (Game Boy Advance, PlayStation) 2005 (Nintendo DS) 2006 (PS2); EU: July 2, 2009 (PSN) 2019 (Nintendo Switch)
- Genre: Platform
- Mode: Single-player

James Pond 2: Codename: RoboCod, also known as Super James Pond on Super NES and Game Boy in North America and Super James Pond 2 in Europe, is a 1991 platform video game. It is the second installment in the James Pond series after James Pond: Underwater Agent and was developed by the same British teams as the original. The title music by Richard Joseph is a marimba-heavy rendition of the RoboCop film theme.

James Pond 2 was originally released on the Amiga, Atari ST and Sega Genesis in 1991 by three different publishers. It was ported to Amiga AGA, CD32, Game Gear, Commodore 64, Master System, MS-DOS, Acorn Archimedes, Game Boy, and Super NES. It was later redeveloped and released as a budget title for the Game Boy Advance, Nintendo DS, PlayStation, PlayStation 2, as a download on the PlayStation Portable and PlayStation 3 via the PlayStation Network store, and the Nintendo Switch.

== Gameplay ==
James Pond outside Santa's toy factory

James Pond starts outside Santa's toy factory. There are numerous doors, each of which leads to a stage with many differently-themed levels; there are 50 levels in total. Meanies lurk in these levels and come in many forms. There are no weapons in the game, so James Pond must jump on them to defeat them. After completing two "doors", James Pond moves on to another door where a guardian awaits.

James Pond's body armor enables him to extend his body vertically to incredible lengths and grab hold of the ceiling or platforms above him. This allows him to travel along with the ceiling and drop down on the top of an unsuspecting enemy, or to get to otherwise inaccessible areas. James Pond can also pick up items that provide points. Power-ups include extra lives and wings that grant James the ability to fly. From time to time, James Pond may enter vehicles, namely cars, planes, or flying bathtubs.

== Plot ==
The game takes place immediately after its predecessor. Although Acme Oil Company has been destroyed by James Pond, his arch enemy Dr. Maybe survived and has retreated to the North Pole where he has taken over Santa's workshop. Dr. Maybe is holding Santa's workers hostage (in most versions of the game they are penguins, in some, they are elves), and has turned many of Santa's helpers into his own twisted and dangerous assistants. James Pond is recruited to infiltrate Santa's grotto, free the captive penguins, retrieve the stolen toys for the children of the world, and defeat Dr. Maybe once and for all. This time, however, due to the greater risks involved in this mission, James Pond is given a robotic suit and the code name "RoboCod" (a play on RoboCop). This suit gives Pond superhuman strength and agility as well as enabling him to stretch his midsection almost indefinitely and reach otherwise impossibly high areas.

== Product placement ==
In the original UK version of the game, the penguins featured as in-game product placement for the McVitie's biscuit company's Penguin Biscuits. The 1991 EA release in the U.S. and Euro market featured the penguin in a Christmas scene in box art by illustrator Marc Ericksen.

== Ports ==
James Pond: Codename Robocod was released for the Game Boy Advance and PlayStation in 2003, the Nintendo DS in 2005, the PlayStation 2 in 2006, the PlayStation Network in 2009, and the Nintendo Switch in 2019. The handheld and PlayStation releases are identical except for the DS version, which features a map on the second screen. All these versions of the game are largely different from that of the original. The graphics have been improved to take advantage of the consoles' newer hardware, and while the levels retain some of the themes of the originals, their layout is entirely different. In the new versions, McVities' sponsorship branding has been removed from the game, and RoboCod must rescue Santa's elves, rather than penguins. In addition, the hidden levels have been omitted entirely. These recent iterations are remakes rather than ports of the original game.

== Reception ==
Reception

Review scores
Publication	Score
Electronic Gaming Monthly	7/10, 8/10, 8/10, 7/10 (GEN); 7/10, 6/10, 5/10, 4/10(Amiga CD32)
MegaTech	85%

UK magazine ACE gave the Amiga version a score of 934 out of 1000, calling it "polished, playable and (...) fun" and "completely excellent". Electronic Gaming Monthly gave the SNES version a 5 out of 10, commenting that "James's ability to make himself tall is quite interesting, but that is really the only special thing about him. Fans of JP may be better off with his Aquatic Games". In their review of the Amiga CD32 release, they praised the soundtrack while writing that the garishly colorful graphics tend to cause eye strain, the gameplay is mildly fun but unexciting, and that aside from the "extremely pixelated" full motion video intro, it is identical to the version on the less powerful Sega Genesis. Mega Action gave the Genesis version a score of 92% writing: "Better than the original and a massive playing to boot. This features all the ingredients that its predecessor offered, plus plenty more." Power Unlimited gave the SNES version a score of 75% commenting: "The only remarkable thing about Super James Pond is that it is a wacky parody of James Bond. Unfortunately, there is very little of this in the game. Furthermore, it is a usual, beautifully designed and musical platformer."

Mega placed the game at number 20 in their Top Mega Drive Games of All Time.
