= Daughter of Serpents =

1992 video game

- Developer(s): Eldritch Games
- Publisher(s): Millennium Interactive; Psygnosis (CD-ROM)
- Director(s): Richard Edwards; Chris Elliot
- Producer(s): Ian Saunter
- Designer(s): Richard Edwards; Chris Elliot
- Programmer(s): Keith Hook
- Artist(s): Pete Lyon
- Composer(s): Richard Joseph
- Platform(s): MS-DOS
- Release: 1992 (floppy disk); 1995 (CD-ROM)
- Genre(s): Adventure
- Mode(s): Single-player

Daughter of Serpents (retitled The Scroll on the CD version) is a point-and-click adventure game for MS-DOS developed by Eldritch Games and published in 1992 by Millennium Interactive. The game was released in the English, Italian, French, German and Spanish languages. It was planned to be ported to Amiga by December, but ultimately that was never released.

== Plot ==
The game's plot is inspired by the Cthulhu Mythos. In Ancient Egypt, dark worshippers contained some evil spells inside an ancient scroll to unleash monsters upon the world. In Alexandria in the 1920s, the scroll is given to the player by a strange lady.

== Gameplay ==
Before starting the game, the player can select one out six playable characters or customize one. A customized character can be either gender, with a profile inputted, one of two nationalities and a choice from six classes each with four or five skills. The character stats will determine what puzzles the player can solve in the game. The player's starting inventory consists of a diary, a map, some petty cash, a cookbook and a guidebook.

The CD version only allows two different playable characters to be chosen each with a different adventure in the game; Matthew Faulkner the Egyptologist and an Occultist. Unlike the Floppy version, the player must acquire the map, cookbook and guidebook rather than start with them.

== Development ==
Keith Hook programmed the game engine SIGNOS (Scripted Interactive Graphic Novel Operating System).

The lead artist Pete Lyon visited Egypt before he worked on the graphics to implement realism in the game. Richard Edwards ensured that all graphics were accurate to the time period of the game. The hotel scene was based on a photograph of Savoy from 1920.

== Reception ==
James Trunzo reviewed Daughter of Serpents in White Wolf #37 (July/Aug., 1993) and stated that "Daughter of Serpents is by no means a bad game; it contains a number of excellent features. Overall, though, it's too little of a good thing rather than too much. The self-proclaimed 'epic cinematic adventure' is more like an exciting chapter in a book that makes you want more - only to discover that you've reached the last page."
