= Stifflip & Co. =

1987 video game

- Developer: Binary Vision
- Publisher: Palace Software
- Designers: Paul Norris; Rupert Bowater
- Composer: Richard Joseph
- Platforms: ZX Spectrum, C64, Amstrad CPC
- Release: 1987
- Genre: Graphic adventure
- Mode: Single-player

Stifflip & Co. is a graphic adventure game published by Palace Software in 1987 for the ZX Spectrum, Commodore 64 and Amstrad CPC computers. The game is set in the early 20th century, between the two World Wars, and affectionately parodies the character and attitudes of the later British Empire.

== Plot ==
From the blurb on the game box:

Disaster looms for the bowler and brolly brigade. The contemptible COUNT CHAMELEON, Master of Disguise and sworn enemy of the establishment, is determined to succeed in his latest and greatest dastardly plot. His sale of rubber goods through mail-order ads in a civil service magazine, has led him to develop the RUBBERTRONIC RAY. With it he threatens to neutralise the starch in wind-collars, loosen stiff upper lips and generally relax moral standards - leading to the collapse of The Empire. Worse still, it will radically and unpredictably alter the bounce of a cricket ball. This bounder must be stopped!

== Gameplay ==
Gameplay is in the form of a graphic adventure with the player controlling four different characters: Viscount Sebastian Stifflip, Miss Palmyra Primbottom, Professor Braindeath and Colonel R. G. Bargie. The characters and their environment are presented in a comic strip format on-screen with the player controlling them via a mixture of icons and point-and-click options (albeit controlled by a keyboard and joystick rather than a mouse).

The four different characters all have different skills and so only certain characters can solve certain puzzles. For example, anything requiring scientific knowledge requires Professor Braindeath to deal with it.

== Reception ==
Reception

Award
Publication	Award
Crash	Smash
