= Palace Software =

British video game developer (1984–1991)

- Company type: Private
- Industry: Video games
- Founded: 1984
- Defunct: 1991
- Fate: Acquired by Titus France
- Headquarters: London, England
- Area served: Worldwide
- Products: Cauldron series Barbarian series
- Services: Video game publishing
- Parent: Palace Group

Palace Software was a British video game publisher and developer during the 1980s based in London, England. It was part of the Palace Group- a company associated with film and video distribution- and was itself notable for the Barbarian and Cauldron series of games for 8-bit home computer platforms, in particular the ZX Spectrum, Amstrad CPC and Commodore 64. Palace caused some controversy with its advertisements in computer magazines, particularly for Barbarian II: The Dungeon of Drax which featured Page Three girl Maria Whittaker as a scantily clad female warrior.

Palace's developers included artist Steve Brown and musician Richard Joseph.

In 1991, the Palace Group sold Palace Software to Titus France.

== Notable releases ==
- The Evil Dead (1984)
- Cauldron (video game) (1985)
- Cauldron II: The Pumpkin Strikes Back (1986)
- The Sacred Armour of Antiriad (1986)
- Barbarian: The Ultimate Warrior (1987)
- Stifflip & Co. (1987)
- Barbarian II: The Dungeon of Drax (1988)
- Dragon's Breath (1990)
- International 3D Tennis (1990)
