= Barbarian: The Ultimate Warrior =

1987 video game

- Commodore 64 box art featuring live-action models Maria Whittaker and Michael Van Wijk
- Developer: Palace Software
- Publishers: EU: Palace Software; NA: Epyx
- Designer: Steve Brown
- Programmer: Stanley Schembri
- Composer: Richard Joseph
- Platforms: Acorn Electron, Amiga, Amstrad CPC, Apple II, Atari ST, BBC Micro, Commodore 64, MS-DOS, Java ME, ZX Spectrum
- Release: 1987
- Genre: Fighting game
- Modes: Single-player, multiplayer

Barbarian: The Ultimate Warrior is a 1987 video game developed and published by Palace Software for the Amstrad CPC, Commodore 64, and ZX Spectrum. The game was ported to many other systems and was licensed to Epyx who published it as Death Sword in the United States.

Barbarian is a fighting game that gives players control over sword-wielding barbarians. In the game's two-player mode, players pit their characters against each other. Barbarian also has a single-player mode, in which the player's barbarian braves a series of challenges set by an evil wizard to rescue a princess.

Instead of using painted artwork for the game's box, Palace Software used photos of hired models. The photos, also used in advertising campaigns, featured Michael Van Wijk (who would later become famous as 'Wolf' in the TV series Gladiators) as the hero and bikini-clad Maria Whittaker, a model who was then associated with The Sun tabloid's Page 3 topless photo shoots. Palace Software's marketing strategy provoked controversy in the United Kingdom, with protests focused on the sexual aspects of the packaging rather than decapitations and other violence within the game. The ensuing controversy boosted Barbarian's profile, helping to make it a commercial success. Game critics were impressed with its fast and furious combat, and dashes of humour. The game was Palace Software's critical hit; boosted by Barbarian's success, Palace Software expanded its operations and started publishing other developers' work. In 1988, the company released a sequel, Barbarian II: The Dungeon of Drax.

== Gameplay ==
Barbarian features gory combat for the sake of rescuing a bikini-wearing princess. The titular barbarian (centre) decapitates his opponent in the single-player story mode. Player scores are tracked in the banner at the top of the screen.

Barbarian: The Ultimate Warrior is a fighting game that supports one or two players. Players assume the roles of sword-wielding barbarians, who battle in locales such as a forest glade and a "fighting pit". The game's head-to-head mode lets a player fight against another or the computer in time-limited matches. The game also features a single-player story mode, which comprises a series of plot-connected challenges.

Using joysticks or the keyboard, players move their characters around the arena, jumping to dodge low blows and rolling to dodge or trip the opponent. By holding down the fire button and moving the controller, players direct the barbarians to kick, headbutt, or attack with their swords. Each barbarian has 12 life points, which are represented as 6 circles in the top corners of the interface. A successful attack on a barbarian takes away one of his life points (half a circle). The character dies when his life points are reduced to zero. Alternatively, a well-timed blow to the neck decapitates the barbarian, killing him instantly, upon which a goblin enters the arena, kicks the head, and drags the body away.

If the players do not input any commands for a time, the game attempts a self-referencing action to draw their attentions: the barbarians turn to face the players, shrug their shoulders, and say "C'mon". The game awards points for successful attacks; the more complex the move, the higher the score awarded. A score board displays the highest points achieved for the game.

=== Single-player story mode ===
In the single-player story mode, the player controls a nameless barbarian who is on a quest to defeat the evil wizard Drax. Princess Mariana has been kidnapped by Drax, who is protected by 8 barbarian warriors. The protagonist engages each of the other barbarians in a fight to the death. Overcoming them, he faces the wizard. After the barbarian has killed Drax, Mariana drops herself at her saviour's feet and the screen fades to black. The United States version of the game names the protagonist Gorth.

== Development ==
In 1985, Palace Software hired Steve Brown as a game designer and artist. He thought up the concept of pitting a broom-flying witch against a monster pumpkin, and created Cauldron and Cauldron II: The Pumpkin Strikes Back. The two games were commercial successes and Brown was given free rein for his third work. He was inspired by Frank Frazetta's fantasy paintings to create a sword fighting game that was "brutal and as realistic as possible".

Brown based the game and its characters on the Conan the Barbarian series, having read all of Robert E. Howard's stories of the eponymous warrior. He conceptualised 16 moves and practised them with wooden swords, filming his sessions as references for the game's animation. One move, the Web of Death, was copied from the 1984 sword and sorcery film Conan the Destroyer. Spinning the sword like a propeller, Brown "nearly took [his] eye out" when he practised the move. Playing back the videos, the team traced each frame of action onto clear plastic sheets laid over the television screen. The tracings were transferred on a grid that helped the team map the swordplay images, pixel by pixel, to a digital form. Brown refused to follow the convention of using small sprites to represent the fighters in the game, forcing the coders to conceive a method to animate larger blocks of graphics: Palace Software's co-founder Richard Leinfellner said they "multiplexed the sprites and had different look-up tables for different frames."

Feeling that most of the artwork on game boxes at that time were "pretty poor", Brown suggested that an "iconic fantasy imagery with real people would be a great hook for the publicity campaign." His superiors agreed and arranged a photo shoot, hiring models Michael Van Wijk and Maria Whittaker to pose as the barbarian and princess. Whittaker was a topless model, who frequently appeared on Page 3 of the tabloid, The Sun. She wore a tiny bikini for the shoot while Van Wijk, wearing only a loincloth, posed with a sword. Palace Software also packaged a poster of Whittaker in costume with the game. Just before release, the company discovered that fellow developer Psygnosis was producing a game also titled Barbarian, albeit of the platform genre. After several discussions, Palace Software appended the subtitle "The Ultimate Warrior" to differentiate the two products.

The sounds of the characters are taken from the 1985 film Red Sonja. Most notably the "EEY-ECH!" sound that plays when the player attempts to decapitate an opponent. This particular sound can be found near the beginning of the movie when Arnold's character is ambushed after pulling an arrow out of the lady's back.

=== Releases ===
Barbarian was released in 1987 initially for the Amstrad CPC, Commodore 64 and ZX Spectrum and was subsequently ported to most other home computers. These machines were varied in their capabilities, and the software ported to them was modified accordingly. The version for the 8-bit ZX Spectrums is mostly monochromatic, displaying the outlines of the barbarians against single-colour backgrounds. The sounds are recorded at a lower sampling rate. Conversely, the version for the Atari ST, which has 16- and 32-bit buses, presents a greater variety of backgrounds and slightly higher quality graphics than the original version. Its story mode also pits 10 barbarians against the player instead of the usual 8. Digitised sound samples are used in the Atari ST and 32-bit Amiga versions; the latter also features digitised speech. Each fight begins with the announcement of "Prepare to die!", and metallic sounding thuds and clangs ring out as swords clash against each other.

After the initial releases, Barbarian was re-released several times; budget label Kixx published these versions without Whittaker on the covers. Across the Atlantic, video game publisher Epyx acquired the license to Barbarian and released it under the title Death Sword as part of their "Maxx Out!" video game series.

== Reception and legacy ==
Barbarian's advertisements triggered some outcries of moral indignation. Electron User reported that another magazine had refused to publish Superior Software's advert for its licensed BBC Micro and Acorn Electron ports unless parts of the image were covered up. Electron User, who published the uncensored advertisement, received letters from readers and religious bodies, who called the image "offensive and particularly insulting to women" and an "ugly pornographic advertisement". Richard Hanson, Superior's managing director commented that the Advertising Standards Authority had confirmed that the image was not in bad taste, and that the publicity was likely to send the game to the top of the charts.

Chris Jager, a writer for PC World, considered the cover "a trashy controversy-magnet featuring a glamour-saucepot" and a "big bloke [in leotard]".

Video game industry observers Russell DeMaria and Johnny Wilson commented that the United Kingdom public were more concerned over the scantily-clad Whittaker than the gory contents in the game.

In 1988, Advanced Computer Entertainment magazine submitted videos of the gameplay to the British Board of Film Classification who stated that the decapitations were merely "storybook violence" and that the game would have probably have received a PG certificate had it been submitted to them. David Houghton, writer for GamesRadar, claimed the game would be rated "Mature" by the Entertainment Software Rating Board if it was published in 2009.

Conversely, Barbarian was banned in Germany by the Bundesprüfstelle für jugendgefährdende Medien for its violent content. The ban forbade promotion of the game and its sale to customers under the age of 18. A censored version of the game, which changed the colour of the blood to green, was later permitted to be freely sold in the country.

Reviewers were impressed with Barbarian's gory gameplay. Zzap!64's Steve Jarratt appreciated the "fast and furious" action and his colleague Ciaran Brennan said Barbarian should have been the licensed video game to the fantasy action film Highlander (which had a lot of sword fights and decapitations) instead. Amiga Computing's Brian Chappell enjoyed "hacking the foe to bits, especially when a well aimed blow decapitates him." Several other reviewers express the same satisfaction in chopping the heads off their foes. Although shocked at the game's violence, Antic's reviewer said the "sword fight game is the best available on the ST." According to Jarratt, Barbarian represented "new heights in bloodsports". Equally pleasing to the reviewers at Zzap!64 and Amiga User International's Tony Horgan was the simplicity of the game; they observed that almost anyone could quickly familiarise themselves with the game mechanics, making the two-player mode a fun and quick pastime.

Although the barbarian characters use the same basic blocky sprites, they impressed reviewers at Zzap!64 and Amiga Computing with their smooth animation and lifelike movements. Reviewers of the Amiga version, however, expressed disappointment with the port for failing to exploit the computer's greater graphics capability and implement more detailed character sprites. Its digitised sounds, however, won praise from Commodore User's Gary Penn. Advanced Computer Entertainment's reviewers had similar thoughts over the Atari ST port.

Reviewing for Computer and Video Games, Paul Boughton was impressed by the game's detailed gory effects, such as the aftermath of a decapitation, calling them "hypnotically gruesome". It was these little touches that "[makes] the game worthwhile", according to Richard Eddy in Crash. Watching "the head [fall] to the ground [as blood spurts from the] severed neck, accompanied by a scream and satisfying thud as the torso tumbles" proved to be "wholesome stuff" for Chappell, and the scene was a "great retro gaming moment" for Retro Gamer's staff. The cackling goblin, which drags off the bodies, endeared him to some reviewers; the team at Retro Gamer regretted that the creature did not have his own game. The actions of the barbarian also impressed them to nominate him as one of their top 50 characters from the early three decades of video gaming.

Popular Computing Weekly considered the Amstrad version to be the best, calling the Commodore 64's animation "shaky". Your Sinclair, awarding the game 7/10, complained it was too similar to previous games like The Way of the Exploding Fist and Ninja.

According to Leinfellner, the controversy did not negatively affect Barbarian, but boosted the game's sales and profile tremendously. The game proved to be a big hit, reaching the top of the all-format charts in 1987 and number one in the Acorn Electron chart in 1988. Leinfellner said he received royalty cheques for approximately seven years, the first of which was for £20,000. Barbarian II: The Dungeon of Drax was released in 1988, and Barbarian III was in the works. Van Wijk and Whittaker were hired again to grace the box cover and advertisements. After the success with Barbarian, Palace Software began to expand its portfolio by publishing games that were created by other developers. Barbarian, however, remained its most popular game, best remembered for its violent sword fights and Maria Whittaker.

In 2011, Anuman Interactive (French publisher) launched a remake of the game, adapted to mobile devices and computers: Barbarian – The Death Sword.

A spiritual successor, Age of Barbarian, was released in 2012 by Italian indie game developer Crian Soft, with a much longer and updated Extended Cut released in 2016.
