= Rimrunner =

1988 video game

- Cover art
- Developer(s): Palace Software
- Publisher(s): Palace Software
- Designer(s): Steve Brown
- Programmer(s): Binary Vision
- Artist(s): Gary Carr
- Composer(s): Richard Joseph
- Platform(s): Commodore 64
- Release: 1988
- Genre(s): Scrolling shooter
- Mode(s): Single-player

Rimrunner is a horizontally scrolling shooter designed by Steve Brown for the Commodore 64 and published by Palace Software in 1988. Versions for the Atari ST, Amstrad CPC, Amiga, and ZX Spectrum, were cancelled.

== Plot ==
An alien race of arachnoids are invading various planets around the galaxy. The only protection the planets have are planetary forcefields, which require frequent recharging. A team of elite insectoid warriors mounted on runner creatures are assigned to do the job of maintaining the forcefields before penetration occurs.

== Gameplay ==
The main objective is to traverse across the planet to find the forcefield generators to recharge them. Throughout the game, the player will have numerous hostile forces to shoot down in multiple directions. The player can either control the insectoid character on foot or on its mount. Being on a mount allows faster travel around the planet, although the mount can take limited hits from enemies, before it dies, though a spare one can be summoned. The player has limited time to recharge the generators, has a limited number of spare mounts, and has limited energy, which depletes when an enemy or projectile hits the insectoid. A radar on the top menu indicates which generators need to be maintained. When a generator is found, the player must dismount and use a special tool to power it up. When all generators are maintained, the player proceeds to the next level. If the player runs out of time or energy, the game is over.
