= Cauldron (video game) =

1985 video game

- Box art by Steve Brown depicting the main protagonist, a witch
- Developer: Palace Software
- Publisher: Palace Software
- Designer: Steve Brown
- Programmers: Richard Leinfellner; Stanley Schembri
- Composer: Keith Miller
- Platforms: Amstrad CPC, Commodore 64, ZX Spectrum
- Release: 1985
- Genres: Platform, scrolling shooter
- Mode: Single-player

Cauldron is a video game developed and published by British developer Palace Software in 1985 for the ZX Spectrum, Commodore 64, and Amstrad CPC home computers. It contains both platform game and horizontally scrolling shooter sections. Players control a witch who aims to become the "Witch Queen" by defeating an enemy called the "Pumpking".

Designed by Steve Brown and Richard Leinfellner, Cauldron originated as a licensed game of the horror film Halloween. Brown eventually altered the game to use a theme based on the Halloween holiday. The mix of two genres resulted from Brown and Leinfellner wanting to make a shoot 'em up and platform game, respectively. The developers realised that there were no technical limitations preventing the genres from being combined.

The game received praise from video game magazines, who focused on the graphics and two different modes of play. A common complaint was Cauldron's excessive difficulty. The following year, Palace released a direct sequel titled Cauldron II: The Pumpkin Strikes Back.

== Gameplay ==
The witch (top left) flies along the landscape and shoots enemies. Game statistics (points obtained, magic points, and remaining lives) are tracked at the top. The ZX Spectrum version is pictured.

Cauldron is divided into two modes of play: shooting while flying and jumping along platforms. The player navigates the witch protagonist through a 2D game world from a side-view perspective. Areas set on the surface feature the witch flying on a broomstick whereas underground segments require her to run and jump in caverns. The game begins in the witch's cottage, where she keeps six parchments that can combine into a spell. The objective is to collect six ingredients—each one corresponds to a parchment—and return them to the cottage in order to complete the spell necessary to defeat the antagonist, the Pumpking.

The game world includes forest, mountains, and ocean terrains. While traversing the world, the witch encounters Halloween-themed enemies, such as pumpkins, ghosts, skulls, and bats, as well as creatures, such as sharks and seagulls. In the flying segments, the player must search for randomly scattered coloured keys to access underground areas that contain the six ingredients. While flying, the witch moves with inertia when changing direction, similar to the 1981 arcade shooting game Defender.

A collision with an enemy causes the witch's magic meter—which is also used to fire offensive projectiles at enemies—to decrease. The character dies once the meter is depleted. After dying, the character reappears on the screen and the meter is refilled. The game provides limited opportunities for this to occur and ends once the number of lives reaches zero.

== Development ==
Following The Evil Dead's release in 1984, Palace Software hired Steve Brown to design games and produce art as well as Stan Schembri to assist Richard Leinfellner with programming. Cauldron began development as a game based on the 1978 slasher film Halloween. Palace co-founder Pete Stone viewed video games as an extension of films and wanted to follow The Evil Dead with another horror movie adaptation.

"I worked on concepts and designs, but a tiny eight-pixel high Michael Myers trundling around the screen with a knife just didn't make much of a game. However, the pumpkins I'd drawn looked really cool and gave me the idea to take the game in a completely different direction."

— Steve Brown on changing the direction of the project

After the company obtained Halloween's video game rights, Brown was assigned the project. Unable to develop a concept he was happy with, Brown took the game in a new direction. Inspired by the Halloween holiday, he envisioned a game featuring witches and pumpkins. Stuart Hunt of Retro Gamer, however, attributed the switch to Mary Whitehouse's campaign against violent horror films in the 1980s. Brown submitted concept drawings to Stone, who approved further development. Influenced by what he deemed a "classical witch", Brown designed the witch with a long nose and a broomstick. He created a Plasticine model of the character as a reference for a painting that was used for the game's box art.

Brown was joined by Leinfellner, who served as the lead programmer. The two enjoyed different video game genres—Brown liked platform games, while Leinfellner preferred shoot 'em ups—and decided to create a game engine that could handle both methods of playing. Leinfellner's early versions of the game had the witch only flying around the screen. After seeing this, Brown asked Leinfellner why games were either "scrolling or platform", which Leinfellner replied that there was no technical reason that prevented their combination. In order to make the witch land on the ground frequently, the team added locations for the character to replenish her magic points. Additionally, they implemented a magic meter as a finite supply of magic to increase the player's need to traverse on foot. Both developers play tested the game but only played the segments individually rather than in a sequence. In retrospect, Brown attributes the game's excess difficulty to this along with the fact that the two played with unlimited game lives.

== Release ==
Palace released the game on three home computers: Amstrad CPC, Commodore 64, and ZX Spectrum. The Spectrum and Amstrad versions lack scrolling graphics in the shoot 'em up levels and use flick-screening to approximate it. A port of The Evil Dead, originally programmed by Leinfellner for the Commodore 64, was included on the second side of the Spectrum cassette. Palace included The Evil Dead to distribute the game to a wider audience; it originally had a limited release at the time due to retailers fearing parental backlash.

The next year, Cauldron was included in home computer compilations; Now Games 2 at the beginning of 1986, and 10 Computer Hits 3 during the year's holiday season. It was later re-released along with its sequel, Cauldron II: The Pumpkin Strikes Back, as a compilation title on Amstrad CPC and ZX Spectrum computers in the 1990s. Decades later, Cauldron was made available on the Antstream Arcade gaming platform. The Commodore 64 version was released first in December 2020; the other two home computer formats followed later.

== Reception ==
Reception

Review scores
Publication	Score
Crash	91%
Retro Gamer	92%
Sinclair User	5/5
Zzap!64	87%
ZX Computing	4/5

Award
Publication	Award
Crash	Crash Smash (July 1985)

Cauldron was well-received by the video game press, who focused on the graphical quality and game design. Tony Takoushi of Computer and Video Games described the game as a "quality arcade-adventure" and called the graphics stunning. Reviewers from Crash magazine praised the animation and detail of the graphics, as well as the gameplay. Three of Zzap!64's reviewers—Julian Rignall, Bob Wade, and Gary Penn—echoed similar statements about the graphics. The group complimented the gameplay, specifically the adventure aspects, and considered the large game world a positive component. A Computer Gamer reviewer praised the flying portions of the game, calling the gameplay enjoyable. While he praised the platforming portions, the reviewer commented that design flaws made the game more difficult than it should have been. Clare Edgeley of Sinclair User praised the graphical quality of the ZX Spectrum version but commented that the colours occasionally overlap and the screen flickers. ZX Computing's reviewer praised the ZX Spectrum conversion, calling it superior to the Commodore 64 release. The reviewer lauded the graphics and gameplay of the flying segments but bemoaned the platforming aspect, describing it as a Jet Set Willy clone.

Publications dedicated to the ZX Spectrum platform considered the inclusion of The Evil Dead with the ZX Spectrum release a positive aspect that added value to the overall package. The game's difficulty was a common complaint. Computer Gamer, Crash, and ZX Computing commented that playing the game with limited lives was very challenging. Retro Gamer's Craig Grannell described the game as "unforgiving", citing difficulty landing and excessive precision required in the flying and platforming segments respectively. In the magazine's retrospective profile of Palace Software, Retro Gamer staff again noted Cauldron's high difficulty and commented that the Commodore 64 release was the best version of the game. They complimented the game's colourful visuals as well as the effective mix of arcade action and adventure.

== Legacy ==
Following the success of Cauldron, Palace released a direct sequel, Cauldron II: The Pumpkin Strikes Back, in 1986. The game is set after the events of the first game and features a bouncing pumpkin that survived the witch's ascension to power. Players navigate the pumpkin around a castle in search of the Witch Queen to enact revenge. The commercial success of the two Cauldron games prompted Palace to give Brown more creative freedom for his next project, Barbarian: The Ultimate Warrior. After Palace Group sold Palace Software to Titus Software in 1991, Titus released Super Cauldron in 1992 on MS-DOS personal computers. It was later released in 1993 on Amiga, Atari ST, and Amstrad CPC.

== See also ==
- The Guardian Legend – 1988 video game that combines action-adventure and shoot 'em up gameplay
