= International 3D Tennis =

1990 video game

- Developer: Sensible Software
- Publisher: Palace Software
- Composer: Richard Joseph
- Platforms: Amiga, Atari ST, Amstrad CPC, Commodore 64, ZX Spectrum
- Release: 1990
- Genre: Sports
- Modes: Single-player, multiplayer

International 3D Tennis is a 1990 tennis video game developed by Sensible Software and published by Palace Software for the Amiga, Atari ST, Amstrad CPC, Commodore 64, and ZX Spectrum.

== Gameplay ==
The game has three modes: single match, tournament, and season. Tournament mode lets the player pick from 72 different tournaments. Season mode is a series of tournaments during a single year. The game features polygon graphics and ten camera angles. The game offers four difficulty levels where the controls get more complicated and the AI gets better in higher difficulties.

== Reception ==
Reception

Review scores
| Publication | Score |
|---|---|
| Amiga Format | 79% (1990); 83% (1992) |
| Amiga Power | 3/6 (1991); 74% (1992) |
| Computer and Video Games | 94% (C64) |
| ST Format | 88% (ST) |
| The Games Machine (UK) | 92% (C64); 87% (Amiga) |
| Your Sinclair | 75% (1990); 81% (1992) |
| Amstar | 13/20 (CPC) |

Amiga Format said that Pro Tennis Tour is the better game: "International 3D Tennis is good, but the graphics let it down and, although it plays well, it does not play as well as Ubi Soft’s game." Computer and Video Games concluded: "[...] once mastered, International 3D Tennis offers the best tennis action you're ever likely to experience off court." The Games Machine summarized: "Combining the innovative 3-D with the variety of shots at hand and the sheer playability, International 3-D Tennis is one of the best computer sports games ever, appealing to many more than just tennis players." Your Sinclair summed up: "Nice 3D gameplay, shame about the sluggish speed."
