= Rome: Pathway to Power =

1992 video game

- European cover art
- Developer: Firstlight
- Publishers: EU: Millennium Interactive; NA: Maxis
- Composer: Richard Joseph
- Platforms: Amiga, MS-DOS
- Release: EU: 1992; NA: 1993
- Genres: Strategy, adventure
- Mode: Single-player

Rome: Pathway to Power (released as Rome: A.D. 92 in Europe) is an adventure video game with strategy elements for Amiga and MS-DOS home computers. It was published in Europe by Millennium Interactive in 1992 and in the United States by Maxis in 1993. Set in ancient Rome, the objective of the game is to advance a character from a Roman slave through the ranks of Roman society and eventually become Caesar.

Rome: Pathway to Power uses an isometric interface and was based on an engine developed by Steve Grand in 1979 called Microcosm. Microcosm was the base of several educational adventures for children before Rome. Another game by Grand using the same engine is 1991's The Adventures of Robin Hood.

The game is divided into six chapters:

1. Herculaneum: You have to advance from slave to citizen and escape the eruption of Mount Vesuvius.
2. Rome 1: You have to warn the emperor about a planned assassination.
3. Britain: You have to fight the Britons.
4. Rome 2: You have to be elected to the Roman Senate.
5. Egypt: You have to protect Cleopatra.
6. Rome 3: You have to become emperor.

== Reception ==
The One gave the Amiga version of Rome: A.D. 92 an overall score of 80%, stating "[Rome: A.D. 92 is a] huge game with plenty to do and action a-plenty. The way the plot develops is good and the overall storyline is well written and neat ... Cleverly, the way that the game is split into stages, each with their own map area, means that although there's lots to see and do, the game's size never becomes frustrating or overwhelming." The review criticized the graphics, however, expressing that how the backdrops are presented and the isometric viewpoint "gives the impression of playing in a shoe-box", and furthermore calling the sprites "too small" and visuals "eye-straining".
