= The Aquatic Games =

1992 video game

The Aquatic Games Starring James Pond and the Aquabats
- European Mega Drive cover art
- Developer: Vectordean
- Publishers: Millennium Interactive; Electronic Arts (Mega Drive); Seika Corp. (SNES)
- Producer: Kevin Shrapnell
- Designer: Steve Bak
- Programmer: Steve Bak
- Artist: Sean Nicholls
- Composer: Richard Joseph
- Platforms: Amiga, Sega Genesis, Super NES
- Release: NA: 1992; EU: October 15, 1992
- Genre: Platform game
- Modes: Single-player, multiplayer

Reception

Review score
| Publication | Score |
|---|---|
| GameZone | 83/100 (Mega Drive) |

The Aquatic Games Starring James Pond and the Aquabats, also known as The Super Aquatic Games Starring the Aquabats on the Super NES, is a 1992 sports video game developed by Vectordean and published by Millennium Interactive. It featured pseudo-Olympic sports starring the video game character James Pond, better known for his series of side-scrolling platform games. It was the last game to be released for the Amiga A500. Though the next game (James Pond 3: Operation Starfish) also appeared on the Amiga, it was only compatible with the newer range of 32-bit Amigas (such as the A1200) which used the AGA chipset.

== Gameplay ==
In-game screenshot (Amiga)

The Aquatic Games Starring James Pond and the Aquabats is an arcade sports game. The game is an aquatic-themed parody of games like Konami's Track & Field.

The game contains classical music pieces Ode to Joy (from Beethoven's 9th) in the title screen and Schubert's fish song "Die Forelle" during certain events. The rest of the music is composed by Richard Joseph.

== Reception ==
GamePro gave the SNES version a generally positive review. They commented that the simplistic gameplay, cartoony graphics, and humorous sound effects make it a game that younger players would enjoy, while older players would find it unappealing.

In contrast, Classic Game Room's Mark Bussler reviewed it negatively as "a very half-baked game at best". He made an exception to the Feeding Time mini-game, "which would have made a good Atari 2600 game back in the day".
