= Michael Van Wijk =

English bodybuilder

- Born: 30 September 1952 (age 73); Bombay, India (now Mumbai, India)
- Spouse: Paula Van Wijk
- Children: 4

Michael Van Wijk (born 30 September 1952) is an English bodybuilder, professional sportsperson, actor and TV presenter. He is most well known for his role as Wolf on British TV endurance sports game show Gladiators, a role he held for all its eight series (1992–2000).

== Career ==
Van Wijk used to run a gym in Hayes in Bromley, London originally called Matrix and later 'Wolf's Fitness Centre'. It was open until the late 1990s and included facilities geared towards bodybuilders, boxers and general fitness.

In 1987, Michael Van Wijk was chosen to be the cover star of Palace Software's computer game Barbarian: The Ultimate Warrior.

In October 1994, he played one match for the reserve team of Gillingham F.C., playing for 73 minutes in a match against Cambridge United's reserves before going off injured. The match attracted a crowd ten times the average for the club's reserve team games.

After Gladiators ended Van Wijk moved to New Zealand and opened a chain of gyms.

After being missing from British television screens for nine years, Van Wijk told Loaded magazine in April 2008, "I want to come back, I want to be a Gladiator again." Loaded sent a journalist from London to Wolf's home in Henderson, Auckland, to persuade the actor to return to England to appear in the new series. According to the Loaded article, he was a regular on the Kiwi Cage Fighting scene, and used to compete nationally in Brazilian Jiu Jitsu championships. He is a twice silver medallist competing against fighters half of his age for the New Zealand title.

In 2008, he appeared on the Gladiators Legends Special, which he took part in alongside Ace, Hunter and Trojan.

In 2023, Van Wijk competed on Squid Game: The Challenge as Player 172. He was eliminated in Red Light, Green Light.

== Filmography ==
- Salome's Last Dance (1988)
- The Bruce (1996)
