= Richard Joseph =

British composer, musician and sound specialist (1953–2007)

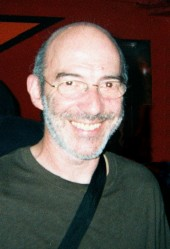

Background information
- Born: 23 April 1953; United Kingdom
- Died: 4 March 2007 (aged 53)
- Genres: Video game music
- Occupations: Computer game composer, musician and sound specialist
- Years active: 1986–2006
- Website: richardjose.ph (archived)

Richard Joseph (23 April 1953 – 4 March 2007) was an English computer game composer, musician and sound specialist. He had a career spanning 20 years starting in the early days of gaming on the C64 and the Amiga and onto succeeding formats. He is best known for games like Barbarian: The Ultimate Warrior, Sensible Soccer, The Chaos Engine, and Cannon Fodder.

== Biography ==
Prior to working in games Richard Joseph had a fleeting career in the music industry working with artists such as Trevor Horn and Hugh Padgham. He released one solo single on EMI and was part of the group CMU which released two albums (although Joseph was only involved with the second, Space Cabaret) on Transatlantic before evolving into jazz funk band Shakatak.

Joseph was noted in game audio for bringing "real" voice actors into a game (Mega Lo Mania), the use of interactive music (Chaos Engine), working with established recording artists (Betty Boo on Magic Pockets, Captain Sensible on Sensible Soccer, Brian May on Rise of the Robots and John Foxx on Gods and Speedball 2), and featuring vocals in title tunes.

In the late 1980s and early 1990s, he produced soundtracks for development teams Sensible Software and the Bitmap Brothers. He is also credited with the soundtrack to the C64 version of the hit Defender of the Crown.

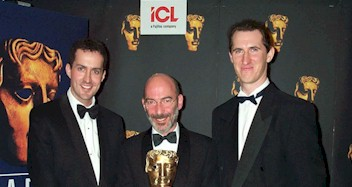
James Hannigan, Joseph and Nick Laviers at the BAFTA Interactive Awards 2000

He then went on to set up Audio Interactive at Pinewood Studios and, along with composer James Hannigan, helped Electronic Arts to win the BAFTA Award for best audio in 2000 for Theme Park World. From 1990 onwards Joseph was a frequent musical collaborator with Jon Hare with whom he co-wrote and arranged all of Sensible Software's best known musical tracks including the soundtrack for Cannon Fodder the GBC version of which was also nominated for a BAFTA in 2000, and is still the only small-format soundtrack to be recognised by BAFTA to this day. In 1995 Hare and Joseph embarked upon an epic 32 track soundtrack for the multimedia product Sex 'n' Drugs 'n' Rock 'n' Roll, signed to Warner Interactive, however in 1998 Warner bowed out of the games market and their Magnum Opus was only ever released as a limited edition audio CD.

After working as Audio Director on Republic: The Revolution and Evil Genius for Elixir Studios (music composed by James Hannigan), both winning BAFTA nominations for Hannigan's scores, Joseph moved to France where he ran SoundTropez, a company offering next-technology soundtracks.

Joseph came from an entertainment family. Brother Eddy is a BAFTA-winning sound supervisor, working on films such as Harry Potter and James Bond. Brother Pat is a director of The Mill which won an Oscar for Gladiator. Nephew Alex is a foley supervisor. His father Teddy (1918–2006) was a production executive working on, amongst many others, films by John Schlesinger and Alfred Hitchcock.

After being diagnosed with lung cancer, he died on 4 March 2007 aged 53 years. Wacky Races: Mad Motors is dedicated to him.

== Works ==
- 3 Ninjas Kick Back (1994)
- Action Man: Jungle Storm (2000)
- Action Man: Raid on Island X (1999)
- Apache (1995)
- Ball Breakers (2000)
- Barbarian: The Ultimate Warrior (1987)
- Barbarian II: The Dungeon of Drax (1988)
- Brutal Sports Football (1993)
- Cadaver (1990)
- Cannon Fodder (1993)
- Cannon Fodder 2 (1994)
- Cauldron II: The Pumpkin Strikes Back (1986)
- Colony Wars: Red Sun (2000)
- Creatures 2 (1998)
- Cyber Empires (1992)
- Daughter of Serpents (1992)
- Demoniak (1991)
- Diggers (1993)
- Diggers 2: Extractors (1995)
- Evil Genius (2004)
- Flight of the Amazon Queen (1995)
- Global Effect (1992)
- Glover (1998)
- Gods (1991)
- International 3D Tennis (1990)
- James Pond (1990)
- James Pond 2 (1991)
- James Pond 3 (1993)
- Knightmare (1991)
- Lego Loco (1998)
- Lego Stunt Rally (2000)
- Lure of the Temptress (1992)
- Magic Pockets (1991)
- Mega Lo Mania (1991)
- Moonshine Racers (1991)
- Moonstone: A Hard Days Knight (1991)
- Mr Blobby (1994)
- Myth: History in the Making (1992)
- NBA ShootOut '97 (1997)
- Putty (1992)
- Putty Squad (1994)
- Republic: The Revolution (2003)
- Rimrunner (1988)
- Rise of the Robots (1994)
- Rome: Pathway to Power (1992)
- Sensible Golf (1994)
- Sensible Soccer '98 (1998)
- Sensible Soccer 2006 (2006)
- Sensible Soccer: European Champions (1992)
- Sensible World of Soccer (1994)
- Shoot-'Em-Up Construction Kit (1987)
- Silverload (1995)
- Speedball 2: Brutal Deluxe (1990)
- Stifflip & Co. (1987)
- Stormball (1991)
- Street Racer (1997)
- Super Troll Islands (1994)
- The Adventures of Robin Hood (1991)
- The Aquatic Games (1992)
- The Chaos Engine (1993)
- The Chaos Engine 2 (1996)
- The Elder Scrolls IV: Oblivion (2006)
- The Sacred Armour of Antiriad (1986)
- Theme Park Inc (2001)
- Theme Park World (1999)
- Time Trax (1994)
- Voodoo Nightmare (1990)
- Wicked (1989)
- Wizkid (1992)
- Worlds of Legend: Son of the Empire (1993)
