= Simulmondo =

Italian video game developer (1987–1999)

Simulmondo S.r.l.
- Industry: Video games
- Founded: 1988
- Founder: Francesco Carlà
- Headquarters: Bologna, Italy
- Key people: Francesco Carlà (Founder and CEO), Ivan Venturi (Programmer), Riccardo Cangini (Graphic and Designer)
- Number of employees: 20
- Website: www.simul.it

Simulmondo was an Italian software house from Bologna. Specialized video game developer and publisher, it has produced about 150 video games for Commodore 64, Amiga, PC and Atari ST.

Initially founded in 1988 by Francesco Carlà and Riccardo Arioti, via an agreement with publisher Ital Video, Simulmondo was among Italy's most important game developers in the late 1980s and early 1990s, mainly developing titles for home computers.

Simulmondo released games mainly for the Amiga, MS-DOS and the Commodore 64 platform. The latest Simulmondo game, the middle 90s, had been released for the Windows 95 platform. For the distribution of the games, Simulmondo used an innovative strategy for the time: Simulmondo branched out into an early form of episodic gaming, by publishing short adventures that could be completed in one or two hours and distributed them on newsstands at a price much lower than that of the complete games sold in a normal shop.

By 1993, the company had lost many of its original programmers and artists, like Ivan Venturi. By the following year, Simulmondo had all but disappeared from the mainstream video games market.
