= Dragon's Breath (dessert) =

Cereal frozen in liquid nitrogen

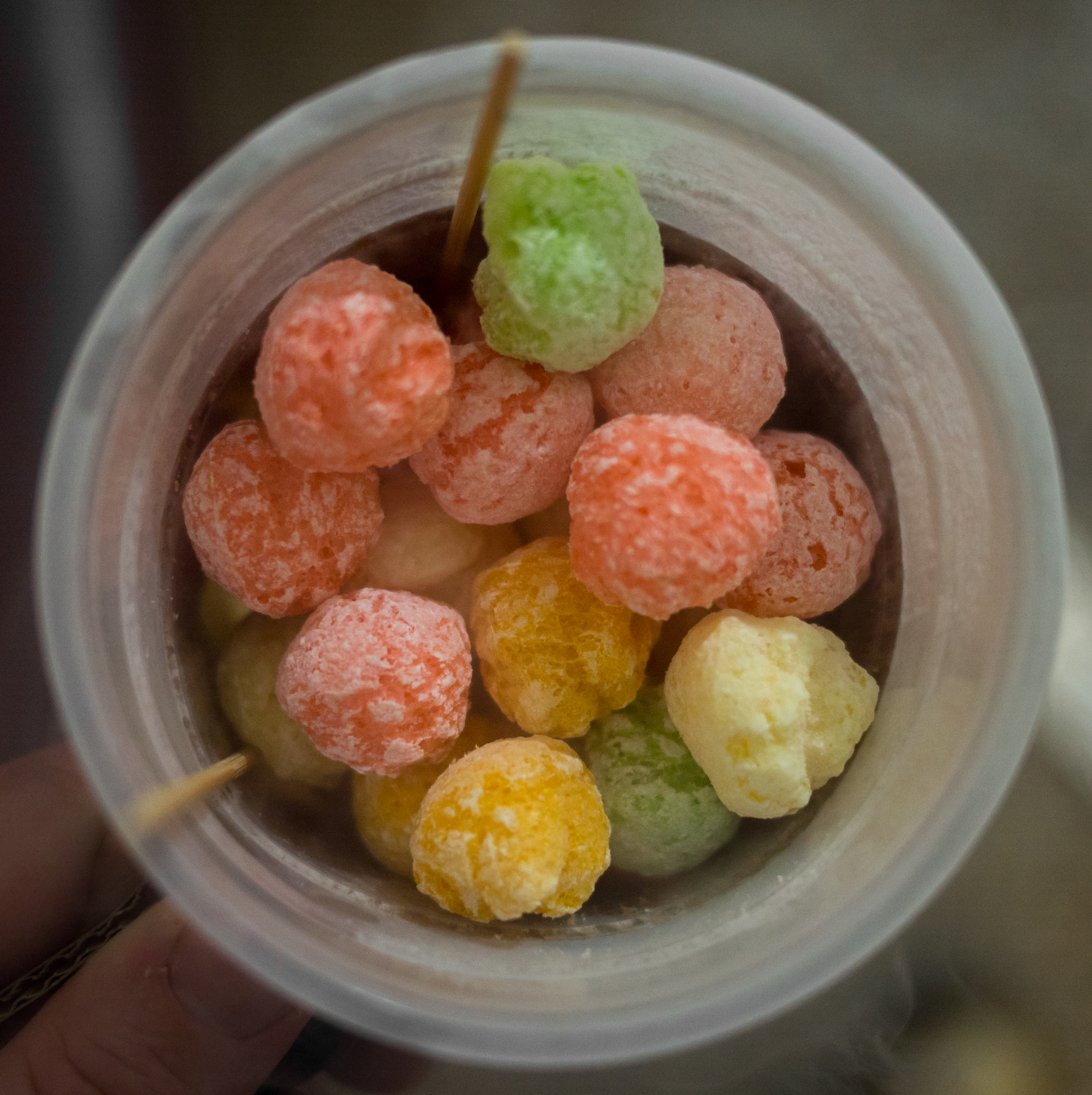
Dragon's Breath served in San Francisco

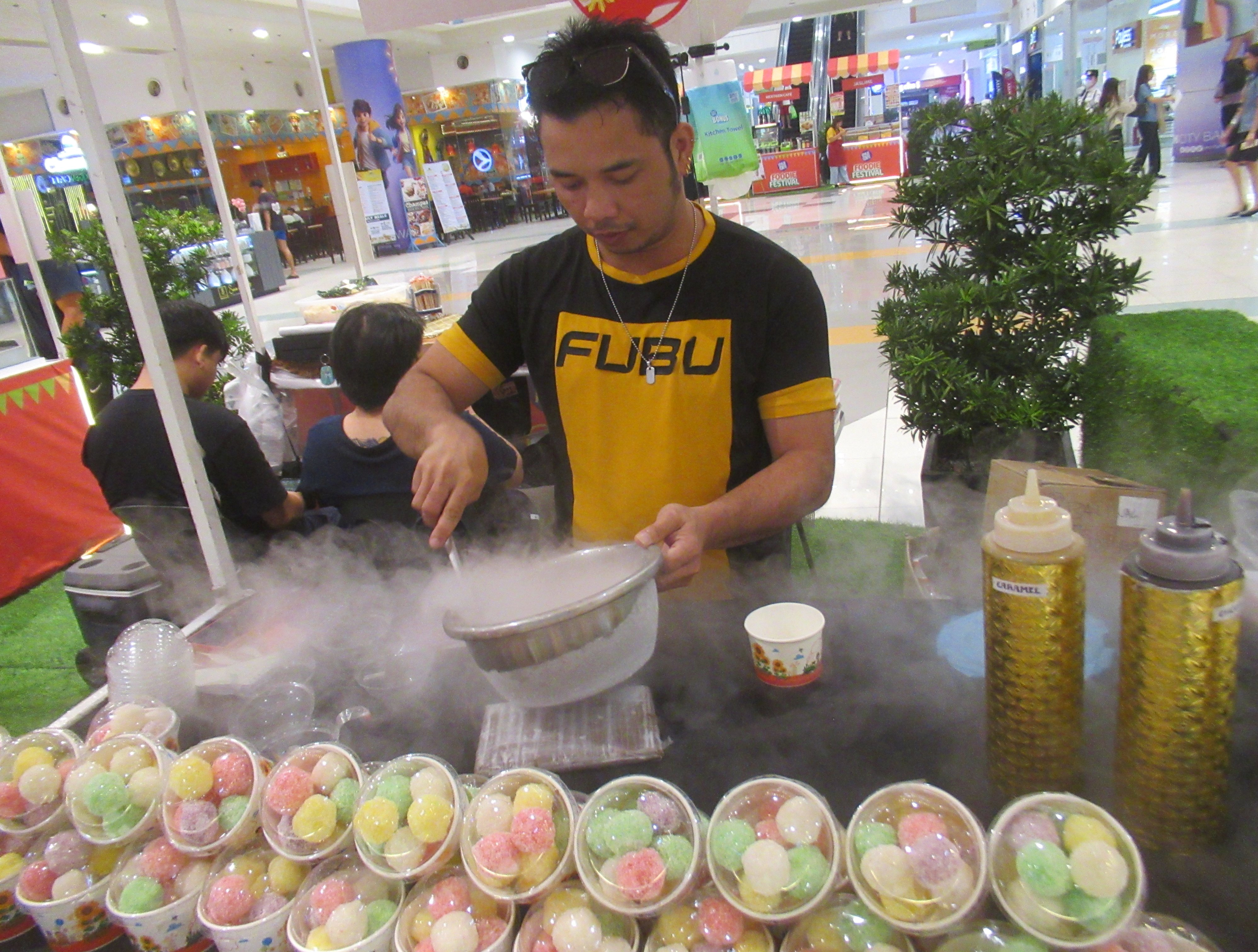
Filipino vendor mixes cereal balls with liquid nitrogen

Dragon's Breath is a frozen dessert made from cereal dipped in liquid nitrogen. When placed in the eater's mouth, it produces vapors which comes out of the nose and mouth, giving the dessert its name.

== Description ==
Dragon's Breath, also marketed as Dragon Puff and Heaven's Breath, is made using colorful cereal balls described as having a flavor similar to Froot Loops. The cereal is dipped in liquid nitrogen and served in a cup. The eater uses a stick to skewer the balls. Once in the eater's mouth, the cold of the liquid nitrogen combines with the warmth of the mouth to release visible vapors out of the nose and mouth.

According to Glutto Digest, Dragon's Breath was originally invented and served at a “minibar” by José Andrés in 2008. After Andrés stopped serving it at his LA restaurant, The Bazaar, in 2009, it spread throughout Taiwan, South Korea, and the Philippines. It gained popularity when Los Angeles-based chain, Chocolate Chair, added it to its menu.

Dragon's Breath is noted for the spectacle of its consumption more than its flavor, with several publications commenting on its compatibility with Instagram trends.

== Safety ==
Liquid nitrogen is used in several foods and drinks to quickly freeze them or for the vapors it produces. Its consumption poses several dangers to humans. The extreme cold temperature can cause damage to human tissue, and the displacement of oxygen by nitrogen can cause asphyxiation.

Several injuries have been reported. At a shop in Singapore in 2016, a woman was burned when the dessert stuck to her gums. In October 2017, two children at the Pensacola Interstate Fair in Florida were injured while handling or consuming Dragon's Breath. A 14-year-old suffered a burn on her thumb from contact with the frozen dessert. Another child suffered second degree burns on the roof of her mouth. Following complaints, the fair's general manager announced the vendor would not be allowed to sell Dragon's Breath at the next year's event.

In 2018, the United States Food and Drug Administration issued an alert warning that the colorful balls are a danger to children afflicted with asthma, and can cause severe skin and internal organ damage, burns, breathing difficulty, and life-threatening injuries.
