= Shadowlands (video game) =

1992 video game

- Developer: Teque London
- Publisher: Domark
- Designer: Dean Lester
- Artist: Mark Anthony
- Composer: Matt Furniss
- Platforms: Amiga, Atari ST, MS-DOS
- Release: 1992
- Genre: Role-playing
- Mode: Single-player

Shadowlands is a role-playing video game published by Domark in 1992 for MS-DOS, Amiga, and Atari ST.

== Gameplay ==
The player controls a party of four adventurers, each of which may be controlled individually; this is sometimes required for puzzle-solving. Characters in Shadowlands are governed by four statistics: Combat, Magik, Strength, and Health. Characters are aligned to one of four roles: Magician, Warrior, Orc, and Priest. Characters must eat and drink, or they may die. An important aspect in Shadowlands is light: in dark areas torches are needed for characters to see, and they burn out over time. Small creatures, such as rats, follow the player and drain characters' health gradually each turn, and they cannot be killed. Scorpions act similarly, but do not follow the player and instead must be avoided.

== Plot ==
Shadowlands is a fantasy role-playing game in which the player controls four characters either as a party or as individuals.

== Development ==
The Amiga version of Shadowlands began development in November 1990, and was released in March 1992. British gaming magazine The One interviewed Dean Lester, the designer for Shadowlands' Amiga version, for information regarding its development in a pre-release interview. Shadowlands was conceived due to the popularity of RPGs at the time, with Lester particularly citing Dungeon Master's success, stating that "We'd all played and enjoyed Dungeon Master and we were looking forward to a really long project as well. We'd only had about six months on a lot of our previous work, particularly, the coin-op conversions, and we felt that a 12-month project would really show what we could achieve." Due to Dungeon Master's impact on the 16-bit gaming scene, Lester notes RPGs as an 'increasingly important element of the gaming market in the future', further stating that "Expectations are getting higher as standards improve, and the best way to fulfil those expectations is with a complex mouse-driven strategy game, not just another shoot'em up." Shadowlands is designed with an 'arcade-style' isometric viewpoint and its controls & UI are 'simplified' due to Lester's design philosophy that "if a game system is relatively familiar to games players, it has more chance of success".

Shadowlands utilizes burst scrolling, stating in regards to this design decision that "A burst scrolling isometric game is rare: flick-screen RPGs tend to be room-based and lose integrity; and it would be unplayable if the screen scrolled every time a character moved." Further expressing Dungeon Master as an inspiration, Lester states that "There are lots of things we liked about Dungeon Master but we wanted to do it differently. So we divided the game into components, such as the view, lighting, fighting and control system, and we tried to combine some of the breakthroughs they made with our own input." Lester notes his belief that Shadowlands' difficulty comes not from its scope, but "the combination of puzzles, monsters, traps and loads of objects to find and use. We reckon that if players want to discover everything they'll have to spend an average of six to seven hours on every level ... There'll be several different ways to complete each stage, allowing you to progress in a random fashion - if the structure was too linear it would ruin the fun." Poisoned food was considered as an addition to Shadowlands during development, however Lester notes his hesitance in doing so, expressing that "there's nothing more annoying than searching for something for ages, and then eating it only to find it kills you. We've tried as far as possible to take out all the frustration."

Lester further notes how Shadowlands responds to different playstyles, stating that it "senses how good you are: if you're particularly adept at some puzzles you might find there are a couple of extra monsters." Determining when walls should appear and disappear was a complication in Shadowlands' development, and Lester expresses in regards to this that "The problem with scrolling an isometric game is that you want to leave in the background walls so that you can feature switches and objects, but you want to leave out the foreground walls so you can see your characters. Flick-screen games solve this by just putting in an archway and omitting the wall - but in Shadowlands, once one of the characters walks round the other side of a wall it should reappear. The compromise we reached makes the foreground walls disappear when your character is near, and indicates them with a red line." Light is an important gameplay aspect in Shadowlands, and Lester states that "Light is more than a graphical effect, it also allows you to use objects like photo receptors to activate switches or open doors. Some monsters, too, are attracted to light, so that you can create decoys - others are repelled by it." Lester also notes the use of lighting as a fog of war, stating that "The beauty of the limited vision system we're using is that you often just get vague glimpses of objects lying around, particularly when your light source is fading".

Shadowlands' graphics were created by Mark Anthony, and were drawn traditionally on paper, and then digitized into 16-colour graphics. Shadowlands' graphics were one of the final aspects of the game to be designed; according to The One, "graphics are one of the last pieces of the jigsaw: all of the code has been finished and much of the design is complete", and upon the graphics' completion, the game was sent to Shadowlands' publisher Domark for playtesting. According to The One, Mark Anthony's "passion for Japanese-style graphics" influenced the anime artstyle used in Shadowlands' character portrait generator. Shadowlands' playable characters have 128 frames of animation. To save on memory, each of the four characters use the same animation, albeit with changed colours. On Amiga 512Ks, levels load in separately, while 1Mb Amigas use the extra memory as a RAM disc, and have reduced loading times.

== Reception ==
Reception

Review scores
Publication	Score
The One	93% (Amiga)
Dragon	4/5 (DOS)

Computer Gaming World gave the game a positive review, stating that "Shadowlands .... doesn't exactly break new ground, but it does have an approach that is unique and features that set it apart from the rest". The magazine liked the flexible approach to questing with one party or multiple parties, and the use of light and shadow to affect gameplay. The game was reviewed in 1993 in Dragon #192 by Hartley, Patricia, and Kirk Lesser in "The Role of Computers" column. The reviewers gave the game 4 out of 5 stars.

The One gave the Amiga version of Shadowlands an overall score of 93%, calling it "one of the best dungeon-delving role-playing games to come along since Eye of the Beholder." The One praises Shadowlands' design and gameplay, stating that "It's obvious right from the start that an awful lot of thought has gone into the game's design, from the easy-to-use controls to the use of light as more than just a graphical effect ... The real beauty of Shadowlands is that combat takes a back seat to the environment, but still manages to feature strongly enough to add excitement to the proceedings." The One praises Shadowlands' uniqueness, expressing that "The very fact that each of the four characters can be controlled independently of each other sets it apart from the likes of Cadaver, Dungeon Master, et al, and allows you to come up with all manner of strategies in fights and solutions to puzzles."

The One particularly praises Shadowlands' unique approach to items, stating that "Every object, no matter how small or insignificant, can be utilized effectively ... Apples are more than just food, you can drain them of their 'psychic energies', use them to set off hidden pressure plates or even throw them at monsters." The One however criticises the presence of 'small monsters' such as rats and scorpions, which follow around the player characters and slowly drain their health, a feature they call 'questionable', and expresses that they find the need to eat and drink to "[detract] from the fun of the game" but notes the latter as a matter of personal opinion. The One calls Shadowlands "a glorious fantasy romp, mixing exactly the right amount of action with thought and wrapping it all up with a completely absorbing atmosphere."
