= Dragon Lord (video game) =

1990 strategy video game

Dragon Lord Dragon's Breath
- Developer: Andrew Bailey
- Publisher: Palace Software
- Designer: Simon Hunter
- Composer: David Hanlon
- Platforms: Amiga, Atari ST, MS-DOS
- Release: 1990
- Genre: Strategy
- Mode: Single-player

Dragon Lord, also known as Dragon's Breath, is a 1990 computer game for the Amiga, Atari ST and MS-DOS published by Palace Software and Spotlight Software. A fantasy-themed strategy game, players control one of three dragon lords competing to find the (game-winning) talisman. This goal is achieved by raising dragons, empowering them via alchemy, and then sending them to conquer towns.

== Reception ==
Computer Gaming World stated that "many will find game play painfully slow", but deserved some praise for its novel subject and "innovative game play". The magazine concluded that Dragon Lord would appeal to strategy gamers rather than to adventurers.
