= Magnetic boots =

Magnetic boots are boots that are magnetic, which allows them to attach to the ferrous floor or hulls of a spacecraft during weightlessness, and presumably would allow someone to walk around the cabin of a spacecraft.

== Use by astronauts ==
Magnetic boots have not yet been used in actual space flight. Astronauts on the International Space Station use foot straps to stand in place at workstations or on exercise equipment.

== Use in construction industry ==
Construction workers and in particular steel roofers are exposed to risk of fall. According to the Bureau of Labor Statistics, nearly 22,000 falls happen per year. More than 400 workers die from them every year.

Steel roofs are more durable than other types of roof. They are also one of the most slippery. To improve workers stability and safety, some companies like Navail LLC provide magnetic work boots for construction workers.

== Use in science fiction ==
Although many science fiction works assume some type of artificial gravity or use rotation to "create" gravity, magnetic boots still feature for purposes of exterior repairs or in emergency situations.

Magnetic boots were notably used in Star Trek VI: The Undiscovered Country to stage a surprise attack by disabling the artificial gravity on a ship and so providing a tactical advantage to attackers wearing them. The investigation of who had access to magnetic boots featured prominently in the plot. Other Star Trek depictions include Star Trek: First Contact where the crew battle cyborgs on the hull of the ship and Star Trek: Enterprise where they are used for hull repairs.

Such boots were featured in The Adventures of Tintin comic Explorers on the Moon, to prevent the characters from floating around in the cabin if the artificial gravity failed.

The Celestial Voyages historical science fiction series by Jeff Provine uses magnetic boots as the main sense of balance in its Edwardian starships.

In the Ratchet & Clank series, one of the gadgets is a pair of "Magneboots", which are used to traverse special ventilation shafts in the first installment of the series Ratchet & Clank. Though in Ratchet & Clank: Going Commando and later, the Magneboots were replaced with the Gravity Boots, allowing one to walk up special vents and surfaces, to jump and walk like normal, and also to use weapons and other gadgets.

In 2010: Odyssey Two, it is stated that Soviets view artificial gravity as a luxury, and as such their vessel the Alexi Leonov features very limited artificial gravity. The crew uses magnetic shoes to easily walk around the ship. Magnetic shoes are a running theme of the series and are used by crews of small Pan Am shuttles as well.

In the novel and television series The Expanse, characters frequently use magnetized boots to keep themselves upright when not using thrust acceleration to simulate gravity.

== See also ==
- Artificial gravity
