= Francesco Carlà =

Italian journalist and entrepreneur

Francesco Carlà is an Italian journalist, professor, and investor.

Since 2000 he has published several books, mainly in the economic-financial field, and since 2005 he has been dealing with some columns, this time in newspapers such as Panorama and L'Espresso.

He was a professor in Theories and Techniques of New Media, eCulture and Financial Communication at the IULM University until 2008.

== See also ==
- Simulman (video game)

== Bibliography ==
- AA.VV., Annuario dei giornalisti italiani 2012, Ordine dei Giornalisti, 2012, p. 686.
