= Girlschool discography =

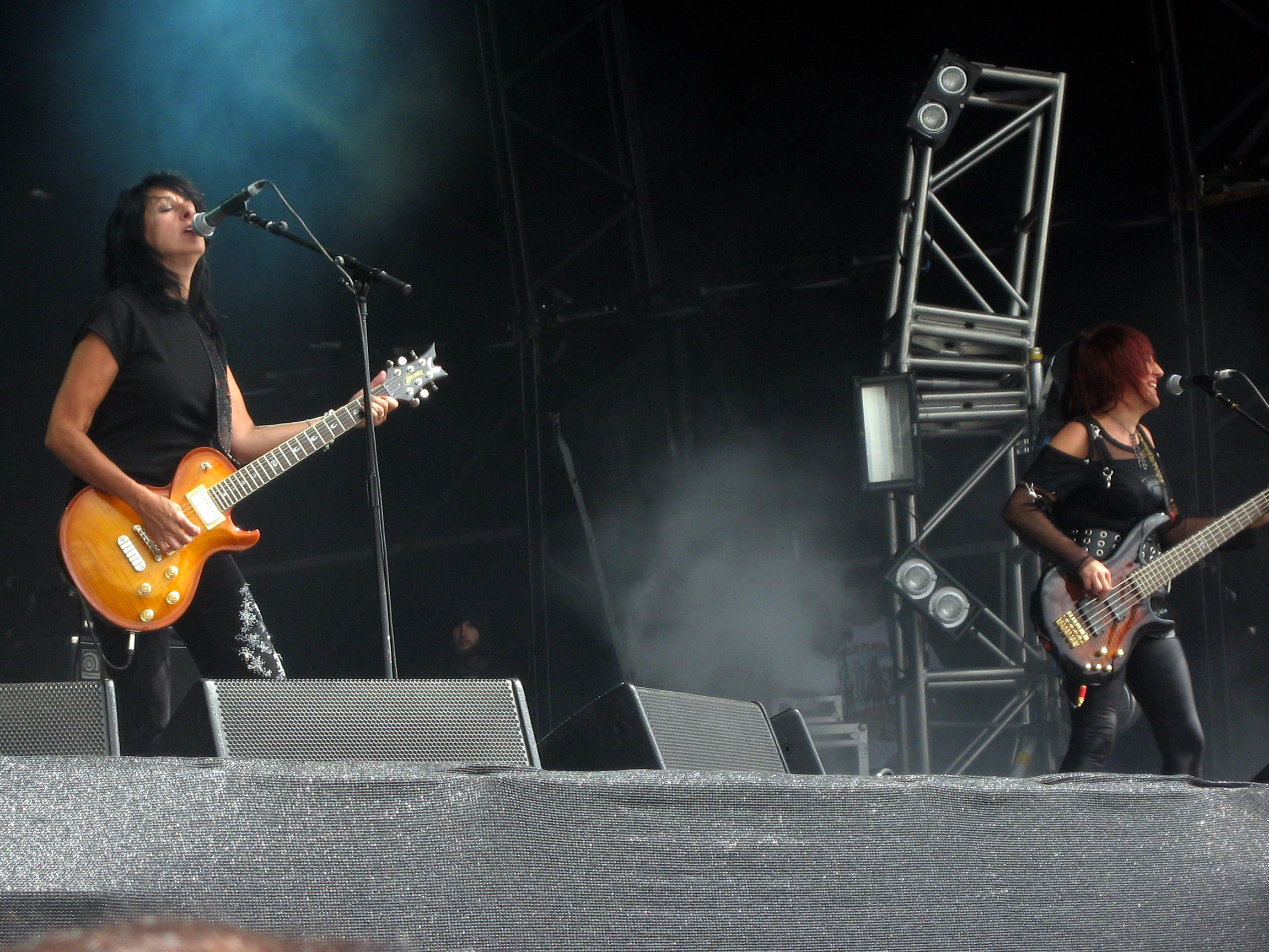
- Girlschool live at Bloodstock Open Air in 2009
- Studio albums: 14
- Extended plays: 6
- Live albums: 4
- Compilation albums: 14
- Singles: 13
- Video albums: 3
- Music videos: 11
- Split albums: 2

The discography of Girlschool, a British all-female heavy metal band, spans over 30 years of a career and consists of thirteen studio albums, six EPs and a large number of compilations. The band was formed in 1978 by Kim McAuliffe, Enid Williams, Kelly Johnson and Denise Dufort. Their first release was the single "Take It All Away" for the small British rock/punk label City Records (November 1979). The song did not chart, but came to the ear of Lemmy Kilmister and of Motörhead manager Doug Smith, who made Girlschool the supporting band on the Overkill tour and managed to get them a contract with the wealthy label Bronze Records.

During the explosion of the new wave of British heavy metal phenomenon, Girlschool released for Bronze four studio albums and many singles, which entered the British charts. Their greatest success came with the split EP St. Valentine's Day Massacre, recorded with Motörhead, which reached number five on the UK Single Chart. The band's following album Hit and Run peaked at number five on the UK Album Chart.

The band success in the United Kingdom rapidly declined in the following years, with the consequence of Girlschool signing for the US label PolyGram in 1985. As a five-piece group they released the album Running Wild, only for the American market, without any charting success. Alone among the band's studio albums, Running Wild would not be reissued in any format until its 2014 CD release. The band signed a new contract with the British label GWR in 1986 and released other two studio albums, before going into quiescence.

In 1989, Castle Communications, a company specialized in cheap reissues of old recordings, obtained the rights for Girlschool’s back catalogue from the bankrupt Bronze Records and later from GWR. During the 1990s, Castle licensed the songs to various labels specialized in mid-priced editions, reissuing also the band studio albums on economic double album compilations on CD. When Castle was acquired by Sanctuary Records in 2000, the rights of the songs changed hands again. In 2004, the new label released re-mastered editions full of bonus tracks of Girlschool's first four studio albums. The Sanctuary Records Group, which was absorbed by Universal Music Group in 2007 but was later divested by the latter through a sale in 2012, now owns the rights to Girlschool's old material, while Warner Music Group handles all global distribution and sales. Universal owns the rights to Running Wild, the band's only Mercury album released exclusively in the United States. The American rights to their other albums originally issued by Mercury were transferred to Warner Music's Alternative Distribution Alliance.

The band continued their recording career with four self-produced albums distributed by British indie label Communiqué, which received good reviews but no significant sale results. Their eleventh album Legacy was instead released by Wacken Records in 2008 and distributed by SPV/Steamhammer, followed by two more albums in 2011 and 2015 for WMG's German label UDR.

Girlschool's songs appear also on many heavy metal compilations published all over the world, often associated with other notable bands of the NWOBHM, such as Motörhead, Tygers of Pan Tang, Saxon, Angel Witch and Tank.

== Albums ==
Girlschool received gold discs in Canada in 1982 for the sales of the album Hit and Run

=== Studio albums ===
| Year | Album details | Peak chart positions | | | | Certifications (sales thresholds) |
| Year | Album details | UK | CAN | NZ | US | Certifications (sales thresholds) |
|---|---|---|---|---|---|---|
| 1980 | Demolition: Released: 30 June 1980; Label: Bronze (BRON 525); Format: LP, CS, CD | 28 | — | — | — | |
| 1981 | Hit and Run: Released: 10 April 1981; Label: Bronze (BRON 534); Format: LP, CS, CD | 5 | 50 | 49 | 182* | CAN: Gold |
| 1982 | Screaming Blue Murder: Released: 7 June 1982; Label: Bronze (BRON 541); Format: LP, CS, CD | 27 | 84 | — | 207 | |
| 1983 | Play Dirty: Released: 8 November 1983; Label: Bronze (BRON 548); Format: LP, CS, CD | 66 | — | — | 207 | |
| 1985 | Running Wild: Released: 1 February 1985; Label: Mercury (422-824611-1); Format: LP, CS | — | — | — | — | |
| 1986 | Nightmare at Maple Cross: Released: May 1986; Label: GWR (GWLP 2); Format: LP, CS, CD | — | — | — | — | |
| 1988 | Take a Bite: Released: 3 October 1988; Label: GWR (GWLP 21); Format: LP, CS, CD | — | — | — | — | |
| 1992 | Girlschool: Released: November 1992; Label: Communiqué (CMG CD006); Format: CD | — | — | — | — | |
| 2002 | 21st Anniversary: Not That Innocent: Released: 14 January 2002; Label: Communiqué (CMG CD024); Format: CD | — | — | — | — | |
| 2004 | Believe**: Released: 26 July 2004; Label: Communiqué (CMG CD027); Format: CD | — | — | — | — | |
| 2008 | Legacy: Released: 24 October 2008; Label: Wacken Records - SPV/Steamhammer (SPV92732 CD); Format: CD | — | — | — | — | |
| 2011 | Hit and Run – Revisited: Released: 26 September 2011; Label: Wacken Records - UDR (UDR 0051); Format: LP, CD | — | — | — | — | |
| 2015 | Guilty as Sin: Released: 13 November 2015; Label: UDR (UDR 056P01); Format: LP, CD | — | — | — | — | |
| 2023 | WTFortyfive?: Released: 28 July 2023; Label: Silver Lining Music (SLM050P42); Format: LP, CD | — | — | — | — | |
"—" denotes releases that did not chart or were not released in that country.
* the album was a compilation of songs from Demolition and Hit and Run
** the album was also re-issued by the band themselves in combination with the DVD Around the World

=== Live albums ===
| Year | Album details |
|---|---|
| 1995 | Girlschool Live: Released: 1 November 1995; Label: Communiqué (CMG CD013); Format: CD |
| 1997 | King Biscuit Flower Hour Presents Girlschool: Released: 17 June 1997; Label: King Biscuit Flower Hour (70710-88032-2); Format: CD |
| 1998 | Race with the Devil Live: Released: 24 April 1998; Label: Receiver (RRCD 254); Format: CD |
| 2002 | Race with the Devil: Released: 6 June 2002; Label: Disky (SI 794122); Format: CD |

=== Compilation albums ===
| Year | Album details |
|---|---|
| 1986 | Race with the Devil: Released: 1986; Label: Raw Power / Castle Communications (RAW LP013); Format: double LP |
| 1989 | Cheers You Lot!: Released: 1989; Label: Razor Records (METALPM 127); Format: LP, CS, CD |
| 1991 | C'mon Let's Go: Released: September 1991; Label: Castle - Marble Arch (CMA CD 149); Format: CS, CD |
| 1991 | The Collection: Released: 1991; Label: Castle (CCSCD 314); Format: LP, CD |
| 1993 | The Best of Girlschool: Released: 1993; Label: Castle - Dojo (DOJO CD 103); Format: CD |
| 1994 | From the Vaults: Released: 1994; Label: Castle - Sequel (NEM CD 642); Format: CD |
| 1997 | Emergency: Released: 1997; Label: Snapper (SMD CD 126); Format: CD |
| 1998 | The Collection (2CD): Released: 1998; Label: Renaissance - Castle (CCSCD 830); Format: CD |
| 1999 | Can't Keep a Good Girl Down: Released: 18 November 1999; Label: Delta Music (47 005); Format: CD |
| 2002 | The Very Best of Girlschool: Released: 2002; Label: Castle - Sanctuary (NEM CD 642); Format: CD |
| 2003 | Wild at Heart: Released: 2003; Label: Pickwick (781022); Format: CD |
| 2007 | The Singles (2CD): Released: 2007; Label: Lemon Recordings - Cherry Red (CD LEM DD101); Format: CD |
| 2012 | Private Lessons (2CD): Released: 2012; Label: Southworld Recordings; Format: CD |
| 2013 | The Bronze Years (4CD): Released: 2013; Label: Lemon Recordings (CD LEMBOX 210); Format: CD |

=== Split albums ===
| Year | Album | Other artist | Songs |
|---|---|---|---|
| 1998 | British Steel: Heavyweights of Metal Live & Loud: Label: Music Collection International | Angel Witch, Samson, Tank | "C'mon Let's Go", "Emergency", "Take It All Away" |
| 2003 | The Second Wave: 25 Years of NWOBHM: Label: Communiqué | Oliver/Dawson Saxon, Tygers of Pan Tang | "Passion", "Mad Mad Sister", Coming Your Way", "Believe", "Innocent" |

== Extended plays ==
| Year | Album details | Peak chart positions | Certifications (sales thresholds) | Notes |
| Year | Album details | UK | Certifications (sales thresholds) | Notes |
|---|---|---|---|---|
| 1981 | St. Valentine's Day Massacre: Released: 13 February 1981; Label: Bronze | 5 | UK: Silver | a collaboration between Motörhead and Girlschool. |
| 1981 | Hard Rock on 12 Inch / Stay Clean: Released: 1981; Label: Bronze | — | | split EP by Motörhead and Girlschool, containing the songs "Please Don't Touch" and "Demolition Boys" (live) |
| 1982 | Live and More: Released: January 1982; Label: Victor | — | | released only in Japan before the 1982 tour |
| 1982 | Wildlife: Released: 29 March 1982; Label: Bronze | 58 | | |
| 1983 | 1-2-3-4 Rock and Roll: Released: August 1983; Label: Bronze | — | | released also as a 7 inch single, with an edited version of "1-2-3-4 Rock and Roll". |
| 2015 | Propaganda!: Released: 2015; Label: UDR/Morriello Music | — | | |
"—" denotes releases that did not chart or were not released in that country.

== Singles ==
| Year | Titles | Peak chart positions | | Album |
| Year | Titles | UK | AUS | Album |
|---|---|---|---|---|
| 1979 | "Take It All Away / It Could Be Better" | — | — | Non-album track |
| 1980 | "Emergency / Furniture Fire" | — | — | Demolition |
| 1980 | "Nothing to Lose / Baby Doll" | — (Note: This single did not enter the UK Singles Chart, but did reach number 101 on the Record Business Singles Chart.) | — | Demolition |
| 1980 | "Race with the Devil / Take It All Away" | 49 | — | Demolition |
| 1980 | "Yeah Right / The Hunter" | — (Note: This single did not enter the UK Singles Chart, but did reach number 83 on the Record Business Singles Chart.) | — | Hit and Run |
| 1981 | "Hit and Run / Tonight" | 32 | — | Hit and Run |
| 1981 | "C'mon Let's Go / Tonight (live)" | 42 | — | Hit and Run |
| 1982 | "Don't Call It Love / Wildlife" | — | — | Screaming Blue Murder |
| 1983 | "20th Century Boy / Breaking All the Rules" | — | — | Play Dirty |
| 1984 | "Burning in the Heat / Surrender" | — | — | Play Dirty |
| 1986 | "I'm the Leader of the Gang (I Am) with Gary Glitter / Never Too Late" | — | 12 | Nightmare at Maple Cross |
| 1987 | "All Day All Night / Play with Fire" | — | — | Nightmare at Maple Cross |
| 1988 | "Head over Heels" (US only promo single) | — | — | Take a Bite |
| 1988 | "Fox on the Run" (US only promo single) | — | — | Take a Bite |
"—" denotes singles that did not chart, have not charted yet, or were not released.

== Other appearances ==
| Year | Song | Album | Comments |
|---|---|---|---|
| 1986 | "Nowhere to Run" | Reform School Girls soundtrack | Rhino Records RNLP 70310 |
| 1989 | "I'm the Leader of the Gang (I Am)" (live) | Gary Glitter's Gangshow: The Gang, the Band, the Leader | Recorded during the 1989 tour in support of Gary Glitter. |
| 1994 | "Twas the Night Before Christmas" | X-Mas: The Metal Way | Metal version of a Christmas classic. |
| 2008 | "Auld Lang Syne" | We Wish You a Metal Xmas and a Headbanging New Year deluxe edition | Metal version of a Christmas classic previously released for download on Eagle Rock Entertainment website. |
| 2008 | "Metropolis" | Sheep in Wolves' Clothing: A Tribute to Motorhead | Motörhead cover recorded with Eddie Clarke for Motörhead fan club tribute album, which preceded its release on Legacy by a few months |

== Video albums ==
| Year | Video details | Notes |
|---|---|---|
| 1985 | Play Dirty Live: Released: 1985; Label: Castle (CMV 1017); Format: VHS | The show was filmed in London on 7 December 1984, before the US-only release of the album Running Wild. It was directed by Marc Over and released in the USA by PolyGram Videos. |
| 2005 | Live from London: Released: 2005; Label: Iguana Project (B0009U5DGW); Format: DVD | This is a re-release in DVD of Play Dirty Live by the British label Iguana Project, specialized in new editions on DVD of old material. The DVD has the same content of the VHS, with the addition of a presentation of the musicians. |
| 2005 | Around the World: Released: 2005; Label: self-released; Format: DVD | Self-released DVD, containing live footage from tours in the 2000s, interviews and photos. It was sold through the Girlschool Official website combined with the album Believe. |

== Music videos ==
| Year | Song | Director | Ref |
|---|---|---|---|
| 1980 | "Race with the Devil" | ??? | |
| 1980 | "Emergency" | ??? | |
| 1980 | "Yeah Right" | ??? | |
| 1982 | "Don't Call It Love" | ??? | |
| 1982 | "Tush" | ??? | |
| 1983 | "20th Century Boy" | Sebastian Harris | |
| 1983 | "Play Dirty" | Sebastian Harris | |
| 1985 | "Running Wild" | ??? | |
| 1986 | "I'm the Leader of the Gang (I Am)" | ??? | |
| 1988 | "Fox on the Run" | Jean Pellerin | |
| 2004 | "Come On Up" | ??? | |
| 2005 | "Emergency" | ??? | |
| 2023 | "Are You Ready?" | ??? | |
