= List of Girlschool band members =

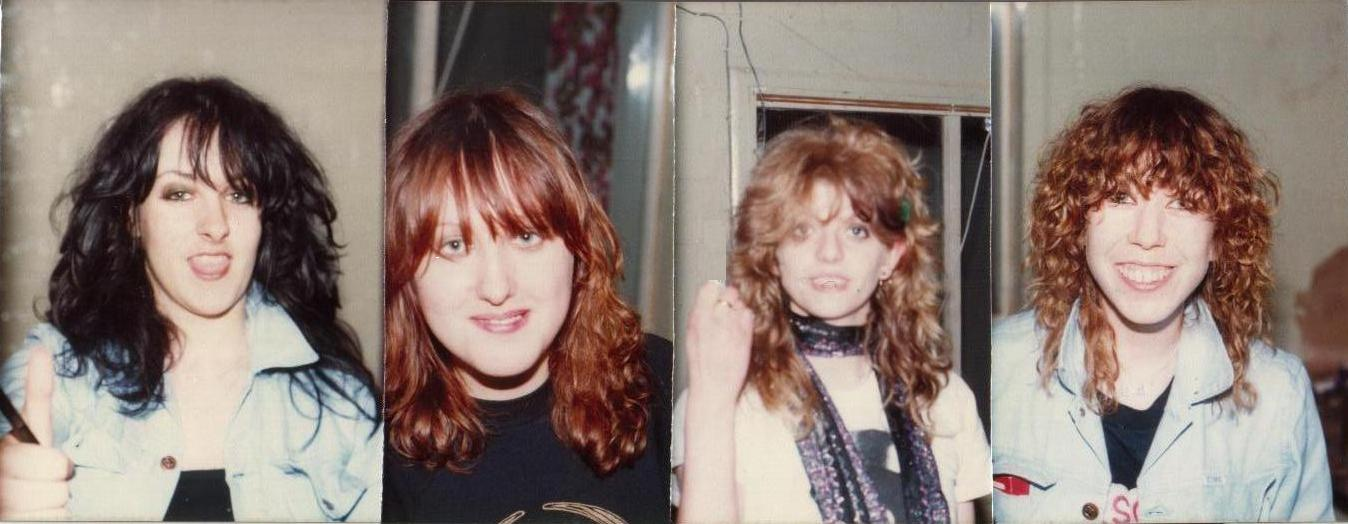
(left to right) Kim McAuliffe, Enid Williams, Kelly Johnson and Denise Dufort

(left to right) Kim McAuliffe, Gil Weston, Denise Dufort, Jackie Bodimead, Cris Bonacci

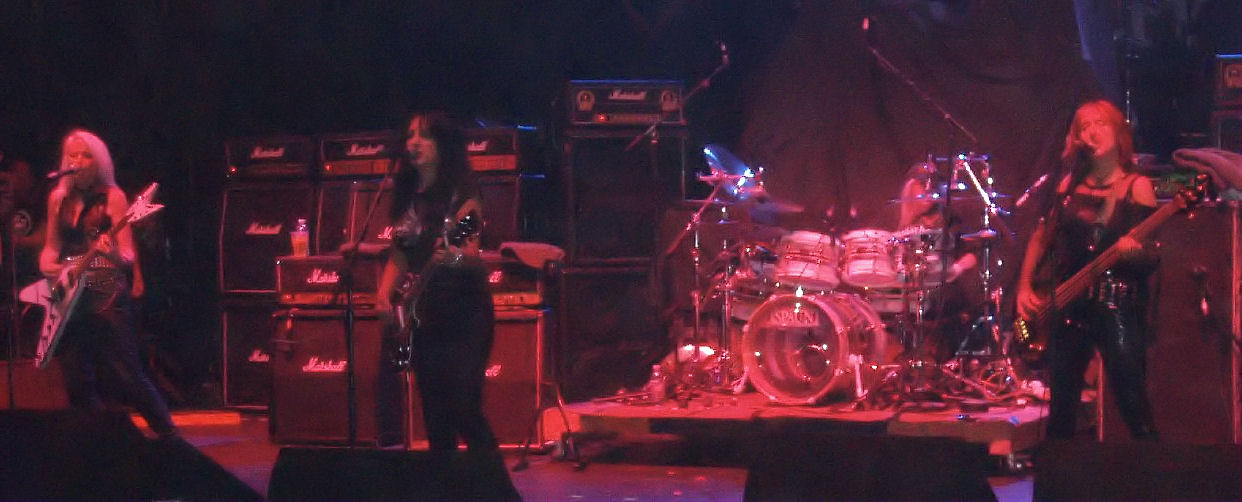
(left to right) Jackie Chambers, Kim McAuliffe, Denise Dufort and Enid Williams

Three lineups of Girlschool in 1981, 1985 and 2009

Girlschool are an all-female British rock band founded in 1978. The original members Kim McAuliffe, Enid Williams, Kelly Johnson and Denise Dufort came from the club cover band Painted Lady. During the early 1980s the band was one of the relevant groups of the new wave of British heavy metal (NWOBHM) movement, entering the British charts with both singles and albums. Unlike many heavy metal bands, Girlschool often had more than one lead vocalist; vocal duties in the 'classic' line-up were shared between Williams, McAuliffe and Johnson.

Williams was the first to leave the band, in 1982, under very stressful circumstances, and was replaced by punk rocker Gil Weston. Kelly Johnson left in 1984 and went to live in the United States.

In 1985, Girlschool veered towards a more commercial and American FM-friendly sound and expanded to a five-piece group, with Cris Bonacci replacing Johnson on lead guitar and Jackie Bodimead joining on lead vocals. This formation was short-lived; Bodimead left in 1986 and Girlschool then reverted to a four-piece line-up. More changes took place in 1987, when former Rock Goddess bass player Tracey Lamb replaced Weston, and in 1992, when Jackie Carrera had a short stint with the band.

In 1993, Kelly Johnson came back to England from the US and found her place again in Girlschool, replacing the departing Bonacci. Johnson and Lamb remained in the band until 2000, when Jackie Chambers and the returning Enid Williams took their places in a line-up that lasted until Williams left again in early 2019. Lamb had been intended to replace Williams on a temporary basis, but became a full-time member later that year.

Lamb parted ways with the band in June 2024. Olivia Airey joined as new bassist the following month.

== Member information ==
=== Kim McAuliffe ===
McAuliffe (born in London, 13 May 1959) is a founding member of Girlschool and acted as front-woman and spokesperson of the group. She was pivotal in most of Girlschool's career decisions, from their first line-up, to their change of image and sound in the mid-1980s, to their return to a rawer kind of music after their American debacle. She is a prolific songwriter and also known for her romantic relationships with other rock musicians (Eddie Clarke, Gary Owens, Michael Monroe, Nick Lashley, Cozy Powell). In the 1990s, McAuliffe worked with punk singer Beki Bondage and was later one of the presenters of the Raw Power TV show on British commercial TV channel ITV. McAuliffe featured with Cris Bonacci on the NWOBHM-celebrating album All Stars in 1990 and also on the album Metal Christmas in 1994, with Paul Di'Anno and Eddie Clarke. Besides her work with Girlschool, McAuliffe also played in the late 1990s with the cover band Born to Be Girls, which performed at various summer biker rallies. She had been the sole lead singer in Girlschool from 1986 to 1993, a duty that she then shared with Enid Williams until the latter's departure in 2019.

=== Denise Dufort ===
Dufort (born in London, 18 October 1958) is the third founding member of Girlschool who is still active. Before joining, she had played in a few punk bands and had become a fan of Painted Lady, the cover band formed by Kim McAuliffe and Enid Williams in their school days. She is the sister of British drummer Dave Dufort, drummer in the NWOBHM band Angel Witch. Denise Dufort has always been present in every formation of the band and had a long relationship with Girlschool's road manager Tim Warhurst. When working with Girlschool, she also played with the post-punk band Au Pairs. She manages web communications for the band.

=== Jackie Chambers ===
Chambers (born in Leeds, 27 March 1964) is a self-taught guitarist who played in some punk bands in her native Leeds and then in London, before starting to write music with Kim McAuliffe around 1995. She shared a flat in London for seven years with Kelly Johnson, and both Johnson and Cris Bonacci assisted her in becoming an accomplished lead guitarist, in order that she might replace them in the band. Chambers' debut performance with the band was at Venue 27, Luton, England, on 5 October 2000. She soon became a driving force for the band, contributing both to the band's stage image and as a songwriter. In 2007, Chambers became a member of the reformed Blitzkrieg, a British punk band from Southport. She divided her time between London and Los Angeles, where she composed and performed her own music until March 2012, when she returned to live in Leeds. In 2015 she formed a new band alongside her work with Girlschool called Syteria, a pop-punk band in Yorkshire.

=== Tracey Lamb ===
Lamb (born in Bishop Auckland, 17 June 1963) was a founding member of Rock Goddess, another all-female metal act originated in the new wave of British heavy metal. She quit Rock Goddess in 1983 and briefly substituted Gil Weston in Girlschool for a tour in Israel. The same year, Lamb formed with Jackie Bodimead, Cris Bonacci, Kat Burbella and Suzie Roll the all-female band She, which never stepped outside the English club scene and disbanded in 1985. Lamb started a new project called The Perfect Mothers but, when Weston left Girlschool for good, she was immediately recruited to replace her and remained in the band for three years. In 1993, she came back to the fold after the sudden resignation of Jackie Carrera. She remained until 2000, when she left the band together with her friend Kelly Johnson. In 2005, she started a new rock band called Rock 'n' Roll Gypsies, which worked the British rock club scene, but remained without any recording contract. She moved to Spain to work as a gym instructor and manager, and finally rejoined the reformed Rock Goddess in 2014. In 2018, Lamb left them again. Following the departure of Enid Williams in January 2019, Lamb started working with Girlschool for a third time. 18 June 2024, the band announced her third amicable departure from the band in a post on their Facebook page, stating that "Tracey has given us a brilliant last 5 years, in what was her third tenure as the band's bass player during its 46 year history."

=== Enid Williams ===
Williams (born in London, 28 April 1960) is another founding member of Girlschool and one of the three lead vocalists singing in the first two albums of the band. She left the band in 1982, at the time of maximum success and workload for the group. She formed the same year the short-lived band Framed. She then completed her education and worked composing and performing music for theatres and musicals, becoming later an actress and a professional astrologer. She remained always in contact with her former band mates and joined them in the early 90s for the She-Devils and Strange Girls experience. She rejoined the group in 2000 after the departure of Kelly Johnson and Tracey Lamb, taking back her lead vocalist slot and introducing lyrics about social and political matters. She once again left the band in late January 2019.

=== Kelly Johnson ===
Johnson (born in London, 20 June 1958; died 15 July 2007) was a founding member of the band and shared with Kim McAuliffe the bulk of song writing in the first four albums of Girlschool. Her taste for pop music was balanced in the songs of the first albums by the punk and heavy metal influence of the other band members, but it became more evident in the album Play Dirty. Her tall figure and blonde hair made her a strong visual focal point for the male-dominated heavy metal audience of the time, while her lead guitar playing became a term of comparison for who followed her in the ranks of the band. She was also the third lead singer in the original line-up. In most Girlschool songs, lead vocals are performed by lead vocalist & rhythm guitarist Kim McAuliffe and by lead vocalist and bass guitarist Enid Williams, but there are some notable exceptions, in which Kelly played lead vocals, such as "Hit and Run", "C'mon Let's Go", "The Hunter", "Please Don't Touch" (Performed with Motörhead as part of the St. Valentine's Day Massacre EP), "Wildlife", "Breakdown", "20th Century Boy, "Future Flash", among other songs in which Kelly also played lead vocals. She left Girlschool at the beginning of 1984 and moved to Los Angeles, California, to live with Vicki Blue, former bassist of The Runaways. She spent ten years of her life writing and playing her own music and also working outside the music scene in L.A. She came back to the United Kingdom and to her place in Girlschool in 1993 and remained until 2000, when she was diagnosed with cancer. She remained associated with the others, playing the occasional gig, instructing her substitute and gathering photos and material for a band biography. On 15 July 2007, Kelly Johnson died of spinal cancer at the age of 49.

=== Ghislaine 'Gil' Weston ===
Weston (born 15 February 1958) on the recommendation of Lemmy replaced the original bass player Enid Williams, coming from the short-lived punk bands The Killjoys and Alternating. In January 1987, after five years with the group, she left as Gil Weston-Jones to spend her life with her partner and long time love Steve Pritchard, quitting the music business. She worked for the NHS in England after leaving Girlschool, but has since retired.

=== Cris Bonacci ===
Bonacci (born in Melbourne, Australia, 15 October 1964) is an Australian guitarist who moved to England to enjoy and exploit the British musical explosion of the early 1980s. In London Bonacci joined the hard rock band She, who played in the local rock clubs and whose line-up featured Jackie Bodimead and Tracey Lamb. She was recruited by Kim McAuliffe to replace Kelly Johnson in 1984; she remained with Girlschool for nine years, giving a large contribution to the sound of the band with her songs and her Jeff Beck-inspired guitar playing. In an interview in 1992, referring to her permanence in the band, she said "I've decided that I'll only be in the band as long as I'm doing other things as well" Bonacci left Girlschool soon afterward to pursue a career as touring musician, artist manager and record producer.

=== Jackie Bodimead ===
When Bodimead (born 13 November 1962) joined Girlschool, coming from the all-female band She, she was already an accomplished lead singer, having played in the hard rock and prog rock bands Stratagy and Canis Major. She shared lead vocals with Kim McAuliffe on the album Running Wild and went on a world tour with Girlschool in 1985. Unsatisfied with the heavier sound the band wanted to return to, she left the band to pursue a more commercial musical direction. She joined the British AOR band If Only and later released the solo album of melodic hard rock Don't Believe in Love, produced by Lea Hart.

=== Jackie Carrera ===
Carrera (also known as Jackie Carreira) came from the indie pop bands The Flatmates and The Caretaker Race, where she had been playing since 1988. She joined the band in 1991 and contributed to Girlschool's eponymous album in 1992. Carrera played with the band around the UK, Europe and Russia, but when the band was due to head to the US, she declined to travel and left the group amicably. She was replaced by returning bassist Tracey Lamb. After working as a session musician for several bands including Take That until 1996, Carrera is now a writer working mostly in theatre.

== Members ==
=== Current ===
Image	Name	Years active	Instruments	Release contributions
	Kim McAuliffe	1978–present	rhythm guitar; lead and backing vocals	all releases
	Denise Dufort	1978–present	drums	all releases
	Jackie Chambers	1999–present	lead guitar; backing vocals	all releases from 21st Anniversary: Not That Innocent (2002) onwards
	Olivia Airey	2024–present	bass; backing vocals	none

=== Former ===
Image	Name	Years active	Instruments	Release contributions
	Kelly Johnson	1978–1984; 1993–2000 (died 2007)	lead guitar; lead and backing vocals	all releases from Demolition (1980) to Play Dirty (1983); Girlschool Live (1995); Race with the Devil Live (1998); King Biscuit Flower Hour Presents Girlschool (1997); Race with the Devil (2002); 21st Anniversary: Not That Innocent (2002)
	Enid Williams	1978–1982; 2000–2019	bass guitar; lead and backing vocals	all releases from Demolition (1980) to Wildlife (EP, 1982) and from 21st Anniversary: Not That Innocent (2002) to Guilty as Sin (2015); Race with the Devil Live (1998)
	Ghislaine 'Gil' Weston	1982–1987	bass; backing and lead vocals	all releases from Screaming Blue Murder (1982) to Nightmare at Maple Cross (1986); King Biscuit Flower Hour Presents Girlschool (1997); Race with the Devil (2002)
	Cris Bonacci	1984–1992	lead guitar; backing vocals	all releases from Running Wild (1985) to Girlschool (1992)
	Jackie Bodimead	1984–1986	lead vocals; keyboards	Running Wild (1985)
	Tracey Lamb	1987–1991; 1993–2000; 2019–2024	bass; backing vocals	Take a Bite (1988); Girlschool Live (1995); 21st Anniversary: Not That Innocent (2002); WTFortyfive? (2023)
	Jackie Carrera	1992	bass; backing vocals	Girlschool (1992)

== Line-ups ==
Period	Members	Releases
1975 (as Painted Lady)	Kim McAuliffe - guitar, lead and backing vocals; Enid Williams - bass, lead and backing vocals; Tina Gayle - drums	none – rehearsals only
1975–1977 (as Painted Lady)	Kim McAuliffe - rhythm guitar, lead and backing vocals; Enid Williams - bass, lead and backing vocals; Val Lloyd - drums; Deirdre Cartwright - lead guitar	none – live shows only
1977–1978 (as Painted Lady)	Kim McAuliffe - rhythm guitar, lead and backing vocals; Enid Williams - bass, lead and backing vocals; Val Lloyd - drums; Kathy Valentine - lead guitar	none – live shows only
1978–1982 (as Girlschool from now on)	Kim McAuliffe – rhythm guitar, lead and backing vocals; Enid Williams – bass, lead and backing vocals; Kelly Johnson – lead guitar, lead and backing vocals; Denise Dufort – drums	Demolition (1980); Hit and Run (1981); Live and More (EP; 1982); Wildlife (EP; 1982); Race with the Devil Live (1998)
1982–1984	Kim McAuliffe – rhythm guitar, lead and backing vocals; Kelly Johnson – lead guitar, backing and lead vocals; Denise Dufort – drums; Gil Weston – bass, backing and lead vocals	Screaming Blue Murder (1982); 1-2-3-4 Rock and Roll (EP; 1983); Play Dirty (1983); King Biscuit Flower Hour Presents Girlschool (1997); Race with the Devil (2002)
1984–1985	Kim McAuliffe – rhythm guitar, backing and lead vocals; Denise Dufort – drums; Gil Weston – bass, backing vocals; Cris Bonacci – lead guitar, backing vocals; Jackie Bodimead – lead and backing vocals, keyboards	Running Wild (1985)
1986–1987	Kim McAuliffe – rhythm guitar, lead vocals; Denise Dufort – drums; Gil Weston – bass, backing vocals; Cris Bonacci – lead guitar, backing vocals	Nightmare at Maple Cross (1986)
1987–1988	Kim McAuliffe – rhythm guitar, lead vocals; Denise Dufort – drums; Cris Bonacci – lead guitar, backing vocals; Tracey Lamb – bass, backing vocals	Take a Bite (1988)
1990 (as She Devils)	Kim McAuliffe – rhythm guitar, vocals; Denise Dufort – drums; Cris Bonacci – lead guitar, backing vocals; Enid Williams – bass, vocals; Toyah Willcox – lead vocals	
1991 (as Strange Girls)	Kim McAuliffe – rhythm guitar, vocals; Cris Bonacci – lead guitar, backing vocals; Enid Williams – bass, vocals; Toyah Willcox – lead vocals; Lydie Gallais – drums	
1992	Kim McAuliffe – rhythm guitar, lead vocals; Cris Bonacci – lead guitar, backing vocals; Denise Dufort – drums; Jackie Carrera – bass, backing vocals	Girlschool (1992)
1993–1999	Kim McAuliffe – rhythm guitar, lead vocals; Denise Dufort – drums; Tracey Lamb – bass, backing vocals; Kelly Johnson – lead guitar, lead and backing vocals	Girlschool Live (1995); 21st Anniversary: Not That Innocent (2002)
2000–2019	Kim McAuliffe – rhythm guitar, lead and backing vocals; Denise Dufort – drums; Jackie Chambers – lead guitar, backing vocals; Enid Williams – bass, lead and backing vocals	21st Anniversary: Not That Innocent (2002); Believe (2004); Legacy (2008); Hit and Run – Revisited (2011); Guilty as Sin (2015)
2019–2024	Kim McAuliffe – rhythm guitar, lead and backing vocals; Denise Dufort – drums; Jackie Chambers – lead guitar, backing vocals; Tracey Lamb – bass, backing vocals	WTFortyfive? (2023)
2024–present	Kim McAuliffe – rhythm guitar, lead vocals; Denise Dufort – drums; Jackie Chambers – lead guitar, backing vocals; Olivia Airey – bass, backing vocals	none to date
