= The Sadista Sisters =

British music band

- Years active: 1974–1987
- Label: Transatlantic Records
- Website: sadistasisters.blogspot.com

The Sadista Sisters was a British music band that was active between 1974 and 1987. It was founded by Jude Alderson, Teresa D’Abreu and songwriter Jacky Tayler to perform political cabaret challenging society's treatment of women.

They released one self-titled LP (in 1976) for Transatlantic Records, and in their ever changing line-up had artists who would later join bands like Girlschool, The Slits, The Tourists and Au Pairs. The Eurythmics' David A. Stewart played guitar for them in 1977.

== Biography ==
The Sadista Sisters centred around co-founder Jude Alderson and songwriter Jacky Tayler. Co-founder Teresa D’Abreu left in 1977 as the band gained more of a punk image.

Among their productions were Duchess (1979) and Red Door Without a Bolt (1981), for which they received Arts Council funding. They played at Ronnie Scott's Jazz Club in London for five weeks in 1975.

They were originally an all female nine-piece group from all different backgrounds and cultures. However, after signing to Transatlantic Records, the record company didn't think the players were professional enough and brought in male replacements for their album. Although this upset the dynamic of the group, they went on to success and notoriety in Berlin in 1977 turning around the fortunes of the Treibhaus Club.

Other members included:

- Jacky Tayler (74–),
- Judith Alderson (74–),
- Linda Marlowe (74–),
- Teresa D'Abreu (74–77),
- Hazel Clyne (1975),
- John Knox (bass),
- David A. Stewart (gtr),
- Mo Foster (bass, Oct–Dec 75),
- Jim Toomey (drms, Oct–Dec 75),
- Bob Gill (gtr, Oct–Dec 75),
- Isaac Guillory (gtr, Oct–Dec 75),
- Barry Booth (keyb, Oct–Dec 75),
- Ritchie Gold (perc, Oct–Dec 75),
- Chris Mercer (sax, Oct–Dec 75),
- Henry Lowther (trump, Oct–Dec 75),
- Ron Carthy (trump, Oct–Dec 75),
- Barbara Splitz (gtr, 77–79),
- Susie Hendrix (gtr, Apr 78–),
- Linda Hall (voc),
- Marilyn Taylor (keyb),
- Lucy Finch (violin),
- Bernadette (bass),
- Angele (sax),
- Susie Webb (bass, Apr 78–),
- Denise Dufort (drms, Apr 78–),
- Jean Hart,
- Kate Phelps,
- Pauline Melville,
- Deirdre Cartwright,
- Wendy Herman,
- Debby Bishop (1979),
- Pete Dilemma (drms, Nov 78–79),
- Geoff Gurd (gtr),
- Chris Chesney (gtr/voc),
- Boris Bransby Williams (drms).

Background:

- Teresa D’Abreu was later in Babylon.
- Jude Alderson was ex-Kiss International and later Amazonia Music Theatre Company.
- Dave Stewart was ex-Longdancer, later in Catch.
- Susie Hendrix (Tinline) was ex-Flicks, later in Painted Lady.
- Wendy Herman was later in Angletrax.
- Deirdre Cartwright was ex-Painted Lady.
- Denise Dufort was ex-Flicks, later in Girlschool & Au Pairs.
- Susie (Gutsy) Webb was ex-Flicks, later in Slits, Au Pairs.
- Jim Toomey was later in The Tourists.
- Pete Dilemma was ex-Doctors Of Madness, and later in TV Smith's Explorers.

== Discography ==
- The Sadista Sisters (LP 1976) – Transatlantic Records
- Ragdoll Duchess/Foetus (single 1976) - Rhombus Productions Ltd (KD001)
