= Live & More =

Live & More may refer to:

- Live and More, a 1978 album by Donna Summer
  - Live & More Encore, a 1999 album by Donna Summer
- Live & More (Roberta Flack & Peabo Bryson album), released 1980
- Live & More EP, a 1981 Japanese-only release by XTC
- Live and More EP, a 1982 Japanese release by Girlschool
- Live & More (Marcus Miller album), released 1998
- Live and More!, a 2000 video by Britney Spears
