= The Second Wave: 25 Years of NWOBHM =

Compilation album by Oliver/Dawson Saxon, Girlschool and Tygers of Pan Tang
- Released: 4 November 2003
- Recorded: 2003
- Genre: Heavy metal
- Length: 65:49
- Label: Communiqué

Oliver/Dawson Saxon chronology
Re://Landed (2000)	The Second Wave: 25 Years of NWOBHM (2003)	It's Alive (2003)

Girlschool chronology
Race with the Devil (2002)	The Second Wave: 25 Years of NWOBHM (2003)	Believe (2004)

Tygers of Pan Tang chronology
Live in the Roar (2002)	The Second Wave: 25 Years of NWOBHM (2003)	Noises from the Cathouse (2004)

The Second Wave: 25 Years of NWOBHM is a split studio album released in 2003 by the British indie label Communiqué Records. The album contains five songs each from veteran bands of the new wave of British heavy metal Oliver/Dawson Saxon (resulting from a split of Saxon), Girlschool and Tygers of Pan Tang. The album features both new songs and already published ones, sometimes re-recorded for the occasion. The release of the album was supposed be followed by a UK tour of the three bands together, but Oliver/Dawson Saxon did not participate. The cover design was created by Robb Weir's nephew and Vectis radio DJ, Tim Pritchard with Paris-based designer Kev Baldwyn. The painting used for the cover was commissioned by Robb Weir and painted by Isle of Wight-based artist John Patty.

== Track listing ==
1. "World's Gone Crazy" (Oliver/Dawson Saxon) - 5:32
2. "Passion" (Girlschool) - 3:06
3. "Love Potion No. 9 2003" (Tygers of Pan Tang) - 3:01
4. "Nursery Crimes" (Oliver/Dawson Saxon) - 5:08
5. "Mad Mad Sister" (Girlschool) - 3:51
6. "Godspeak" (Tygers of Pan Tang) - 5:56
7. "Räder Aus Stahl" (Oliver/Dawson Saxon) - 4:23
8. "Coming Your Way" (Girlschool) - 3:24
9. "Mystical" (Tygers of Pan Tang) - 4:54
10. "Broken" (Oliver/Dawson Saxon) - 6:45
11. "Believe" (Girlschool) - 3:29
12. "Hellbound 2003" (Tygers of Pan Tang) - 3:23
13. "Ghost" (Oliver/Dawson Saxon) - 5:07
14. "Innocent" (Girlschool) - 3:08
15. "Firepower" (Tygers of Pan Tang) - 4:42

== Personnel ==
=== Oliver/Dawson Saxon ===
- John Ward - vocals
- Graham Oliver - guitar
- Haydn Conway - guitar
- Steve Dawson - bass
- Nigel Durham - drums

=== Girlschool ===
- Kim McAuliffe – vocals, guitar
- Jackie Chambers – lead guitar
- Enid Williams – vocals, bass
- Denise Dufort – drums

=== Tygers of Pan Tang ===
- Richie Wicks - vocals
- Robb Weir - guitar
- Dean "Deano" Robertson - guitar
- Brian West - bass
- Craig Ellis - drums
