= Guilty as Sin (album) =

Studio album by Girlschool
- Released: 13 November 2015
- Recorded: January – July 2015
- Studio: Ecology Room Studios, Kent, England
- Genre: Heavy metal
- Length: 40:43
- Label: UDR
- Producer: Chris Tsangarides

Girlschool chronology
Hit and Run - Revisited (2011)	Guilty as Sin (2015)	WTFortyfive? (2023)

Professional ratings
Review scores
Source	Rating
Blabbermouth.net	8/10
KNAC.FM	3.7/5
Loudwire	4/5 stars
Metal.de	4/10 stars
Metal Hammer (GER)	4/7 stars

Guilty as Sin is the thirteenth studio album by the British heavy metal band Girlschool, released on 13 November 2015. Guilty as Sin is the band's first album of original material since 2008's Legacy, after re-recording their 1981 album Hit and Run in 2011. It is the final release to feature original co-lead vocalist and bassist Enid Williams as Williams left the band in 2019.

== Track listing ==
Guilty as Sin track listing
No.	Title	Writer(s)	Length
1.	"Come the Revolution"	Enid Williams, Jackie Chambers	3:46
2.	"Take It Like a Band"	Chambers, Kim McAuliffe	2:47
3.	"Guilty as Sin"	McAuliffe, Chambers	3:41
4.	"Treasure"	Williams	3:51
5.	"Awkward Position"	McAuliffe, Chambers	3:39
6.	"Staying Alive" (Bee Gees cover)	Barry Gibb, Robin Gibb, Maurice Gibb	4:01
7.	"Perfect Storm"	Chambers, Williams	3:35
8.	"Painful"	Chambers, McAuliffe	3:45
9.	"Night Before"	McAuliffe, Chambers, Denise Dufort	3:08
10.	"Everybody Loves (Saturday Night)"	traditional	2:40
11.	"Coming Your Way"	Williams, Chambers, McAuliffe	3:25
12.	"Tonight"	Williams, McAuliffe, Kelly Johnson, Dufort	2:25

== Personnel ==
Band

- Kim McAuliffe – vocals, rhythm guitar, and backing vocals
- Jackie Chambers – lead guitar, backing vocals
- Enid Williams – bass guitar, vocals, and backing vocals
- Denise Dufort – drums

Production

- Chris Tsangarides – producer, engineer, mixing
- Tim Hamill – additional mixing, mastering
- Jack Joseph – photography
- Sing Lo – photography
- Karl – photography
- Zak Wilson – cover art, design
