= Cris Bonacci =

- Born: Cristina Bonacci; 15 October 1964 (age 61); Myrtleford, Victoria, Australia
- Genres: Heavy metal, hard rock, pop, dance
- Occupations: Musician, songwriter, record producer
- Instruments: Guitar, keyboards, vocals
- Years active: 1977–present
- Label: Renaissance

Cristina "Cris" Bonacci (born 15 October 1964) is an Australian-born producer, songwriter, and musician. She was the lead guitarist in the British heavy metal band Girlschool (1984 to 1992, 2004) and has also provided session guitar work for other artists.

== Career ==
Bonacci was born at Myrtleford, in northeastern Victoria and grew up on a country farm near Melbourne where her family had moved when she was 11 or 12 years old. She started playing guitar soon after coming to Melbourne, inspired by her father's guitar playing, her uncle's band membership, and her Spanish neighbors' flamenco guitar. Bonacci was largely self-taught and influenced by rock guitarists Jimi Hendrix and Jeff Beck, as well as early Black Sabbath albums.

She played in several Australian bands but never stayed with one for more than a few years. In the early 1970s, she joined the rock group, Vixen, as lead guitarist. In early 1975, Bonacci and Sally Zylstra formed Sweet Jayne in Melbourne with Robyn Clark on drums and Zylstra on bass guitar. They later added lead singer Chris Scheri, who also played the flute. Sweet Jayne developed a large local following and recorded several demos and an EP between 1977 and 1983.

Their self-titled EP was issued in January 1980 and had five tracks, "Ambiguous Girl", "Omniscience", "Some People", "State of Mind" and "Crushed and Crazy". Australian musicologist, Ian McFarlane, opined that it, "highlighted Bonacci's crunching guitar riffs offset by Scheri's melodic vocals and lilting flute lines." Soon after Brendan O'Shea replaced Zylstra on bass guitar and John Zaffarese replaced Clark on drums. In October 1981, this lineup issued a single, "Icarus", with Fab Versace replacing Zaffarese on drums before being replaced in turn by Billy George in 1982. The group disbanded in January 1983.

Following the dissolution of Sweet Jayne, Bonacci moved to the United Kingdom to work as a session musician after being invited by Mike Oldfield. In London, Bonacci joined the all-female hard rock outfit, She, as lead guitarist. She included lead vocalist Jackie "Jacqui" Bodimead and former Rock Goddess bassist Tracey Lamb, whom Bonacci would later team up with in Girlschool. Bonacci and Bodimead were invited to join Girlschool following lead guitarist Kelly Johnson's departure. During her time with Girlschool, Bonacci recorded the albums Running Wild, Nightmare at Maple Cross, Take a Bite and Girlschool, touring extensively all over the world.

In a period of inactivity for Girlschool in 1990, Bonacci joined up with British rock singer Toyah Willcox, performing on GMTV to promote Willcox's album Ophelia's Shadow. In the years 1991 and 1992, Bonacci and Willcox (and Bonacci's bandmates in Girlschool Enid Williams and Kim McAuliffe) formed the short-lived band She Devils, which made two short tours around Europe. After the She Devils project, Bonacci finally left Girlschool and joined Marc Almond's touring band. In December 2004, Bonacci re-joined Girlschool for a one-off gig at the London Garage alongside original guitarist Kelly Johnson and current guitarist Jackie Chambers. She also played at the tribute gig for Kelly Johnson on 20 August 2007, in London. After leaving Girlschool, she worked as a session guitarist and became a member of Jonathan Ross' house band for the British TV show Saturday Zoo, where she backed international artists such as Suzanne Vega, and k.d. lang.

Bonacci wrote lyrics, and music and produced for a variety of artists. She wrote mostly for the bands of which she was a member, but she has also written for and produced other artists, such as All Saints and Samantha Fox. In 2003, Bonacci wrote and produced the song "Look Up" which was released on the dance compilation CD Fashion Lounge: Id Models, published in the United States by Water Music Records. She also co-produced and engineered Dawne Adams' album Assume Nothing in 2004. She is currently affiliated with Electracult, a band she formed with Michelle Mullen in January 2005. Electracult released their first full-length release Electracult Me on 15 April 2008, on Renaissance Records. Since 2000, much of her focus has been on software training. In June 2015, Bonacci was interviewed extensively about her musical career on the Australian Rock Show podcast.

== Discography ==
With Sweet Jayne

- Some People (7" self-produced EP; 1979)
- State of Mind (7" self-produced EP; 1979)
- Crushed and Crazy (7" self-produced EP; 1979)
- "Icarus" (7" single; 1981)

With Girlschool

- Running Wild (1985)
- Nightmare at Maple Cross (1986)
- Take a Bite (1988)
- Girlschool (1992)

With Mark Shreeve

- Legion (1985)

With Marc Almond

- Twelve Years of Tears (1993)
- "What Makes a Man a Man" (1993)

With Samantha Fox

- 21st Century Fox (1998)

With All Saints

- Saints & Sinners (2000)

With Electracult

- Electracult EP (2005)
- Electracult Me (2008)

=== As producer ===
- 21st Century Fox (1998)
- Fashion Lounge: Id Models (2003)
- Assume Nothing (2004)
- Electracult Me (2008)

== DVD releases ==
- Play Dirty Live (1984)
- Twelve Years of Tears – Live at the Royal Albert Hall 1992 (2007)
