= The Collection (Girlschool album) =

Compilation album by Girlschool
- Released: 19 October 1998
- Genre: Heavy metal
- Length: 153:33
- Label: Renaissance / Castle

Girlschool chronology
Race with the Devil Live (1998)	The Collection (1998)	21st Anniversary: Not That Innocent (2002)

Professional ratings
Review scores
Source	Rating
AllMusic	4/5 stars
Collector's Guide to Heavy Metal	7/10

The Collection is a double CD compilation album of the all-female British heavy metal band Girlschool. The album was released in 1998 by Renaissance Records, under licence from Castle Communications, and reissued in 2000 by Sanctuary Records, of which Castle had become a subsidiary. Castle was the owner of Girlschool back catalogue, acquired from Bronze and GWR.

The compilation contains five previously unreleased live tracks. All the tracks of the album were re-mastered by Robert M. Corich and Mike Brown in August 1998. The first CD contains all the singles released by Girlschool since 1983 with their b-sides, including the duet with Motörhead on the song "Please Don't Touch", originally released on the EP St. Valentine's Day Massacre. The second CD contains more singles and b-sides, some album songs, the unreleased tracks and the covers of Mud's "Tiger Feet" and of Sweet's "Fox on the Run".

== Track listing ==
CD 1
No.	Title	Length
1.	"Take It All Away" (Single Version)	3:13
2.	"It Could Be Better"	2:55
3.	"Emergency"	2:50
4.	"Furniture Fire"	3:01
5.	"Nothing to Lose"	3:14
6.	"Baby Doll"	4:14
7.	"Race with the Devil"	2:52
8.	"Take It All Away"	3:45
9.	"Yeah Right"	3:21
10.	"The Hunter"	3:16
11.	"Please Don't Touch" (Headgirl)	2:48
12.	"Emergency" (Motörhead feat. Denise Dufort)	2:59
13.	"Bomber"	3:36
14.	"Hit and Run"	3:04
15.	"Tonight"	2:34
16.	"C'mon Let's Go"	3:35
17.	"Tonight" (live)	2:33
18.	"Demolition Boys" (live)	3:38
19.	"Don't Call It Love"	3:23
20.	"Wildlife" (An edit, as the original EP version is 2:19. No reason is given for this.)	1:15
21.	"Don't Stop" (An edit, as the original EP version is 2:44. No reason is given for this.)	1:22
22.	"1-2-3-4 Rock 'n' Roll" (12" version)	4:32
23.	"Tush"	2:13
24.	"20th Century Boy"	3:29
25.	"Breaking the Rules"	3:02

CD 2
No.	Title	Length
1.	"I'm the Leader of the Gang (I Am)" (feat. Gary Glitter)	3:53
2.	"Burning in the Heat"	3:20
3.	"Surrender"	3:24
4.	"Never Too Late"	3:22
5.	"Demolition Boys"	3:41
6.	"Kick It Down"	3:04
7.	"Screaming Blue Murder"	3:22
8.	"Flesh and Blood"	2:17
9.	"Play Dirty"	5:05
10.	"I Like It Like That"	3:27
11.	"Play with Fire"	2:41
12.	"Tiger Feet"	4:33
13.	"Fox on the Run"	3:53
14.	"Head over Heels"	3:33
15.	"This Time"	3:22
16.	"Too Hot to Handle"	3:50
17.	"All Day All Night"	3:08
18.	"Up All Night" (live)	3:11
19.	"Action" (live)	3:22
20.	"Future Flash" (live)	3:40
21.	"Back for More" (live)	3:08
22.	"Yeah Right!" (live)	3:33
