= Hit and Run – Revisited =

Studio album by Girlschool
- Released: 26 September 2011
- Studio: Sonic One Studio, Llangennech, Wales
- Genre: Heavy metal
- Length: 43:24
- Label: Wacken Records / UDR
- Producer: Tim Hamill and Girlschool

Girlschool chronology
Legacy (2008)	Hit and Run – Revisited (2011)	Guilty as Sin (2015)

Professional ratings
Review scores
Source	Rating
About.com	4/5 stars

Hit and Run – Revisited is the twelfth studio album by the British heavy metal band Girlschool, released in 2011. The album is a re-recording of the 1981 album Hit and Run, considered by most critics a classic of the new wave of British heavy metal period and the most commercially successful for Girlschool. The new album celebrates the 30th anniversary of the release of Hit and Run and includes as bonus track a re-recording of "Demolition Boys" and a duet with the German metal singer Doro on a new version of the title track.

The album cover features art by the English commercial artist, Adrian Chesterman who was also responsible for creating cover art for, amongst others, Motörhead's 1979 Bomber album.

== Track listing ==
No.	Title	Writer(s)	Length
1.	"C'mon Let's Go"	Kim McAuliffe, Kelly Johnson	3:45
2.	"The Hunter"	McAuliffe, Johnson	3:16
3.	"(I'm Your) Victim"	McAuliffe, Denise Dufort	2:50
4.	"Kick It Down"	McAuliffe, Johnson	3:05
5.	"Following the Crowd"	Enid Williams, McAuliffe, Johnson	3:08
6.	"Tush" (ZZ Top cover)	Billy Gibbons, Dusty Hill, Frank Beard	2:24
7.	"Hit and Run"	McAuliffe, Johnson	3:05
8.	"Watch Your Step"	Williams, McAuliffe, Johnson	3:20
9.	"Back to Start"	Johnson, Willams	3:36
10.	"Yeah Right"	McAuliffe, Johnson, Dufort	3:16
11.	"Future Flash"	Johnson, McAuliffe	4:51

Bonus tracks
No.	Title	Writer(s)	Length
12.	"Demolition Boys"	McAuliffe, Johnson	3:43
13.	"Hit and Run" (ft. Doro)		3:05

== Personnel ==
=== Band members ===
- Kim McAuliffe – lead and backing vocals, rhythm guitar
- Jackie Chambers – lead guitar, backing vocals
- Enid Williams – lead and backing vocals, bass
- Denise Dufort – drums

=== Additional musicians ===
- Doro Pesch – lead vocals on track 13

=== Production ===
- Tim Hamill – producer, engineer, mixing
