= Oliver/Dawson Saxon =

English heavy metal band

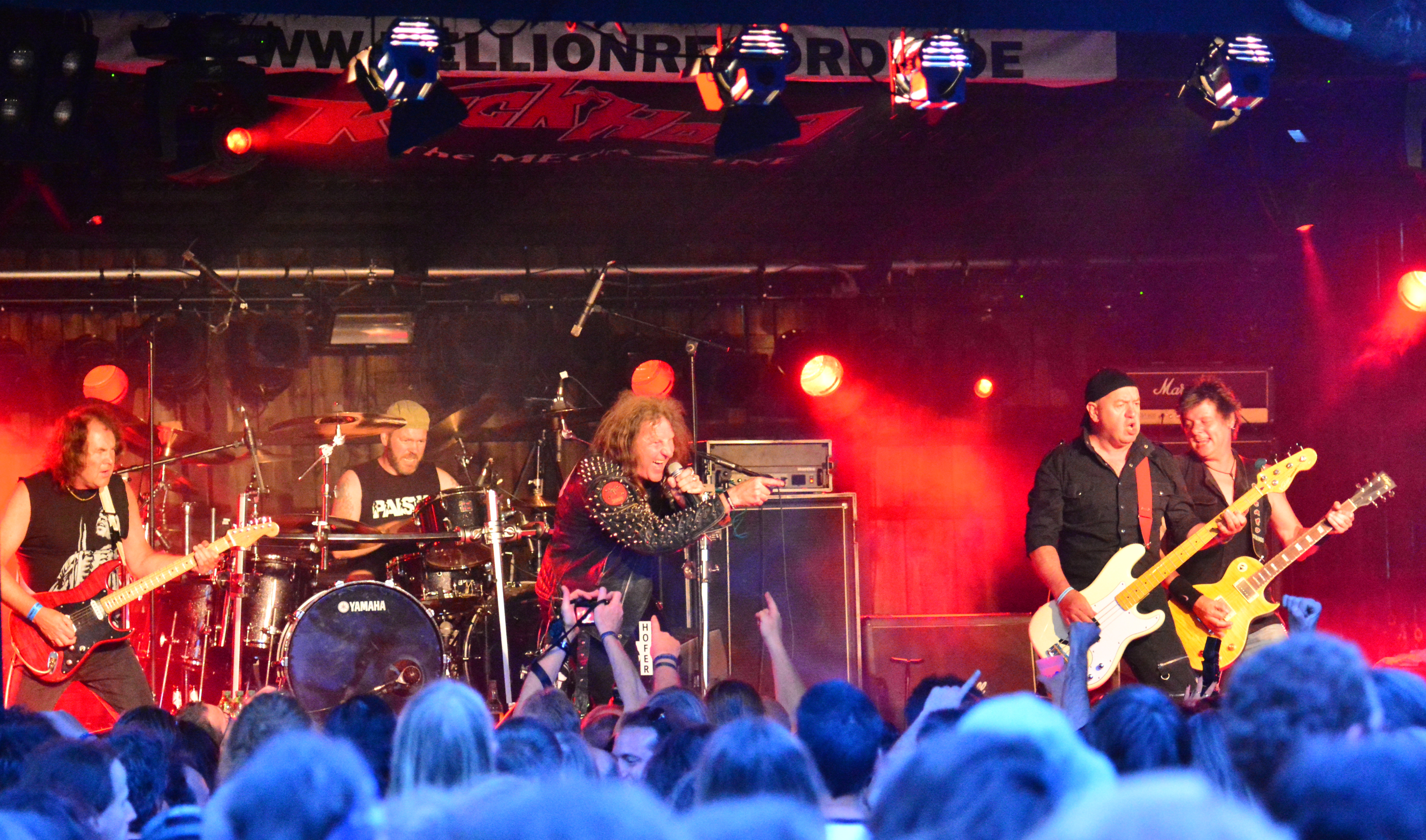
- Oliver/Dawson Saxon at Headbangers Open Air 2014

Background information
- Origin: Barnsley, England
- Genres: Heavy metal
- Years active: 1995–2021
- Past members: Bri Shaughnessy; Graham Oliver; Gav Coulson; Steve Dawson; Paul Oliver
- Website: http://www.odsrock.co.uk/

Oliver/Dawson Saxon was an English heavy metal band formed in 1995 by former members of Saxon, guitarist Graham Oliver and bassist Steve Dawson.

Following Steve Dawson's decision to retire from performing in October 2021, Graham Oliver, Gav Coulson and Bri Shaughnessy recruited new bandmembers and chose to continue working together under the new name of 'Graham Oliver's Army'.

== Biography ==
=== Oliver/Dawson Saxon (1994–2021) ===
In 1994, Graham Oliver and Steve Dawson, founding members of Saxon, reunited under the name Son of a Bitch (which had been Saxon's own name originally, before they became well known) and released Victim You. They performed under various names such as "SAXON-Son of a Bitch tour" and "SAXON-the early years", before deciding on their current name "Oliver/Dawson Saxon" in 2000. The band has been known by this name ever since, and despite recording other material from 1996 onwards have always relied primarily on Saxon songs during live sets. An attempt to perform under the name "SAXON" alone was prevented by Peter "Biff" Byford, another member of the original band, threatening legal action. In 1997, Oliver and Dawson registered "SAXON" as a trademark, and attempted, through their management company, to prevent Byford's band using the name on their promotional material. Byford opposed this registration, but initially the UK Patent Office held that the registration was valid, as Oliver and Dawson (as original members of "Son of a Bitch" in 1978) had equal rights to Byford in the name "SAXON". However, the High Court overturned the registration, ruling that it had been applied for in bad faith. Oliver and Dawson were thereby prevented from describing themselves as "Saxon" and obliged to prominently include the "Oliver/Dawson" element of the name in their advertising material. The name "Saxon" had been given to the band by then Freddy Cannon, managing director of Carrere Records UK, because retail outlets refused to carry "Son of A Bitch" in 1978. In 2011, Brian Shaugnessey, frontman of rock group Seventh Son joined as the lead vocalist.

In 2016 Hadyn Conway stepped down as lead guitarist, and was replaced by Gavin Coulson.

In 2021, bassist and founder member Steve Dawson chose to retire from touring and recording, which brought the band to a close.

== Final line-up ==
- Graham Oliver – guitar (Saxon: 1976–1994, Oliver/Dawson Saxon: 1994–2021)
- Steve Dawson – bass guitar (Saxon: 1976–1986, Oliver/Dawson Saxon: 1994–2021)
- Paul Oliver – drums (Oliver/Dawson Saxon: 2010–2021)
- Bri Shaughnessy – vocals (Oliver/Dawson Saxon: 2011–2021)
- Gav Coulson – guitar (Oliver/Dawson Saxon: 2016–2021)

== Past members ==
=== Son of a Bitch (1994–1999) ===
- Ted Bullet – vocals
- Graham Oliver – guitar
- Haydn Conway – guitar
- Steve Dawson – bass
- Pete Gill – drums

=== Son of a Bitch (1999) ===
- Kev Moore – vocals
- Graham Oliver – guitar
- Haydn Conway – guitar
- Steve Dawson – bass
- Nigel Durham – drums

=== Oliver/Dawson Saxon (2000 – Nov 2010) ===
- John Ward – vocals
- Graham Oliver – guitar
- Haydn Conway – guitar
- Steve Dawson – bass
- Nigel Durham – drums

=== Oliver/Dawson Saxon (Nov 2010–2011) ===
- John Ward – vocals
- Graham Oliver – guitar
- Haydn Conway – guitar
- Steve Dawson – bass
- Paul Oliver – drums

=== Oliver/Dawson Saxon (2011–2016) ===
- Bri Shaughnessy – vocals
- Graham Oliver – guitar
- Haydn Conway – guitar
- Steve Dawson – bass
- Paul Oliver – drums

=== Oliver/Dawson Saxon (2016–2021) ===
- Bri Shaughnessy – vocals
- Graham Oliver – guitar
- Gav Coulson – guitar
- Steve Dawson – bass guitar
- Paul Oliver – drums

== Discography ==
- Victim You (as Son of a Bitch) (1996)
- Re://Landed (Live) (2000)
- Rock Has Landed It's Alive (DVD) (2002)
- The Second Wave: 25 Years of NWOBHM (with Girlschool and Tygers of Pan Tang) (2003)
- It's Alive (Live) (2003)
- Motorbiker (2012)
- Blood And Thunder – Live (2014)
