= Play Dirty Live =

- Cover of the original VHS

Video by Girlschool
- Released: 1985
- Recorded: 7 December 1984
- Venue: Camden Palace Theatre, London
- Genre: Heavy metal
- Length: 57:03 (VHS), 59:00 (DVD)
- Label: (United States) PolyGram (United Kingdom) Castle Communications
- Director: Marc Over
- Producer: Madeleine French, Heather Staines

Girlschool chronology
Play Dirty Live (1985)	Live from London (2005)

UK edition cover

DVD 2005 edition cover

Play Dirty Live is the first video album released by the British heavy metal band Girlschool in 1985. The American release of the VHS was done by Polygram, the label that had Girlschool under contract at the time. The release of the video was part of the marketing strategy to launch the studio album Running Wild in the US, the only country where it was published. The British edition was instead licensed to Castle Communications and released at the same time. The concert was filmed by Trillion Pictures at the Camden Palace Theatre in London on 7 December 1984 for the British TV show Live from London. The band, which had been recently augmented to a five-piece group, was still recording Running Wild and presents in this show five new songs from the upcoming album. The following songs have their titles wrongly indicated on the sleeve of the VHS: "Out to Get You" (Future Flash), "Ready to Rock" (Are You Ready?), "Emergency 999" (Emergency). The song "I Like It Like That" is the B-side of the "20th Century Boy" 12 inches single.

The footage of the concert was re-released in DVD in 2005 with the title Live from London by the British label Iguana Project, specialized in new editions on DVD of old material. The DVD has the same content of the VHS, with the addition of a presentation of the musicians. An Australian edition of the DVD was released in 2006.

== Track listing ==
1. "C'mon Let's Go"
2. "Nowhere to Run"
3. "You Got Me"
4. "Play Dirty"
5. "Love Is a Lie"
6. "Hit and Run"
7. "Out to Get You"
8. "Rock Me Shock Me"
9. "Running for Cover"
10. "Can't You See"
11. "Running Wild"
12. "I Like It Like That"
13. "Ready to Rock"
14. "Emergency 999"

== Personnel ==
=== Band members ===
- Jackie Bodimead – lead vocals, keyboards
- Kim McAulliffe – lead vocals, guitar
- Cris Bonacci – guitar, backing vocals
- Gil Weston-Jones – bass, backing vocals
- Denise Dufort – drums

=== Production ===
- Marc Over – director
- Madeleine French, Heather Staines – producers
- Phillip Goodhand-Tait, Len Epand – executive producers
