= 21st Anniversary: Not That Innocent =

Studio album by Girlschool
- Released: 14 January 2002
- Genre: Heavy metal
- Length: 42:55
- Label: Communiqué
- Producer: Tim Hamill & Girlschool

Girlschool chronology
The Collection (1998)	21st Anniversary: Not That Innocent (2002)	Believe (2004)

Professional ratings
Review scores
Source	Rating
AllMusic	3.5/5 stars

21st Anniversary: Not That Innocent is the ninth studio album by British heavy metal band, Girlschool, released on Communiqué Records in 2002. The production of the album lasted for a prolonged time and it was finally released when lead guitarist Kelly Johnson and bassist Tracey Lamb had already left the band. They were replaced by new lead guitarist Jackie Chambers and by the original bass player Enid Williams, who play in two new songs included in this album.

== Track listing ==
All tracks are written by Kim McAuliffe and Kelly Johnson, except where noted

No.	Title	Writer(s)	Length
1.	"Coming Your Way"	Enid Williams, Jackie Chambers, Kim McAuliffe	3:24
2.	"Mad Mad Sister"		3:53
3.	"A Love Too Far"	Johnson	3:48
4.	"Stay Wild"		3:19
5.	"Knife"		3:38
6.	"London"		2:41
7.	"I Told You So"	McAuliffe, Johnson, Denise Dufort	2:35
8.	"Have a Nice Day"		3:28
9.	"Born to Be"		3:34
10.	"Hooked"	McAuliffe, Johnson, Tracey Lamb, Dufort	2:55
11.	"Little Green Men"		3:16
12.	"Innocent"	McAuliffe, Chambers, Williams, Dufort	3:10
13.	"Everybody Does It"		3:50

== Credits ==
- Kim McAuliffe – lead vocals on tracks 2, 6, 9, 10, 11, 12, rhythm guitar, backing vocals
- Kelly Johnson – lead vocals on tracks 3, 4, 5, 7, 8, 13, lead guitar on tracks 2–11, 13
- Jackie Chambers – lead guitar on tracks 1 and 12
- Tracey Lamb – bass on tracks 2–11, backing vocals
- Enid Williams – lead vocals on track 1, bass on tracks 1 and 12
- Denise Dufort – drums
- Tim Hamill – bass on track 13, producer and engineer
