= Race with the Devil Live =

Live album by Girlschool
- Released: 24 April 1998
- Recorded: 21 January 1982
- Venue: Shibuya Public Hall, Tokyo, Japan
- Genre: Heavy metal
- Length: 58:10
- Label: Receiver Records

Girlschool chronology
King Biscuit Flower Hour Presents Girlschool (1997)	Race with the Devil Live (1998)	The Collection (1998)

Race with the Devil Live (Receiver Records RRCD 254) is the third live album by British heavy metal band, Girlschool, released in 1998. It is the recording of a concert held in Tokyo, during the 1982 Japanese tour. Enid Williams would leave the band soon thereafter.

The album was released again in 2008 with a different cover by Phantom Records.

== Track listing ==
No.	Title	Length
1.	"C'mon Let's Go"	4:37
2.	"The Hunter"	3:31
3.	"(I'm Your) Victim"	3:00
4.	"Midnight Ride"	3:25
5.	"Race with the Devil"	3:01
6.	"Kick It Down"	3:17
7.	"Don't Call It Love"	3:52
8.	"Don't Stop"	3:07
9.	"Breakdown"	2:59
10.	"Nothing to Lose"	6:47
11.	"Watch Your Step"	4:03
12.	"Future Flash"	4:34
13.	"Yeah Right"	3:19
14.	"Hit and Run"	3:18
15.	"Tonight"	2:41
16.	"Tush"	2:39

== Credits ==
- Kim McAuliffe – rhythm guitar, vocals
- Kelly Johnson – lead guitar, vocals
- Enid Williams – bass, vocals
- Denise Dufort – drums
