= Take a Bite =

Studio album by Girlschool
- Released: 3 October 1988
- Studios: Redwood Studios, London
- Genre: Heavy metal
- Length: 36:38
- Label: GWR
- Producer: André Jacquemin

Girlschool chronology
Nightmare at Maple Cross (1986)	Take a Bite (1988)	Girlschool (1992)

Singles from Take a Bite
- 1. "Head over Heels" Released: 1989; 2. "Fox on the Run" Released: 1989

Professional ratings
Review scores
Source	Rating
AllMusic	4.5/5 stars

Take a Bite is the seventh studio album by British heavy metal band, Girlschool, released by GWR Records in 1988. It is the first album to feature Tracey Lamb on bass, replacing Gil Weston-Jones.

== Overview ==
Take a Bite was recorded at a very low time for Girlschool because, despite the very good reviews for the previous album Nightmare at Maple Cross, they had not succeeded in regaining the fan base support in the UK which they had in the early 80s and they could not improve the sales of their album worldwide for the lack of a US release. The band had hoped to record the new album with their long-time producer Vic Maile, who was not available because of his illness. The album was instead produced by Monty Python's collaborator André Jacquemin at Redwood Studios, which are co-owned by Jacquemin and actor Michael Palin, member of the British comedy group Monty Python. The same studios had been utilised by Motörhead to record their album Rock 'n' Roll the year before. The recording and mixing sessions took a very long time because, to save money, they were scheduled on 'dead time' in the middle of the night, when the studio was empty. On the contrary, the artwork, photos and packaging are the result of a rushed work done in less than a week. "We got to the situation where we needed photographs of the band and all we had were these snaps taken by the fans" remarked guitarist Cris Bonacci in an interview to Kerrang! magazine about the unsatisfying results of the album packaging.

The very good reviews and their UK tour with Gary Glitter did not help the album to chart at home and after an American and European tour GWR did not renew their contract. By the end of 1989, Girlschool had practically disbanded.

The song "Head over Heels" contains a text written by Motörhead bassist Lemmy on a napkin, during a night out in a pub with McAuliffe and other friends. The album contains also the cover of Sweet's single "Fox on the Run", taken from the album Desolation Boulevard of 1974. Enigma Records, which produced the album in America, released two promo singles for the songs "Head over Heels" and "Fox on the Run" to be distributed to radio stations in the USA. Roadrunner Records marketed the album in Europe.

== Track listing ==
Side one
No.	Title	Writer(s)	Length
1.	"Action"	Kim McAuliffe, Cris Bonacci, Denise Dufort, Tracey Lamb	3:04
2.	"Fox on the Run" (The Sweet cover)	Brian Connolly, Steve Priest, Mick Tucker, Andy Scott	3:54
3.	"Girls on Top"	McAuliffe, Bonacci	3:50
4.	"Tear it Up"	McAuliffe, Bonacci, Dufort, Lamb	3:53
5.	"Love at First Bite"	McAuliffe, Bonacci	3:49

Side two
No.	Title	Writer(s)	Length
6.	"Head over Heels"	Ian Kilmister, McAuliffe, Bonacci	3:35
7.	"Up All Night"	McAuliffe, Bonacci	3:14
8.	"This Time"	McAuliffe, Bonacci, Dufort, Lamb	3:23
9.	"Don't Walk Away"	McAuliffe, Bonacci, Dufort, Lamb	4:05
10.	"Too Hot to Handle"	McAuliffe, Bonacci	3:51

== Personnel ==
Band members

- Kim McAuliffe – vocals, rhythm guitar
- Cris Bonacci – lead guitar
- Tracey Lamb – bass
- Denise Dufort – drums

Additional musicians

- Merv Goldsworthy, Pete Jupp (FM) – backing vocals on "Girls on Top"
- Enid Williams – backing vocals on "This Time"

== Release history ==
Date	Region	Label	Catalogue	Format	Notes
3 October 1988	UK	GWR	GWLP21	vinyl	
1988	Sweden	Lyric Records	LRLP 5003	vinyl	
1988	Switzerland	Lyric Records	LRCD 5003	CD	
1988	Holland	GWR	RR 9513 1	vinyl	
1988	Canada	GWR/Enigma	7 75406-2	CD	
1989	Canada	GWR/Enigma	7 75406-1	vinyl	
1991	Japan	GWR	TECP-25645	CD	published in a double album compilation with Nightmare at Maple Cross
1992	France	Dojo/Castle	LOMA CD 8	CD	published in a double album compilation with Nightmare at Maple Cross
2006	UK	Castle/Sanctuary	CMRCD1382	CD	published in a double album compilation with Nightmare at Maple Cross
