= Girlschool (album) =

Studio album by Girlschool
- Released: November 1992
- Recorded: July–August 1992
- Studio: The Church Studios, London, UK
- Genre: Heavy metal
- Length: 39:06
- Label: Communiqué Records, Progressive International
- Producer: Girlschool

Girlschool chronology
Take a Bite (1988)	Girlschool (1992)	Girlschool Live (1995)

Girlschool is the eighth studio album by British heavy metal band, Girlschool, released on Communiqué Records and Progressive International in 1992. It is the fourth and last studio album recorded with lead guitarist Cris Bonacci and the only one with bassist Jackie Carrera. It is also the first Girlschool album to be self-produced for an independent British label.

Bonacci released this comment on the album title: "The album was going to be called No Bollocks! But in the end we decided to call it simply Girlschool because we realized we'd never used the name of the band as a title before".

== Track listing ==
No.	Title	Writer(s)	Length
1.	"My Ambition"	Kim McAuliffe, Cris Bonacci, Denise Dufort, Jackie Carrera	4:26
2.	"One More"	McAuliffe, Bonacci, Dufort, Carrera	3:11
3.	"Can't Say No"	McAuliffe	3:48
4.	"Wild at Heart"	McAuliffe, Bonacci	3:48
5.	"Can't Do That"	McAuliffe, Bonacci, Dufort, Carrera	4:30
6.	"We Came"	McAuliffe, Bonacci	3:48
7.	"Can't Keep a Good Girl Down"	McAuliffe, Bonacci	3:51
8.	"Sitting Pretty"	McAuliffe, Bonacci	3:59
9.	"On My Way"	McAuliffe, Bonacci, Carrera	4:19
10.	"Take Me I'm Yours"	McAuliffe	3:26

== Personnel ==
=== Band members ===
- Kim McAulliffe – lead and backing vocals, rhythm guitar
- Cris Bonacci – lead guitar
- Jackie Carrera – bass, backing vocals
- Denise Dufort – drums

=== Additional musicians ===
- Darren Allison – doholla drum (on "My Ambition")

=== Production ===
- Nick Addison – engineer
- Darren Allison – assistant engineer
