= Legacy (Girlschool album) =

Studio album by Girlschool
- Released: 24 October 2008 (Germany); 3 November 2008 (EU); 4 November 2008 (US)
- Studio: Sonic One Studios, Llangennech, Wales
- Genre: Heavy metal
- Length: 50:37
- Label: Wacken / SPV
- Producer: Tim Hamill & Girlschool

Girlschool chronology
Believe (2004)	Legacy (2008)	Hit and Run – Revisited (2011)

Professional ratings
Review scores
Source	Rating
AllMusic	4/5 stars
About.com	4/5 stars

Legacy is the eleventh studio album by British heavy metal band, Girlschool, released on Wacken Records in 2008. This album celebrates the 30th anniversary of Girlschool, making it the longest running all-female metal band in activity. A few musicians that the band befriended in the many years of incessant touring lent a hand in completing the recording. The song "Legend" is dedicated to Kelly Johnson, the former Girlschool guitarist who died in 2007.

== Track listing ==
No.	Title	Writer(s)	Length
1.	"Everything's the Same"	Kim McAuliffe	3:14
2.	"From the Other Side"	Jackie Chambers, McAuliffe	3:35
3.	"I Spy" (Girlschool Mix)	Chambers, Enid Williams, McAuliffe	3:47
4.	"Spend Spend Spend"	Williams	3:33
5.	"Whole New World"	Chambers, Williams	3:40
6.	"Just Another Day"	Chambers, Denise Dufort	3:48
7.	"Legend"	Chambers	3:44
8.	"Still Waters"	Williams	3:03
9.	"Metropolis" (Motörhead cover)	Ian Kilmister, Eddie Clarke, Phil Taylor	3:17
10.	"Don't Mess Around"	Chambers, McAuliffe	2:34
11.	"Zeitgeist"	Williams	4:15
12.	"Don't Talk to Me"	Chambers, Dufort, Kilmister, McAuliffe	2:25
13.	"I Spy" (Dio/Iommi Mix)	Chambers, Williams, McAuliffe	4:09
14.	"Emergency"	Williams, Kelly Johnson, McAuliffe, Dufort	2:50
15.	"London"	McAuliffe, Johnson	2:43

== Personnel ==
Girlschool

- Kim McAuliffe – lead and backing vocals, rhythm guitar
- Jackie Chambers – lead guitar, backing vocals
- Enid Williams – lead and backing vocals, bass
- Denise Dufort – drums
- Kelly Johnson – "ghost" appearance

Guest musicians

- Eddie Ojeda – lead guitar and solo on "Spend Spend Spend"
- Neil Murray – bass on "Whole New World" and "Legend"
- Phil Campbell – guitar solo on "Whole New World", guitar solo on "Just Another Day", guitar on "Zeitgeist"
- "Fast" Eddie Clarke – guitar solo on "Metropolis"
- J.J. French – guitar solo on "Don't Mess Around"
- Lemmy Kilmister – bass, vocals and triangle on "Don't Talk To Me"
- Ronnie James Dio – vocals on "I Spy (Dio/Iommi Mix)"
- Tony Iommi – lead guitar on "I Spy (Dio/Iommi Mix)"

Production

- Tim Hamill – producer, engineer
- Rudy Sarzo – engineer for Ronnie James Dio
