= Girlschool Live =

Live album by Girlschool
- Released: 1 November 1995
- Recorded: 22 March 1995
- Venues: Phoenix Plaza, Wokingham, UK
- Genre: Heavy metal
- Length: 49:11
- Label: Communiqué Records
- Producer: Girlschool

Girlschool chronology
Girlschool (1992)	Girlschool Live (1995)	King Biscuit Flower Hour Presents Girlschool (1997)

Girlschool Live was the first official live album by British heavy metal band, Girlschool, released on Communiqué Records in 1995. It again features Kelly Johnson on lead guitar.

== Track listing ==
No.	Title	Length
1.	"Screaming Blue Murder"	3:29
2.	"Hit & Run"	2:56
3.	"We Came"	3:42
4.	"Action"	3:22
5.	"Future Flash"	4:16
6.	"On My Way"	3:42
7.	"Knife"	3:34
8.	"Not for Sale"	3:26
9.	"Little Green Men"	3:26
10.	"Kick It Down"	2:41
11.	"Demolition Boys"	3:09
12.	"C'mon Let's Go"	3:38
13.	"Emergency"	3:39
14.	"Take It All Away"	4:11

== Credits ==
- Kim McAulliffe – vocals, guitar
- Kelly Johnson – vocals, guitar
- Tracey Lamb – bass
- Denise Dufort – drums
