= Deirdre Cartwright =

British musician (born 1958)

- Born: 27 July 1958 (age 66)
- Genres: Jazz
- Occupation(s): Musician and composer
- Instrument: Guitar
- Website: www.deirdrecartwright.com

Deirdre Cartwright (born 27 July 1958) is a British guitarist and composer.

Cartwright was a member of Painted Lady, which later became known as Girlschool; she left to form another band, Tour De Force.

In 1983, Cartwright provided the guitar tuition element of the BBC/PBS series Rockschool alongside bass guitarist Henry Thomas and drummer Geoff Nicholls. In 1989, along with Alison Rayner, Cartwright started a regular monthly night at the Vortex Jazz Club called Blow The Fuse. She was a member of the popular Guest Stars sextet which toured widely in the UK and abroad during the 1980s. She is currently a member of the Alison Rayner Quintet, and leads her own trio Organik.

== Discography ==
With ARQ (Alison Rayner Quintet)

- Short Stories (2019)
- A Magic Life (2016)
- August (2014)

As leader

- Emily Remembered (2011)
- Tune Up Turn On Stretch Out (2008)
- Dr Quantum Leaps (2005)
- Precious Things (2002)
- Play (1996)
- Debut (1994)

With The Guest Stars

- The Guest Stars - compilation (2006)
- Live in Berlin (1987)
- Out at Night (1985)
- The Guest Stars (1984)

With Tour de Force

- Nightbeat (1980) EMI Records
- School Rules (1981)
- Beat the Clock (1982)
