= Demolition (Girlschool album) =

Studio album by Girlschool
- Released: 30 June 1980
- Recorded: April–May 1980
- Studio: Jackson's Studios, Rickmansworth, England
- Genre: Heavy metal
- Length: 34:32
- Label: Bronze
- Producer: Vic Maile

Girlschool chronology
Demolition (1980)	St. Valentine's Day Massacre (1981)

Singles from Demolition
- 1. "Emergency / Furniture Fire" Released: January 1980; 2. "Nothing to Lose / Baby Doll" Released: May 1980; 3. "Race with the Devil / Take It All Away" Released: July 1980

Professional ratings
Review scores
Source	Rating
AllMusic	4/5 stars
Collector's Guide to Heavy Metal	6/10
Classic Rock	3.5/5 stars

Demolition is the first studio album by the British heavy metal band Girlschool. It was released in Europe on Bronze Records in 1980.

It was produced by experienced sound engineer Vic Maile. Demolition reached No. 28 in the UK Albums Chart, following the rising of the new wave of British heavy metal phenomenon. The tour supporting the album included high-profile support slots at Black Sabbath and Uriah Heep shows.

"Race with the Devil" is a cover of the song originally performed by the British rock band The Gun. The song has also been covered by Judas Priest.

The 2004 CD edition issued by Castle, a subsidiary of Sanctuary Records, contains bonus tracks and extensive sleevenotes by Record Collector's Joe Geesin.

== Track listings ==
Side one
No.	Title	Writer(s)	Length
1.	"Demolition Boys"	Kim McAuliffe, Kelly Johnson	3:39
2.	"Not for Sale"	Girlschool	3:31
3.	"Race with the Devil" (The Gun cover)	Adrian Gurvitz	2:51
4.	"Take It All Away"	McAuliffe	3:43
5.	"Nothing to Lose"	McAuliffe, Johnson	4:30

Side two
No.	Title	Writer(s)	Length
6.	"Breakdown"	McAuliffe, Johnson	3:05
7.	"Midnight Ride"	McAuliffe, Johnson, Enid Williams	3:16
8.	"Emergency"	Girlschool	2:50
9.	"Baby Doll"	Girlschool	4:13
10.	"Deadline"	McAuliffe, Johnson	2:54

2004 remastered CD release bonus tracks
No.	Title	Length
11.	"Take It All Away" (single version)	3:12
12.	"It Could Be Better" (single version)	2:55
13.	"Nothing to Lose" (demo version)	3:47
14.	"Not for Sale" (demo version)	3:30
15.	"Furniture Fire" (B-side of "Emergency" single)	3:00
16.	"Take It All Away"	3:32
17.	"Breakdown"	3:24
18.	"Demolition Boys"	3:02
19.	"Nothing to Lose"	4:23

- Tracks 16–19 are a BBC radio session, broadcast on the Friday Rock Show on 1 August 1980. These tracks had not previously been commercially available.
- The album as such did not get a US release, but in 1982 Stiff Records released an album titled Hit and Run that was actually a compilation of Demolition and the band's second album, Hit and Run. The track-listing for this US-only release was "Hit and Run" / "Watch Your Step" / "Race with the Devil" / "Yeah Right" / "Not for Sale" / "Future Flash" / "C'mon Let's Go" / "The Hunter" / "Kick It Down" / "Take It All Away".

== Personnel ==
Band members

- Kim McAuliffe – rhythm guitar, vocals on tracks 1, 5, 10
- Kelly Johnson – lead guitar, vocals on tracks 6, 15
- Enid Williams – bass, vocals on tracks 2, 3, 4, 7, 8, 9, 11, 12
- Denise Dufort – drums

Production

- Vic Maile – producer, engineer, mixing

== Charts ==
Chart (1980)	Peak position
UK Albums (OCC)	28

== Release history ==
Date	Region	Label	Catalogue	Format	Notes
30 June 1980	UK	Bronze	BRON 525	vinyl	
1980	Germany	Bronze	202,426-320	vinyl	
1980	Italy	Bronze	BROL 34526	vinyl	
1980	Japan	Victor	VIP-6738	vinyl	
1991	UK	Dojo/Castle	LOMA CD1	CD	published in a double album compilation with Hit and Run
2004	Worldwide	Castle/Sanctuary	CMRCD949	CD	
