= Screaming Blue Murder (Girlschool album) =

Studio album by Girlschool
- Released: 7 June 1982
- Recorded: February–March 1982
- Studios: Surrey Sound Studio, Leatherhead, England
- Genre: Heavy metal
- Length: 31:07; 68:22 (re-issue)
- Labels: Bronze (UK); Mercury (U.S.)
- Producer: Nigel Gray

Girlschool chronology
Wildlife EP (1982)	Screaming Blue Murder (1982)	1-2-3-4 Rock and Roll (1983)

Singles from Screaming Blue Murder
- 1. "Don't Call it Love" Released: 1982

Professional ratings
Review scores
Source	Rating
AllMusic	3/5 stars
Collector's Guide to Heavy Metal	4/10

Screaming Blue Murder is the third studio album by British heavy metal band, Girlschool. It was released on Bronze Records in 1982, and featured one line-up change in bassist Ghislaine 'Gil' Weston, formerly of The Killjoys, replacing the recently departed founding member Enid Williams. Nigel Gray, who had previously worked with The Police, produced the album.

The original vinyl issue had the lyrics printed on the inner sleeve, although in the UK initial copies were accidentally shipped with a plain, generic liner. Rock magazine Kerrang! relayed, from Bronze Records, the advice to write to the label so that they could post the missing lyric sheet in return.

The UK-release was somewhat delayed, and the band had already started their 20-date UK tour, which ran through May 1982.

Castle Music issued what is considered the definitive edition of the CD 14 June 2004, adding eleven bonus tracks and extensive sleevenotes by Record Collector magazine's Joe Geesin. The album had previously been issued on a 2-on-1 CD in the UK, coupled with Play Dirty; that release (LOMA CD4) featured no bonus material.

== Track listing ==
Side one
No.	Title	Writer(s)	Length
1.	"Screaming Blue Murder"	Kelly Johnson, Kim McAuliffe, Gil Weston	3:34
2.	"Live with Me" (The Rolling Stones cover)	Mick Jagger, Keith Richards	3:20
3.	"Take It from Me"	McAuliffe, Johnson, Weston, Denise Dufort	2:51
4.	"Wildlife"	Johnson, McAuliffe, Enid Williams	2:48
5.	"Turns Your Head Around"	McAuliffe, Johnson	3:08

Side two
No.	Title	Writer(s)	Length
6.	"Don't Call It Love"	McAuliffe, Johnson	3:42
7.	"Hellrazor"	McAuliffe, Johnson, Weston, Dufort	2:38
8.	"When Your Blood Runs Cold"	Johnson, McAuliffe, Weston	3:23
9.	"You Got Me"	McAuliffe, Johnson	3:16
10.	"Flesh & Blood"	McAuliffe, Johnson, Weston, Dufort	2:27

2004 remastered CD release bonus tracks
No.	Title	Writer(s)	Length
11.	"Don't Stop" (B-side of the EP Wildlife, with Enid Williams on lead vocals)	McAuliffe, Johnson, Williams, Dufort	2:43
12.	"Screaming Blue Murder"		3:48
13.	"You Got Me"		3:45
14.	"When Your Blood Runs Cold"		4:08
15.	"Hit and Run"	McAuliffe, Johnson	3:04
16.	"Turns Your Head Around"		3:48
17.	"Wildlife"		2:46
18.	"Take It All Away"	McAuliffe	3:37
19.	"Emergency"	McAuliffe, Johnson, Williams, Dufort	3:44
20.	"C'mon Let's Go"	McAuliffe, Johnson	3:15
21.	"Tush" (ZZ Top cover)	Billy Gibbons, Dusty Hill, Frank Beard	2:37

- Tracks 12–21 are a BBC Radio 1 in Concert broadcast, recorded live in London on 9 June 1982. These tracks had previously not been made commercially available.

== Credits ==
Band members

- Kim McAuliffe – rhythm guitar, lead vocals on tracks 1, 2, 3, 5, 6, 8
- Kelly Johnson – lead guitar, lead vocals on tracks 1, 4, 6, 9
- Enid Williams – bass, lead vocals on track 11
- Gil Weston – bass, lead vocals on track 7, spoken words on track 10
- Denise Dufort – drums

Production

- Nigel Gray – producer, engineer

== Charts ==
Chart (1982)	Peak position
Canada Top Albums/CDs (RPM)	84
Finnish Albums (The Official Finnish Charts)	30
UK Albums (Official Charts)	27
