= Wildlife (Girlschool EP) =

EP by Girlschool
- Released: 29 March 1982
- Recorded: February–March 1982
- Studio: Surrey Sound Studios, England
- Genre: Heavy metal
- Length: 8:10
- Label: Bronze
- Producer: Nigel Gray

Girlschool chronology
Live and More EP (1982)	Wildlife (1982)	Screaming Blue Murder (1982)

Professional ratings
Review scores
Source	Rating
AllMusic	1.5/5 stars

Wildlife is an EP produced by British heavy metal band, Girlschool and published only in Europe. It was released in 1982 by Bronze Records as a launch for the album Screaming Blue Murder. During the recording sessions for the album, bassist and singer Enid Williams left the band and this EP is the last production made by the original formation. The songs "Don't Call It Love" and "Wildlife" were recorded again for the album with new bass player Ghislaine 'Gil' Weston and new vocal tracks. The EP was also available in a red vinyl edition.

== Track listing ==
No.	Title	Writer(s)	Length
1.	"Don't Call It Love"	Kim McAuliffe, Kelly Johnson	3:08
2.	"Wildlife"	Johnson, McAuliffe, Enid Williams	2:18
3.	"Don't Stop"	McAuliffe, Johnson, Williams, Denise Dufort	2:44

== Credits ==
- Kim McAuliffe – rhythm guitar, vocals
- Kelly Johnson – lead guitar, vocals
- Enid Williams – bass, vocals
- Denise Dufort – drums
