= King Biscuit Flower Hour Presents Girlschool =

Live album by Girlschool
- Released: 17 June 1997
- Recorded: 12 January 1984
- Venue: Brass A, Nashville, Tennessee, USA
- Genre: Heavy metal
- Length: 61:02
- Label: King Biscuit Flower Hour
- Producer: Len Handler, Steve Ship

Girlschool chronology
Girlschool Live (1995)	King Biscuit Flower Hour Presents Girlschool (1997)	Race with the Devil Live (1998)

Race with the Devil cover

Professional ratings
Review scores
Source	Rating
AllMusic	3/5 stars

King Biscuit Flower Hour Presents Girlschool is a live album by British heavy metal band Girlschool, released by King Biscuit Flower Hour Records in 1997. It was recorded during the 1984 Play Dirty USA tour. Kelly Johnson would leave the band soon thereafter. The album was reissued through Disky Records on 6 June 2002 with the title Race with the Devil and with the running order changed.

== Track listing ==
No.	Title	Length
1.	"Screaming Blue Murder"	4:17
2.	"Play Dirty"	4:15
3.	"You Got Me"	3:50
4.	"Hit and Run"	3:22
5.	"Nothing to Lose"	6:58
6.	"Future Flash"	4:46
7.	"Running for Cover"	3:15
8.	"Burning in the Heat"	3:13
9.	"Demolition Boys"	3:18
10.	"Tush"	2:55
11.	"Like It Like That"	5:37
12.	"C'mon Let's Go"	3:57
13.	"Emergency"	4:22
14.	"20th Century Boy"	3:45
15.	"Race with the Devil"	3:12

== Personnel ==
- Kim McAulliffe – vocals, guitar
- Kelly Johnson – lead guitar, vocals
- Gil Weston – bass, vocals
- Denise Dufort – drums
