= Nightmare at Maple Cross =

Studio album by Girlschool
- Released: May 1986
- Recorded: Jackson's Studios (Rickmansworth, England)
- Genre: Heavy metal
- Length: 34:47
- Label: GWR
- Producer: Vic Maile

Girlschool chronology
Running Wild (1985)	Nightmare at Maple Cross (1986)	Take a Bite (1988)

Singles from Nightmare at Maple Cross
- 1. "I'm the Leader of the Gang (I Am) / Never Too Late" Released: April 1986; 2. "All Day All Night / Play with Fire" Released: April 1987

Professional ratings
Review scores
Source	Rating
AllMusic	2.5/5 stars
Robert Christgau	B+
Collector's Guide to Heavy Metal	3/10
Kerrang!	4/5 stars
Metal Hammer	5/7

Nightmare at Maple Cross is the sixth studio album by the English heavy metal band Girlschool, released in 1986 by GWR Records. Under the direction of producer Vic Maile, this album marks the return of the band to the sound of their earlier works and to a four-piece formation. All tracks were composed by the four musicians, except for the cover of Mud's "Tiger Feet". The US version of the album included a duet with Gary Glitter covering his song, "I'm the Leader of the Gang (I Am)".

== Contemporary reviews ==
In the May 1988 issue of Circus magazine, music critic Paul Gallotta welcomed the release as a major surprise, noting that it marked a significant stylistic upgrade. The reviewer observed that while the British formation's prior career had been somewhat erratic—a fact he attributed to numerous personnel changes—the new material delivered a powerful impact capable of eclipsing most of their contemporary competition. Gallotta drew stylistic comparisons to Slade and Motörhead, arguing that the integration of infectious hooks and heavy, aggressive energy elevated the musicians into the upper tier of the genre. The publication specifically singled out tracks such as "All Day All Night" and "Turn It Up" as definitive entry points, while also advising audiences to anticipate the forthcoming North American concert tour.

== Track listing ==
All tracks by Girlschool, except "Tiger Feet" by Nicky Chinn and Mike Chapman

Side one
No.	Title	Length
1.	"All Day, All Night"	3:32
2.	"Play with Fire"	2:43
3.	"Danger Sign"	3:19
4.	"Never Too Late"	3:23
5.	"Tiger Feet" (Mud cover)	4:33

Side two
No.	Title	Length
6.	"Back for More"	3:32
7.	"Let's Go Crazy"	3:27
8.	"You Got Me (Under Your Spell)"	3:57
9.	"Let's Break Out"	3:01
10.	"Turn It Up"	3:20

- Track 6, in the US, was "I'm the Leader of the Gang (I Am)", re-numbering the tracks for a total of eleven in that region.

== Personnel ==
Band members

- Kim McAulliffe – vocals, rhythm guitar
- Cris Bonacci – lead guitar
- Gil Weston-Jones – bass
- Denise Dufort – drums

Production

- Vic Maile – producer, engineer, mixing
