= Live and More EP =

Live and More

EP by Girlschool
- Released: 1982
- Genre: Heavy metal
- Length: 18:31
- Label: Victor Japan

Girlschool chronology
Hit and Run (1981)	Live and More (1982)	Wildlife EP (1982)

Live and More is an EP by British heavy metal band, Girlschool published only in Japan. It was released in 1982 by Victor Musical Industries to coincide with their first Japan tour. The EP includes 2 live tracks and 2 studio tracks.

== Track listing ==
No.	Title	Length
1.	"Tonight" (live)	2:33
2.	"Demolition Boys" (live)	3:37
3.	"Please Don't Touch"	2:47
4.	"Hit and Run"	3:02
5.	"C'mon Let's Go"	3:33
6.	"Furniture Fire"	2:59

== Credits ==
- Kim McAuliffe – rhythm guitar, vocals
- Kelly Johnson – lead guitar, vocals
- Enid Williams – bass, vocals
- Denise Dufort – drums
