= Believe (Girlschool album) =

Studio album by Girlschool
- Released: 26 July 2004
- Recorded: Sonic One Studios, Llangennech, Wales, The Outhouse Studio (bonus tracks)
- Genre: Heavy metal
- Length: 52:42
- Label: Communiqué Records
- Producer: Tim Hamill and Girlschool

Girlschool chronology
The Second Wave: 25 Years of NWOBHM (2003)	Believe (2004)	Legacy (2008)

DVD edition cover

Believe is the tenth studio album by British heavy metal band, Girlschool, released on Communiqué Records in 2004. It was the first album entirely played by the formation with new lead guitarist Jackie Chambers. It was re-released in 2008 in a limited edition, including the DVD Around the World, with footage from concerts and tours of 2004 and 2005. This limited edition was self-produced and sold through their official website and at concerts.

== Track listing ==
No.	Title	Writer(s)	Length
1.	"Come on Up"	Enid Williams, Jackie Chambers	3:40
2.	"Let's Get Hard"	Chambers, Kim McAuliffe, Williams	3:39
3.	"Crazy"	Williams, Chambers	5:37
4.	"We All Love to (Rock 'n' Roll)"	Chambers, Williams, McAuliffe	3:22
5.	"Secret"	Chambers, McAuliffe	3:45
6.	"New Beginning"	Chambers, McAuliffe	3:32
7.	"C'mon"	Chambers, Williams, McAuliffe	3:19
8.	"Never Say Never"	Williams, Chambers	3:24
9.	"You Say"	Chambers, McAuliffe	3:20
10.	"Feel Good"	Chambers, McAuliffe, Williams	2:42
11.	"Hold on Tight"	Chambers, McAuliffe, Williams	3:51
12.	"Yes Means Yes"	Williams, Chambers	2:39
13.	"We All Have to Choose"	Chambers, McAuliffe	3:11
14.	"Play Around" (bonus track)	McAuliffe, Chambers, Williams, Denise Dufort	3:36
15.	"Passion" (bonus track)	Williams, Chambers, McAuliffe, Dufort	3:05

== DVD track listing ==
1. "Come on Up" video clip
2. Girlschool Around the World
3. Interview with Radio Northampton
4. Photogallery
5. Jackie's Birthday

== Credits ==
- Kim McAuliffe – rhythm guitar, lead vocals on tracks 2, 4, 5, 6, 9, 10, 11, 13, 14, backing vocals
- Jackie Chambers – lead guitar, backing vocals
- Enid Williams – bass, lead vocals on tracks 1, 3, 7, 8, 12, 15, backing vocals
- Denise Dufort – drums
