= Kelly Johnson (guitarist) =

English guitarist and singer (1958–2007)

- Johnson performing in 1983

Background information
- Born: Bernadette Jean Johnson; 20 June 1958; Edmonton, London, England
- Died: 15 July 2007 (aged 49)
- Genres: Heavy metal; hard rock
- Occupations: Musician; songwriter; singer
- Instruments: Guitar; vocals
- Years active: 1978–2000
- Labels: Bronze Records; Communiqué
- Formerly of: Girlschool; World's Cutest Killers

Bernadette Jean "Kelly" Johnson (20 June 1958 – 15 July 2007) was an English guitarist and singer, widely known in the UK in the early 1980s as the lead guitarist of the all-female rock band Girlschool.

== Early life ==
Johnson started playing piano after her father when she was five years old, switching to guitar at age twelve. She attended Edmonton County School in Edmonton, London, where she discovered rock music and played bass and piano in school bands. She went back to guitar and was already writing and playing her own material when she met her future bandmates at the age of 19.

== Career ==
=== 1978–1984: Girlschool ===
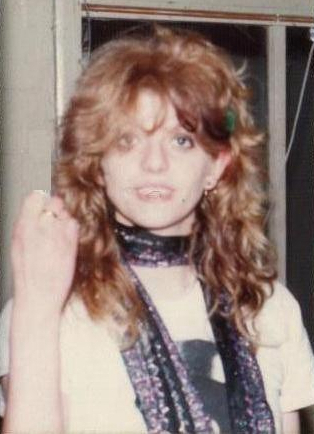
Johnson in 1981

After her first encounter with Kim McAuliffe and Enid Williams of Painted Lady in April 1978, she was immediately accepted in the ranks of their new band, which took the name Girlschool.

Girlschool's raucous guitar playing style, as well as her leather-clad outfit soon won the band a cult following, giving them prominence in the emerging new wave of British heavy metal, thanks also to their strong relationship with contemporaries Motörhead.

Johnson was a songwriter, playing lead guitar and singing both lead and backing vocals on the group's first four albums. She provided both a strong visual focus for the band with her tall figure and blonde hair and an excellent musical contribution with her trenchant guitar playing. On hearing Johnson's riffs on "Race With the Devil" guitarist Jeff Beck was quoted "There's no way that's a girl playing" a remark described by the DJ John Peel as the most sexist comment he had ever heard. Whilst Lemmy of Motörhead declared "I thought they were fucking great. I got them on the tour in the first place and everybody else went like, 'Ugh, girls,' and I said, 'Fuck you, they're as good as you.' Kelly Johnson, on a good day, is as good as Jeff Beck in his rock & roll days. She's a fucking brilliant guitar player." Girlschool did not take feminist positions, but as an all-female band in a genre dominated by male musicians and often by machismo and sexist attitudes, their existence was a statement in itself. Moreover, Johnson professed from the beginning of her career a strong sensibility to environmental themes, which was expressed in some of her songs. She became later an environmentalist, an activist for animal rights and also a vegetarian. Girlschool had their best UK chart success in 1980 and 1981, with the EP St. Valentine's Day Massacre and the album Hit and Run, but their success soon declined and their approach to the US market with the album Play Dirty was not as successful as hoped. At the beginning of 1984, Johnson left the band. As Kim McAuliffe stated in 1997, "basically Kelly just got fed up with the whole thing (...) she wasn't into heavy rock anymore".

=== Solo and World's Cutest Killers ===
Johnson left England for the US, to start a new career and to live with Vicki Blue, former bassist of the American band The Runaways, who was also her manager. In Los Angeles, she wrote her own music and recorded demos of mainstream rock with large use of synthesizers and electronic effects, but no label put her under contract. In 1987, she joined the rock band World's Cutest Killers, which included on rhythm guitar and vocals former Painted Lady and The Go-Go's member Kathy Valentine. WCK changed their name to The Renegades and worked the local club circuit, but gained no record contract. Concluding her experience with this band after two years, she left music altogether to learn sign language and work with the deaf.

=== 1993–1999: Girlschool reunion ===
In 1993, after almost ten years in the US, she returned to the UK to resume her role as lead guitarist of Girlschool for a reunion tour. She remained with the band and toured incessantly until 1999, when she was diagnosed with cancer. After she left the band Johnson remained associated with Girlschool, playing the occasional gig, instructing her substitute Jackie Chambers and gathering photos and material for a band biography.

== Death ==
Johnson died on Sunday 15 July 2007, aged 49, after a six-year battle against spinal cancer. That she had the disease was not widely known outside her close friends and family. At her memorial, her friend and former bandmate Tracey Lamb read the eulogy.

It doesn't shock or surprise me that there are so many of you here today for Kelly because Kelly touched all of our hearts with her love, friendship, her amazing persona and the way she inspired so many of us to take up or continue to play music. She was a true rock star, her agility on stage and when recording, her prolific song writing and strong delivery in every performance will always be remembered.

Girlschool performed a tribute gig on 20 August 2007 at the Soho Revue Bar in London, with many of Johnson's friends and former band members.

== Guitars and equipment ==
During her first stint with Girlschool, Kelly Johnson used a 1980 Gibson Les Paul Gold Top guitar, modified with gold plated machine heads and DiMarzio pickups and an Ibanez Destroyer-II. She used Marshall 50 and 100 amplifiers and no pedals or effects. During her time staying in Los Angeles, she used instead a tiger striped Aria RS guitar, which she continued to use in the 1990s along with a Gibson SG.

== Discography ==
=== Studio albums ===
- Demolition (1980)
- Hit and Run (1981)
- Screaming Blue Murder (1982)
- Play Dirty (1983)
- 21st Anniversary: Not That Innocent (2002)

=== EPs ===
- St. Valentine's Day Massacre (EP with Motörhead) (1981)
- Live and More (EP) (1982)
- Wildlife (EP) (1982)
- 1-2-3-4 Rock and Roll (EP) (1983)

=== Live albums ===
- Girlschool Live (1995)
- King Biscuit Flower Hour Presents Girlschool (1997)
- Race with the Devil Live (1998)
- Race with the Devil (2002)

=== Compilations ===
- A Quiet Night In (1981)
- Cheers You Lot! (1989)
- C'mon Let's Go (1991)
- The Collection (1991)
- The Best of Girlschool (1993)
- From the Vaults (1994)
- Emergency (1997)
- The Collection (2 CD) (1998)
- Can't Keep a Good Girl Down (1999)
- The Very Best of Girlschool (2002)
- Wild at Heart (2006)
- The Singles (2007)

=== Singles ===
- "Take It All Away / It Could Be Better" (1979)
- "Emergency / Furniture Fire" (1980)
- "Nothing to Lose / Baby Doll" (1980)
- "Race with the Devil / Take It All Away" (1980) UK #49
- "Yeah Right / The Hunter" (1980)
- "Hit And Run / Tonight" (1981) UK #32
- "C'Mon Let's Go / Tonight (live)" (1981) UK #42
- "Don't Call It Love / Wildlife" (1982)
- "20th Century Boy / Breaking All the Rules" (1983)
- "Burning in the Heat / Surrender" (1984)
