= Girlschool =

British, all-female, heavy metal band

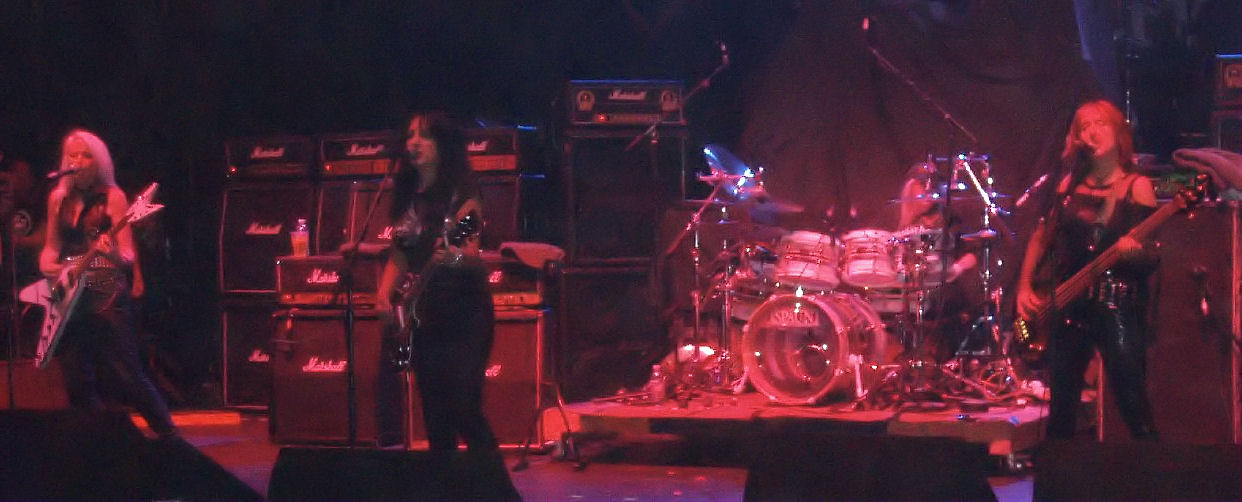
- Girlschool playing live in London in 2009

Background information
- Origin: London, England
- Genres: Hard rock; heavy metal; biker metal
- Years active: 1978–present
- Labels: City; Bronze; Mercury; GWR; Communiqué; Wacken; Cleopatra; Silver Lining Music
- Spinoffs: She-Devils; Strange Girls
- Members: Kim McAuliffe; Denise Dufort; Jackie Chambers; Olivia Airey
- Past members: Kelly Johnson; Gil Weston; Cris Bonacci; Tracey Lamb; Jackie Bodimead; Jackie Carrera; Enid Williams
- Website: www.girlschool.co.uk

Girlschool are a British rock band that formed in the new wave of British heavy metal scene in 1978. Frequently associated with contemporaries Motörhead, they are the longest-running all-female rock band, still active after more than 40 years. Formed from a school band called Painted Lady, Girlschool enjoyed strong media exposure and commercial success in the UK in the early 1980s with three albums of "punk-tinged metal" and a few singles, but lost their momentum in the following years.

In the 1990s and 2000s, Girlschool focused on shows and tours and made few studio albums. During their career they travelled the world, playing in many rock and metal festivals and co-headlining with or supporting important hard rock and heavy metal bands. They maintain a worldwide cult following, and are an inspiration for many female rock musicians. Despite frequent changes of line-up, all original members who are still alive—Kim McAuliffe, Enid Williams and Denise Dufort—had been in the band until 2019, when Williams quit. Original lead guitarist and singer Kelly Johnson died of cancer in 2007.

== History ==
=== 1975–1978: Painted Lady ===
In 1975, school friends and neighbours from Wandsworth, South London, Kim McAuliffe (rhythm guitar, vocals) and Dinah Enid Williams (bass, vocals) formed an all-girl rock cover band called Painted Lady, together with Tina Gayle on drums. Deirdre Cartwright joined the new band on lead guitar, Val Lloyd replaced Gayle on drums and they started playing the local pub scene. "The reason we were all girls was we couldn’t find any blokes who wanted to play with us! This was the natural thing to do", McAuliffe explained to Gary Graff in 1997 about the all-female composition of the band.

Cartwright, who was older and more musically experienced than the other members, left in 1977 to form the band Tour De Force and then followed different professional opportunities in the music business; she is now a renowned jazz guitarist. Her place in the band was briefly taken by visiting American Kathy Valentine, who approached the band through an advertisement in the British music newspaper Melody Maker. When Valentine returned to the United States in 1978 to form the Textones and later join The Go-Go's as bass player, Painted Lady broke up. However, McAuliffe and Williams were still willing to pursue a musical career to escape their day jobs in a bank and a bakery; they reformed the band, recruiting lead guitarist Kelly Johnson and drummer Denise Dufort in April 1978. The new line-up changed their name to Girlschool—taking it from "Girls' School", the B-side of the hit single "Mull of Kintyre" (1977) by Paul McCartney and Wings— and immediately hit the road, touring small venues in France, Ireland and Great Britain.

=== 1978–1982: N.W.O.B.H.M. ===
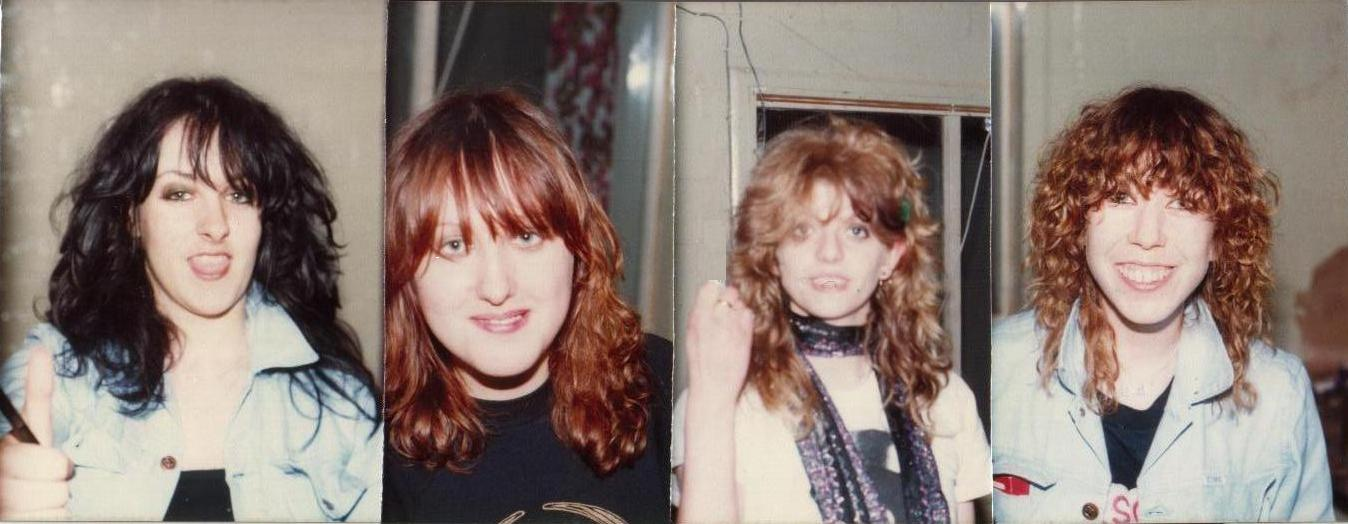
Girlschool original line-up: Kim McAuliffe, Enid Williams, Kelly Johnson, Denise Dufort (1981)

In December 1978, Girlschool released their first single, "Take It All Away", on the independent record label City Records, owned by Phil Scott, a friend of the band. The single had some radio airplay and circulated in the underground scene; it came to the hearing of Ian Kilmister, commonly known as Lemmy, leader of the British rock band Motörhead, who wanted to meet the band. He, together with Motörhead and Hawkwind manager Doug Smith, went to see the band performing live and offered them a support slot on Motörhead's Overkill tour in the spring of 1979. This was the start of an enduring relationship between the two bands. After the tour and a few other shows supporting Welsh band Budgie, Doug Smith became the manager of Girlschool and obtained an audition with the British label Bronze Records, at the time home of Uriah Heep, Motörhead and Juicy Lucy. Bronze's owner Gerry Bron himself attended the audition; he was impressed by Girlschool's stage presence and musicianship, offering them a contract with his label in December 1979.

I went to an early rehearsal and was surprised how well (Girlschool) played their instruments – how terribly chauvinistic of me. None of them were particularly good looking, although from a distance Kelly Johnson looked like that Charlie's Angels' actress, Farrah Fawcett, but there was something about them...

— Gerry Bron

The British rock movement known as the new wave of British heavy metal (frequently abbreviated as NWOBHM), which started in the late 1970s and broke in the mainstream in the early 1980s, was just exploding in the United Kingdom and the band gained the support of a strong label at exactly the right time to exploit the moment and form a solid fan base.

The band entered the recording studio with experienced producer Vic Maile in April 1980. Vic Maile had been working as live sound engineer for many important acts, like The Who, Led Zeppelin, The Kinks and Jimi Hendrix, producing also the first two seminal albums of Dr. Feelgood and a few punk bands in the late 1970s. He captured the raw but powerful sound of Girlschool in ten short songs, with lead vocals shared by Williams, McAuliffe and Johnson. Girlschool released their debut album, Demolition, in June 1980, alongside the singles "Emergency", "Nothing to Lose" and "Race with the Devil". Demolition reached No.28 in the UK Album Chart in July 1980.

In the same period, albums and singles from Judas Priest, Saxon, Def Leppard, Iron Maiden, Motörhead and other bands of the NWOBHM reached high positions in the UK charts, while the same bands did tours and concerts all over Europe. Girlschool participated in this frenzied touring activity, travelling in Great Britain and visiting Europe both as headliner act and as support to label mates Uriah Heep and Motörhead. On 20 August, Girlschool and Motörhead were filmed performing live at the Nottingham Theatre Royal for the Rockstage programme, broadcast by the ATV station on 4 April 1981. In this period, the band was subjected to intense media coverage by music magazines, radio and TV, interested in the novelty of a successful British all-female metal band. The barrage of interviews and promotion did not stop the production of songs and the girls released the new single "Yeah Right" in November 1980.

"Please Don't Touch"
This 1981 cover song was a collaboration between Girlschool and Motörhead and the most successful release for both bands at the time

In December 1980, Girlschool officially started recording the follow-up to Demolition, again with producer Vic Maile, who had meanwhile produced Motörhead's classic album Ace of Spades. During the sessions, Maile suggested a studio recording team-up with Motörhead, resulting in the release of the EP St. Valentine's Day Massacre. The EP contains the cover of Johnny Kidd & The Pirates’ song "Please Don't Touch" and two self-covers, with Motörhead performing Girlschool's "Emergency", and Girlschool playing Motörhead's "Bomber". Dufort played drums on all songs, because Motörhead's drummer Phil "Philthy Animal" Taylor was recovering from a neck injury. She also played the drums during the BBC One Top of the Pops TV show of 19 February 1981, where the two bands performed "Please Don’t Touch" under the moniker Headgirl. The EP reached No.5 in the UK Single Chart in February 1981 and was certified silver in December 1981, the best sale performance for both bands at the time.

The album Hit and Run was released in April 1981, soon followed by the eponymous single. Both releases were very successful in the UK, with the album reaching position No.5 and the single position No.33 in the respective charts. The album charted also in New Zealand and in Canada, where it went gold. Hit and Run was not released in the USA until 1982, with a different track listing including songs from Demolition. The success of their second album made Girlschool a rising attraction in the boiling British hard rock and heavy metal scene, ensuring headliner slots in medium-sized arenas in their sold-out UK tour or guest slots in stadium size concerts of major attractions like Black Sabbath and Rush. No dates in the USA were arranged, but Girlschool visited Canada in July. Their 1981 tour culminated on 28 August, headlining the Friday night of the three-day Reading Festival. The Friday Rock Show on BBC Radio 1 would later broadcast the Reading set, but the recording has not received an official release.

Headlining the Friday night of the 1981 Reading Festival was the highlight of Girlschool's career

At the beginning of 1982, Girlschool did a European tour and, at the last Danish date in Copenhagen with supporting act Mercyful Fate, McAuliffe received a potentially-fatal electric shock from her microphone. She recovered fast enough to complete a Japanese tour, to do other European shows supporting Rainbow on their Difficult to Cure tour and to start working on new material for the next album. However, the gruelling schedule of recordings, promotional work and concerts had started to take its toll on the group, with bassist Enid Williams the first to give up, right after the release of Wildlife in March 1982, an EP designed to launch the upcoming album. On the recommendation of Lemmy, Williams was replaced by Ghislaine 'Gil' Weston, former bassist of the punk band The Killjoys.

Girlschool's third album Screaming Blue Murder was recorded in February and March 1982 under the direction of Nigel Gray, the successful producer of The Police and The Professionals. The album had a worldwide release in June 1982 but, despite the strong promotion, it reached only No.27 in the UK Album Chart. Critics generally considered Screaming Blue Murder a weaker offering in comparison with the preceding two albums.

Girlschool remained anyway a strong live attraction and their 1982 world tour led the band for the first time in the US to play in stadiums, supporting Iron Maiden and Scorpions. NWOBHM acts like Judas Priest and Def Leppard started to be very popular in America and the girls and their record label had no intention to fall back in the conquest of that large market.

=== 1983–1985: American sirens ===
Back in England, the continuous succession of recording sessions, gigs and promotional work started again, but the strain of this routine was wearing out Kelly Johnson, who was also tired of the music the band had been playing for four years without a break. The other members struggled to convince her to stay and the chance to record with British celebrities Noddy Holder and Jim Lea as producers persuaded the guitarist to carry on with Girlschool. Holder and Lea, who had returned in those years to great success and popularity in Great Britain with the 70s rock band Slade, were hired to produce only a single, with the following album already scheduled to be recorded in Los Angeles with Quiet Riot producer Spencer Proffer. However, the good chemistry found with the two Slade members led the band to decide to record not a single, but their whole fourth studio album in North London with Lea and Holder, giving up the trip to the USA. This time the group changed sensibly both their appearance and their musical style in order to appeal to a large American audience, which Bronze considered more oriented toward AOR and glam rock than to the 'biker metal' Girlschool had produced before. Play Dirty, released in October 1983, is an album with a very polished sound, filled with keyboards, choruses and melodies, but it lacks much of the aggression and power of the preceding works. The album contains covers of the Slade songs "High & Dry" and "Burning in the Heat" and of T.Rex’s "20th Century Boy", which was also released as a single. Play Dirty failed to enter the top 50 chart in the UK and had a lukewarm reception by fans and critics at home. A struggle between Bronze and PolyGram for the worldwide contract of the band resulted also in poor promotion for the album in the USA. Moreover, a disastrous performance at Wembley Arena supporting ZZ Top did not help Girlschool's already degraded image in Great Britain.

Girlschool upgraded their look in 1983 to appeal to the US market

Girlschool embarked in a long US tour to promote the album, sometimes as support to Quiet Riot and Blue Öyster Cult, but more often as headliner in small venues after uncomfortable travels. Johnson, unable to tolerate the unhealthy life on the road, quit the band before completing the US tour, hurting the promotion of the album in America. She went to live in Los Angeles with Vicki Blue, former bassist of The Runaways. With the departure of Kelly Johnson, who was often considered the visual and musical focal point of the band, the almost bankrupt Bronze Records failed to extend the band's recording contract for a follow-up album.

At the beginning of 1984, Girlschool were in need of a new lead guitar player and singer, of a new recording contract and chart success but, despite the difficult situation, the band did not give up. The search for new members ended with the arrival of guitarist Cris Bonacci and singer and keyboard player Jackie Bodimead, both from the all-female hard rock band She. She were playing in London clubs at the time, trying to get a record contract and attract the attention of the British music press.

The new Girlschool, now a five-piece group, signed with the PolyGram American subsidiary Mercury Records, once home of the American all-girls rock band The Runaways. The label saw in the band an opportunity to produce a rival for chart-winning female-fronted bands like Heart and Lita Ford and pushed the music of the band even more towards FM friendly American hard rock. The band was paired with producer Nick Tauber, who had produced the first albums of Thin Lizzy and the most successful albums of Toyah and Marillion, contributing also to the launch of the British glam metal act Girl. The resulting album Running Wild, sported ten keyboard-laden tracks much different from Girlschool's most successful music. The record label decided to release the album only in the US in February 1985, but actually gave little support to its marketing. The review of the magazine Kerrang! reflects the opinions of Dufort and McAuliffe, which described years later the album as rubbish or even worse. Running Wild had insignificant sales on the US market, not representing the breakthrough the band and the label had hoped for. A live performance of Girlschool as a quintet at Camden Palace in London was taped for the VHS Play Dirty Live, which was released in 1985 and reissued on DVD with the title Live from London in 2005.

The band did some shows supporting the glam rock band Hanoi Rocks in Great Britain, before joining Deep Purple's comeback world tour, where Girlschool played in a supporting role all over the USA. A tour of India and the Far East completed their live activities for 1985. Vocal duties were shared on stage between McAuliffe and Bodimead, who also played keyboards. At the end of the tour, Jackie Bodimead left the band to pursue a solo career.

=== 1986–1990: 'back to square one' ===
After the bad commercial results of Running Wild, Mercury broke the contract with Girlschool, leaving the band without financial backup and with a career in dire straits. "Back to square one again", McAuliffe said at the time. The band decided to go back to their roots, remaining a quartet with only McAuliffe on vocals and going on a UK tour in November – December 1985 supporting Blue Öyster Cult; their immediate goal was to play as much as they could and regain some of their fan base. In early 1986, thanks again to Lemmy's suggestion, they eventually signed for Doug Smith's new label GWR Records, which also included in their roster Motörhead. The girls immediately started working on a new album with their old producer Vic Maile at Jackson's Studio in Rickmansworth. The first output of their new work was a team-up with British glam rock singer Gary Glitter for the cover of his 1973 hit "I'm the Leader of the Gang (I Am)", which was released as a single in April 1986. The album Nightmare at Maple Cross, released in July of the same year, marked for the band the return to the sound of Hit and Run and to their trademark abrasive lyrics. The album received fairly good reviews, but it did not enter the British charts and was released in North America only a year later. The following European tour saw the girls supporting the Scottish hard rock band Nazareth.

In January 1987, after five years with the group, bassist Gil Weston-Jones left Girlschool to spend more time with her American husband. Her place was quickly taken by Tracey Lamb, who had been the bass player of the all-female NWOBHM band Rock Goddess and a bandmate of Cris Bonacci in She. Girlschool spent the rest of the year promoting the album with a US tour and appearances in various TV shows across Europe, followed by a long European tour supporting usual label mates Motörhead.

At the beginning of 1988, the band started rehearsing material for a new album with producer André Jacquemin, who had worked on all the Monty Python’s records. The album Take a Bite was published by GWR in October 1988 and follows in the steps of Nightmare at Maple Cross, presenting powerful and melodic metal songs, tinged with the humour typical of the band. To promote the album, Girlschool did a UK tour with Gary Glitter, followed by a North American tour. In 1989, they travelled across Europe with Dio and to the Soviet Union with Black Sabbath, until the end of the year. After their return from Russia, GWR did not renew their contract and the band practically broke up. Musical tastes were changing worldwide in favour of grunge and more extreme metal genres, compelling most acts originated from the new wave of British heavy metal to disband or to reduce their activities, and the same thing happened to Girlschool.

=== 1990–1991: She-Devils and Strange Girls ===
Even if not officially disbanded, Girlschool had become "not a full-time thing anymore" for the members of the group. In this period, Cris Bonacci joined British singer Toyah Willcox, for the promotion of the album Ophelia's Shadow. A brief tour of Spain was Girlschool's only activity of 1990, but in December, McAuliffe, Bonacci, Dufort and returning bass player Enid Williams, teamed up with Toyah Willcox under the name She-Devils for the first edition of the Women in Music festival at Shaw Theatre in London, performing both Girlschool and Toyah’s songs. A few months later, the same musicians reunited again under the new name Strange Girls, with Lydie Gallais replacing Dufort on drums. Strange Girls toured clubs in Great Britain in 1991 and 1992 and supported The Beach Boys in their German dates in the summer of 1991. The band wrote a few songs and produced a demo, but the only published track from this period is the song "Lust for Love", which can be found on Toyah's album Take the Leap! (1993).

=== 1992–2002: living on tour ===
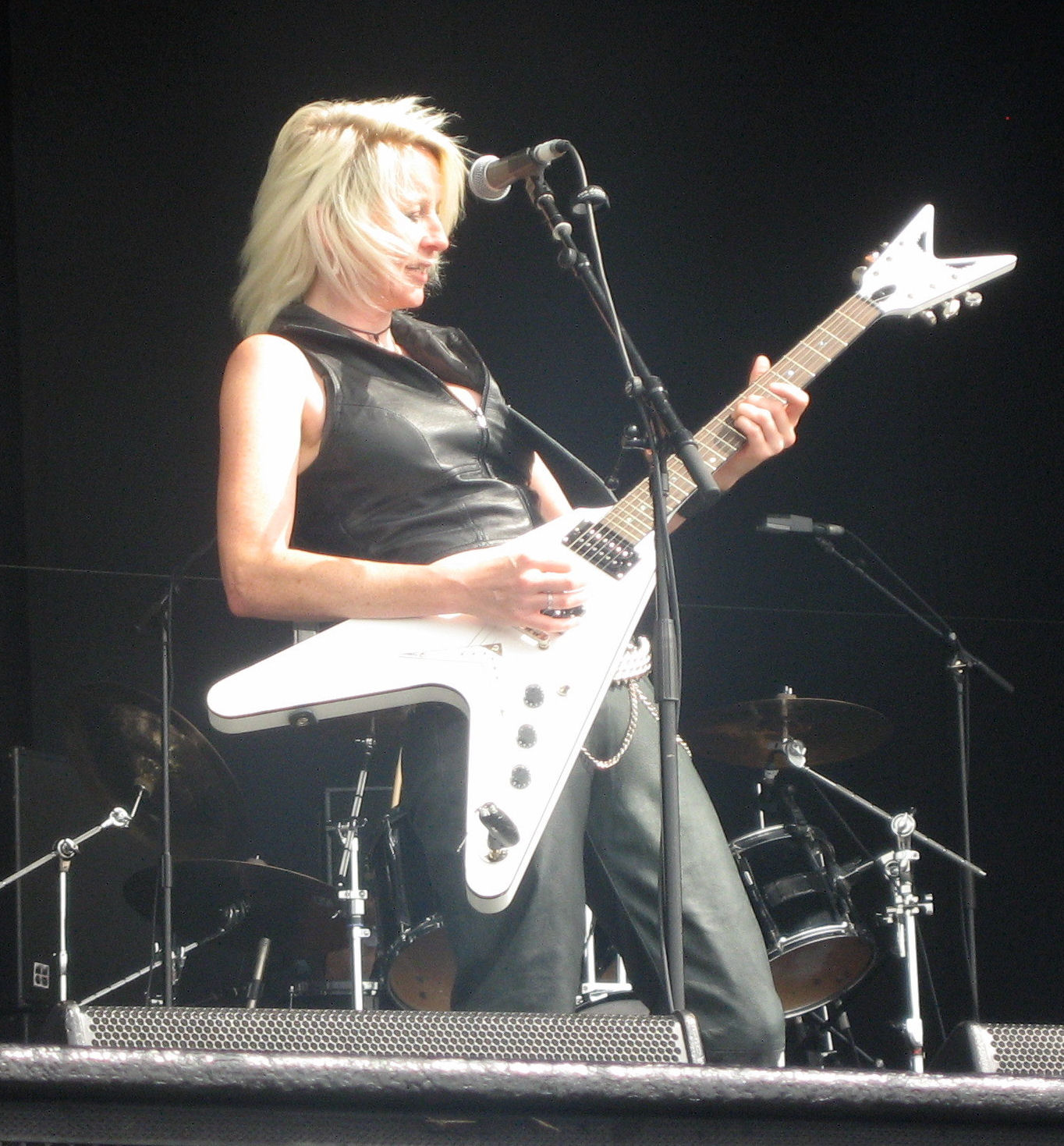
Lead guitarist Jackie 'Jax' Chambers playing live at Bloodstock Open Air 2009

Girlschool went back in action in 1992, recruiting Jackie Carrera on bass and recording Girlschool, their first self-produced album, which was distributed worldwide by the British indie label Communiqué Records. The lower visibility of the album distributed by an indie label marked the definitive transition to cult status for the band, renouncing to many expectations of big sales. Girlschool were now their own managers, relying on their solid live show and on their reputation with promoters and other artists to get gigs and work. As stated in an interview to the British television show Raw Power, Girlschool would "play in every single toilet that we can find!"

After a few European dates, returning bassist Tracey Lamb replaced Carrera before a new tour in the United States. But more line-up changes were in store for the band because, at the end of 1992, Cris Bonacci left the band to become a touring musician and then a producer. In 1993, her place as lead guitarist was taken back by Kelly Johnson, who returned after nine years to England from LA, where she had played in a band with Kathy Valentine and written and produced her own music. The plethora of compilations of old Girlschool material that had started to be released from 1989 kept the band alive on the CD market and guaranteed enough visibility to get a good number of gigs every year in every part of the world, often supporting other NWOBHM acts like Motörhead or Saxon. In this period, the girls were also present at rock festivals all over Europe, both as Girlschool or separately in other outfits. In 1995, Communiqué Records released Girlschool Live, a live album documenting the intense live shows of the band in that period and which included the new tracks "Knife" and "Little Green Men". Girlschool continued their live activity in the 1990s, culminating with a participation to the Wacken Open Air festival on Friday, 6 August 1999.

In all this time, the band had been writing new songs. In September 1998, they began to record a new album; however, touring commitments and new line-up changes prevented Girlschool from completing it. Johnson amicably quit Girlschool in 1999, followed by Lamb in 2000. They were replaced by new lead guitarist Jackie 'Jax' Chambers and by Enid Williams, who finally rejoined the group after eighteen years. Johnson, who had been diagnosed with cancer, and Lamb nevertheless remained closely associated with the other band members.

21st Anniversary: Not That Innocent was finally released at the beginning of 2002 and co-produced by Girlschool and Tim Hamill. The album contains tracks recorded three years earlier by the previous line-up, with the addition of the songs "Coming Your Way" and "Innocent" recorded by the current one.

=== 2003–present: recent activities ===
In 2003, the band was again in a recording studio for The Second Wave: 25 Years of NWOBHM, a split album conceived by the label Communiqué, comprising five songs each for Oliver/Dawson Saxon, Tygers of Pan Tang and Girlschool. A tour of the three aforementioned bands could not be organized and, in October 2004, Girlschool toured supporting the album with Tygers of Pan Tang and Paul Di'Anno.

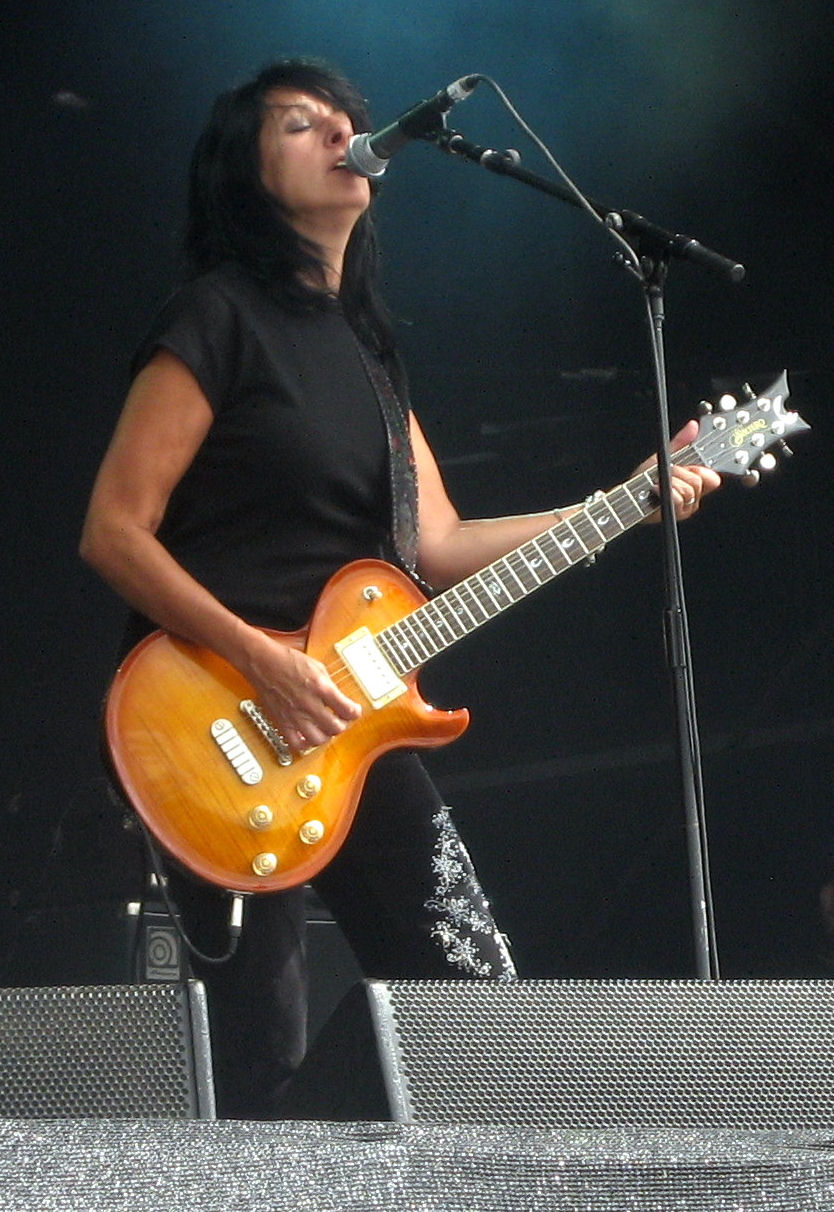
Lead vocalist Kim McAuliffe at Bloodstock Open Air 2009

Preceded by the publication of the re-mastered editions of their first four albums, Girlschool released the studio album Believe in July 2004. The wish to explore new territories is obvious in some tracks of the album, which is the first one entirely composed by the new line-up at Chambers’ home studio. The changed line-up brought a new balance in the band, with Chambers involved in the composition of all songs. Moreover, the chance to use two lead singers again led to improvements in the vocal and choral parts. Unfortunately, the album was poorly distributed and remained unknown to large parts of its potential audience. In 2005, the band re-released Believe in a new package with a DVD containing footage taken from concerts of the 2000s and sold it through their official website. A US and European tour followed Believe first release, but the project for releasing in 2004 a live DVD tentatively titled Girlschool Live at the Garage never materialised. In June 2005, Girlschool did a UK tour with Vixen and another one in November–December with old pals Motörhead, celebrating Lemmy's band 30th anniversary. During the same year, they were also on stage at summer festivals in the Netherlands and England and opened for Alice Cooper in Spain.

Rock and metal festivals have become a constant for the band, that performed both in large open air meetings in Germany (Headbangers Open Air 2006, Bang Your Head!!! 2007, Wacken Open Air 2008 and Wacken Rocks 2009), France (Hellfest Summer Open Air 2009), England (Hard Rock Hell 2007 and 2009, Bloodstock Open Air 2009) and the USA (Power Box Festival 2007) and in smaller settings, like the Rock of Ages Fest in England in 2007 and the Metal Female Voices Fest in Belgium in 2008. Girlschool were opening act for Heaven & Hell in 2007, for Dio in 2008 and for Hawkwind and Motörhead in 2009.

On 15 July 2007, Kelly Johnson died of spinal cancer, after six years of painful therapy and treatment of her illness. At Kelly's memorial, Tracey Lamb read the eulogy she had written for her. The band performed a tribute gig on 20 August 2007 at the Soho Revue Bar in London, with many of Johnson's friends and former Girlschool's members and a concert for Cancer Research UK at Rock of Ages Fest in Tamworth on 8 September 2007.

The new album Legacy, released in October 2008, celebrates both the departed guitarist and the 30th anniversary of Girlschool, making them the so far longest-running female rock band in the world. The recording was self-produced with the assistance of Tim Hamill and the compositions are more individual, revealing a large array of influences, going from NWOBHM, to punk, to West Coast alternative rock. To emphasize the celebrative mood, the album features many guest musicians, with members of Heaven & Hell, Twisted Sister and Motörhead supplying vocals and guitars in many tracks. Kelly Johnson's 'ghost' presence permeates the album and the song "Legend" is especially dedicated to her. The album received excellent reviews and the German label SPV/Steamhammer guaranteed the worldwide distribution. Girlschool performed a special show celebrating their 30th anniversary on 16 December at the Astoria 2 in London.

Girlschool were among the many female singers performing on veteran German hard rock singer Doro Pesch’s single "Celebrate", released in 2008. Jackie Chambers and Enid Williams were also present on stage at Doro’s 25th anniversary celebration concert on 13 December 2008 in Düsseldorf.

At the beginning of 2010, Girlschool contributed to the release of the cover of their single "Emergency" by Cornish youth music charity Livewire, in order to raise funds for the victims of the 2010 Haiti earthquake. The band went on tour in Europe with the Canadian metal band Anvil in 2010. The band spent time in studio re-recording their classic 1981 album Hit and Run, during 2011. The new version of the LP, titled Hit and Run – Revisited, was released on 26 September 2011 to celebrate the original album's 30th anniversary.

Girlschool continued to tour Europe and South America in 2011-12 and returned in Japan in 2013. In early 2015, they recorded a new album titled Guilty as Sin with producer Chris Tsangarides, which was released on 13 November 2015. On 30 January 2019, it was announced on the band's website that "Girlschool have parted ways once again with bassist Enid Williams" and that Tracey Lamb would return to replace her.

On 27 February 2023 Girlschool's labelmates Alcatrazz released the single "Don't Get Mad... Get Even" which saw them contribute vocals. On 25 April the band announced their first album in eight years WTFortyfive?, due to be released in July. The same day they released the first single "Are You Ready?" and its accompanying music video.

== Music and style ==
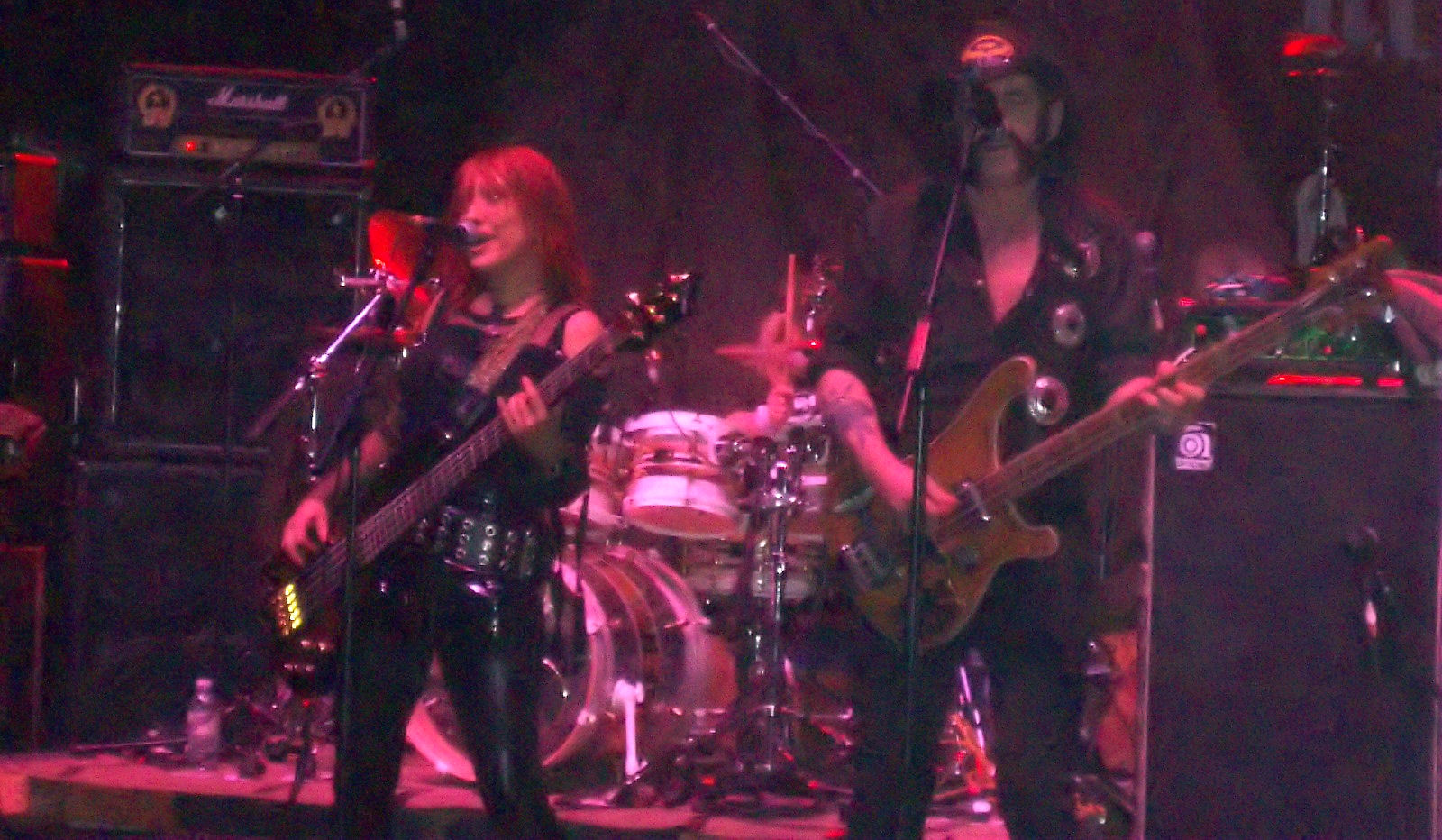
Enid Williams and Lemmy singing "Please Don't Touch" live in 2009. The ties that bind Motörhead and Girlschool started in the 1980s and were still strong until Motörhead's dissolution in 2015

Revolver magazine editor Christopher Scapelliti aptly described Girlschool's music as a "punk-metal mix tough, but poppy enough for radio". The influences of classic hard rock and heavy metal are present in the musical background of all the original band members and they are particularly evident in the clean and sometimes bluesy solo guitar work of Kelly Johnson. Artists like Led Zeppelin, Black Sabbath, David Bowie, T. Rex, Suzi Quatro have been influential on the Girlschool members.

Punk rock had a direct influence in the birth of new wave and new wave of British heavy metal and that music was still popular when the band was formed. Moreover, both Denise Dufort and Gil Weston had played in punk bands before joining Girlschool. "We're both too heavy to be New Wave and too punk to be a heavy metal band", McAuliffe explained to Robbi Millar of Sounds in 1980. The raw and almost live recording sound of their first two Vic Maile produced albums represents perfectly the core music of the band in the years from 1979 to 1982, which were the most successful for Girlschool. The combination of metal and punk was a large part of the sound which also propelled Motörhead to notoriety and chart success in the early 80s in the United Kingdom. This sound, the tours and recordings made together with Lemmy's band, the girls’ denim and leather look, as much as their rowdy and alcohol driven off-stage behaviour soon gained Girlschool the moniker of 'sisters of Motörhead', which they were often identified with until Motörhead became defunct at the end of 2015. Their close association with Motörhead at the beginning of Girlschool's career helped achieve their early success.

The mounting pressure to appeal to a mainstream audience, the quick change of tastes in British rock fans with the decline of the NWOBHM phenomenon and the chance to have a breakthrough in the US market prompted Girlschool to change their music, starting with the album Screaming Blue Murder in 1982. Their sound, following the success of Def Leppard's album Pyromania, became more polished with the introduction of keyboards on Play Dirty and veered toward hard rock and glam metal, losing the raw edge of their early works. "We were signed to an American label (...) there was a certain amount of pressure exerted on us to sound more American" was McAuliffe's explanation, speaking about the tame sound of the album Running Wild. The band appearance also changed to a more feminine and sophisticated style, imitating the successful American glam metal bands of the time and generally following the direction of the market. However, the failed attempt to create a niche for Girlschool in the US and the rapidly changing record market behaviour made the band change their mind and go back to their original sound, which they retain to this day. Girlschool's members themselves described their music in different ways, from "slapstick rock" to "raucous (...) heavy metal rock 'n' roll", and, even acknowledging the common origin of their music in the NWOBHM, they sometimes found it difficult to associate their songs to a single genre or subgenre of rock music.

Just like most punk songs, Girlschool's lyrics usually have short and direct texts, often reflecting the wild rock 'n' roll lifestyle and treating sex and romance as seen from a feminine point of view, with the use of reverse sexism and tongue-in-cheek sense of humour. Although many of their songs revolve around these topics, the band members themselves never resorted to sex appeal gimmickry: as Creem noted appreciatively in 1982, "Girlschool doesn't pimp their gender". Some of their songs deal also with more serious matters, such as exploitation and abuse of women, murder, addiction, the destruction of the environment, social and political issues.

== Reception ==
The fact of being a band composed of girls, beside the obvious marketing gimmick based on sexuality, has always been perceived as a handicap in the sexist and male-dominated heavy metal scene, especially in the early 1980s, when metal was rapidly taking the place of punk music in the tastes of many young males in Great Britain. However, Girlschool's musicianship and their aggressive but fun-loving attitude quickly won the NWOBHM audience, which treated them with respect, forming a loyal fan base. In Kelly Johnson's word, Girlschool were so well accepted because "most of the audience is headbangers and they spend most of the time banging their heads and hardly look at us".

We’re a bunch of fun-loving, ordinary people and that’s the image we always like to present.

— Kim McAuliffe

In 1980, Girlschool's fondest fans formed a club called 'The Barmy Army', which followed and supported the band during every tour in Great Britain and Europe. The fan club did not survive the decline of the band and almost ceased its activities by the end of 1982.

British specialized press took notice of the band and especially weekly magazines like Sounds and later Kerrang! dedicated covers to Girlschool and had frequent articles for either their stage performances or for their off-stage drinking bouts and 'no-nonsense attitude', during their period of maximum media exposition and chart success. In 1980, Sounds voted the band second 'Best Newcomer' and Kelly Johnson third 'Best Female Vocalist'. Two years later, Kerrang! still voted Kelly Johnson second 'Best Female Vocalist' and best 'Female Pin-up'. In that period, British radio stations gladly broadcast Girlschool's singles and the band was also guest of music TV shows, culminating with a performance at Top of the Pops in April 1981 to promote the single "Hit and Run".

On the contrary, Girlschool's change of musical style in 1984 and their sudden predilection for the US market were not well received by the British press and by their fans at home. The change of attitude and image, exemplified by the music video for "Running Wild" on rotation on MTV, which showed the girls playing with heavy make-up, combed hair and fancy costumes, imitating a trendy American glam outfit, alienated the love of British fans, whose perception of the band was still that of roughneck companions to Motörhead, instead of competitors of Mötley Crüe and Ratt. In the time span of two years, Girlschool passed from headliner act to having serious difficulty to find a gig in the UK: "Nobody seems to want us in Britain anymore", confessed McAuliffe to journalist Malcolm Dome in 1984. The return of Girlschool to the sound of their beginnings came too late to win back the large fan base of their heyday and the band fell to cult status already in the late 1980s.

== Legacy ==
Pete Makowski in an article of the August 1980 edition of Sounds defined Girlschool "the leading pioneers in the battle against sexism". However, even if Enid Williams showed an interest in feminism, the band never openly expressed opinions about female discrimination, happy to be appreciated simply as musicians instead of 'female musicians'. Nonetheless, being a successful all-female group in the macho heavy metal scene was a statement of sexual equality, as many reviewers remarked, arriving as far as to associate Girlschool with the American feminist Riot Grrrl movement.

Reviewers and critics have also often associated the production of recent all-female metal acts to the sound and music of Girlschool, identifying them as a band that, just like The Runaways before them, helped in paving the way to the presence of women in rock music. However, Williams remembered in 2004 how, in her experience, Girlschool were more inspirational for young male musicians than for female ones in starting rock bands. Moreover, important female metal bands of the 2000s, such as Crucified Barbara and Drain STH, denied even of knowing the music of Girlschool. Only the American all-female rock band The Donnas publicly acknowledged the influence of Girlschool on their music.

== Band members ==
Current

- Kim McAuliffe – rhythm guitar, lead and backing vocals (1978–present)
- Denise Dufort – drums (1978–present)
- Jackie Chambers – lead guitar, backing vocals (2000–present)
- Olivia Airey – bass guitar, backing vocals (2024–present)

== Discography ==
- Demolition (1980)
- Hit and Run (1981)
- Screaming Blue Murder (1982)
- Play Dirty (1983)
- Running Wild (1985)
- Nightmare at Maple Cross (1986)
- Take a Bite (1988)
- Girlschool (1992)
- 21st Anniversary: Not That Innocent (2002)
- Believe (2004)
- Legacy (2008)
- Hit and Run – Revisited (2011)
- Guilty as Sin (2015)
- WTFortyfive? (2023)

== Videography ==
- Play Dirty Live (1985)
- Girlschool - Live from London (2005)
- Around the World (2008)

== See also ==
- List of Girlschool band members
- List of new wave of British heavy metal bands
- All-female band
