= Marilyn Monroe in popular culture =

Marilyn Monroe's influence in popular culture

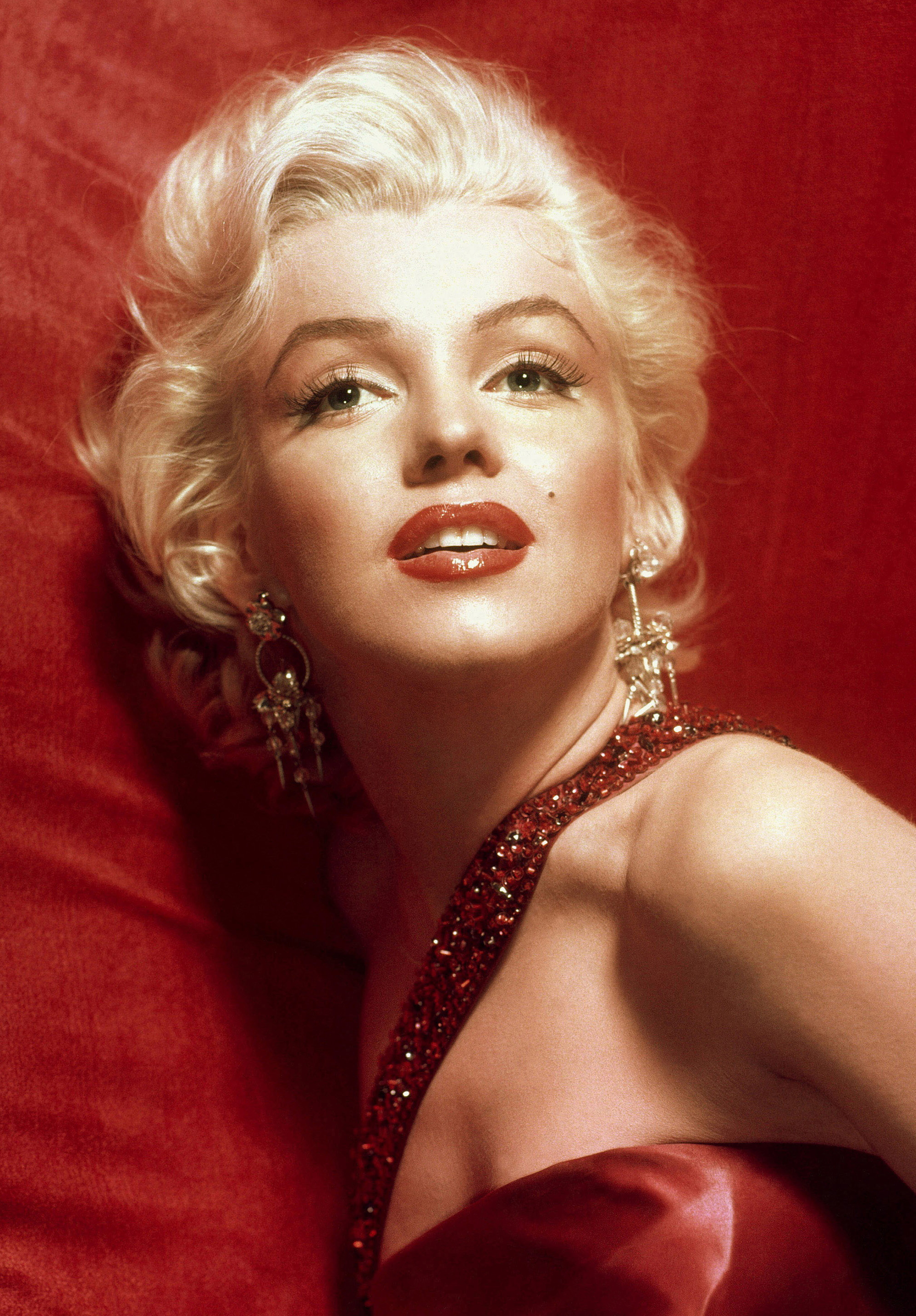
Monroe in a 1953 publicity still

American actress Marilyn Monroe's life and persona have inspired and influenced artists and celebrities in a variety of fields. Monroe's status as a sex icon, her suicide, and her perception as an embodiment of American identity led to her lasting influence.

== Film ==
Sherilyn Fenn played the character of "Candy Cane", a stripper in the 1992 film Ruby. The character is a composite of Monroe, Candy Barr, and Judith Exner.

== Fashion ==
Marilyn Monroe's fashion styles have inspired other artists. Monroe's white dress, which she wore for the film The Seven Year Itch (1955), has been emulated by various celebrities in photo shoots and during performances, and has been often referenced in advertisements. Its recreation in Blonde (2022) was difficult because the pleating technique used on the original dress was no longer in use. The white dress sold for $4.6 million in 2011. Monroe's pink dress inspired Madonna's outfit in her music video for "Material Girl" (1985).

== Theater ==
Marilyn! the Musical is a musical written by Mort Garson about Marilyn Monroe that was originally produced in London in 1983 as a vehicle for Stephanie Lawrence.

Marilyn: An American Fable is a musical based on a book by Patricia Michaels with music and lyrics by Jeanne Napoli, Doug Frank, Gary Portnoy, Beth Lawrence, and Norman Thalheimer. This allegedly "authorized" version (officially endorsed by acting coach Lee Strasberg's wife Anna), while based on events in the life of Monroe, was a highly fictionalized account, complete with a happy ending, set on a huge, vacant Hollywood soundstage.

Marilyn: Scenes from the '50s in two acts, is an opera by Lorenzo Ferrero set to a bilingual libretto by Floriana Bossi and the composer. Set in two spaces, one of which represents the personal life of Monroe and the other which depicts moments of American political and civic life, the story interweaves the myth and decline of the movie star up to her mysterious death, with accounts of significant past events: the Korean War, the McCarthy era investigations, the prosecution of Wilhelm Reich, and the lectures of Timothy Leary on the use of psychedelic drugs. Marilyn is seen as an involuntary victim of the mass culture of her time, a figure only superficially serene and optimistic, a heroine in spite of herself, whose contradictory personality is represented in twelve scenes, equally distributed in the two acts.

Marilyn and Ella is a 2008 play by Bonnie Greer, that is a musical drama about Monroe and Ella Fitzgerald.

Bombshell is a musical with music by Marc Shaiman and lyrics by Marc Shaiman and Scott Wittman based on the original fictitious musical from the first season of the NBC television series Smash; the musical tells the life story of Monroe.

== Critical interpretation ==
Monroe's influence was bolstered by her transformation from a "girl-next-door" persona to a sex icon. Because her death by suicide was unexpected, it further increased interest in her life. She also grew in fame during the civil rights movement and Cold War. Seen as an embodiment of American identity, Monroe's race and story brought comfort to people during those eras.

Her fame also grew immediately following World War II, when television ownership began rising, and the United States was experiencing an economic boom.

== See also ==
- Marilyn Monroe filmography
- Marilyn Monroe mural
