= Marilyn =

Marilyn may refer to:

== People ==
- Marilyn (given name)
- Marilyn (singer) (born 1962), English singer
- Marilyn Monroe (1926–1962), an American actress

== Places ==
- Marilyn (hill), a type of mountain or hill in the British Isles with a prominence above 150 m
- 1486 Marilyn, a main-belt asteroid

== Media ==
=== Films ===
- Marilyn (1953 film), directed by Wolf Rilla
- Marilyn (1963 film), a 1963 documentary
- Marilyn (2011 film), a 2011 romance film
- Marilyn (2018 film), a 2018 Argentine film
- Marilyn (opera), a 1980 opera by Lorenzo Ferrero

=== Related to Marilyn Monroe ===
- Marilyn: A Biography, a 1976 biography by Norman Mailer
- Marilyn: The Untold Story, a 1980 television film
- Marilyn: An American Fable, a 1983 musical by Patricia Michaels, Jeanne Napoli, et al.
- Marilyn! the Musical, a 1983 British musical that ran at the Adelphi Theatre
- Marilyn! The New Musical, a 2018 musical that ran at the Paris Theater in Las Vegas

=== Others ===
- Marilyn (Vanitas), a painting by Audrey Flack
- Marilyn (comics), a British comic published between 1955 and 1965
- "Marilyn", a 2000 horror short story by Jack Dann

== See also ==
- Marilyn Manson, an American singer
  - Marilyn Manson (band), an American rock band
- "Mary Lynne" (song), a 1980 song by the band Sector 27 on the album Sector 27
