= Play Dirty (album) =

Studio album by Girlschool
- Released: 8 November 1983
- Genre: Heavy metal
- Length: 40:14; 53:59 (re-issue)
- Labels: Bronze (UK); Mercury (U.S.)
- Producers: Noddy Holder, Jim Lea

Girlschool chronology
1-2-3-4 Rock and Roll (1983)	Play Dirty (1983)	Running Wild (1985)

Singles from Play Dirty
- 1. "20th Century Boy / Breaking All the Rules" Released: 7 October 1983; 2. "Burning in the Heat / Surrender" Released: January 1984

Play Dirty is the fourth studio album by British heavy metal band, Girlschool, released on Bronze Records in 1983 and produced by Noddy Holder and Jim Lea from the hard rock band Slade. It was the first Girlschool album not to enter the UK Top 40 album chart and signalled a general downturn in their career, along with an inclination towards a softer rock sound. Kelly Johnson left the band soon after the release and an intended full US-tour never materialised. In the UK, two singles were lifted from the album, each having a picture-sleeve:

- "20th Century Boy"/ "Breaking All the Rules" on 7-inch, the 12-inch adding "Like It Like That". "20th Century Boy" is a T. Rex cover.
- "Burning in the Heat"/ "Surrender" as both the 7-inch and 12-inch single release. (1984)

In 2005, Castle subsidiary Sanctuary Records re-issued the album on CD with songs from the EP 1-2-3-4 Rock and Roll and other compilations as bonus tracks, and extensive sleevenotes by Record Collector magazine's Joe Geesin.

Drummer Denise Dufort rated the album as her favourite of all the band's career: "Play Dirty as it has a more mature sound to it and I think it sounds a bit like Def Leppard, also Jim Lea and Noddy Holder from Slade produced it".

== Reception ==
Professional ratings
Review scores
Source	Rating
AllMusic	1.5/5 stars
Collector's Guide to Heavy Metal	5/10
Smash Hits	0/10

From contemporary reviews, Josephine Hocking wrote in Smash Hits called the album a "cliche-ridden Heavy Metal album" and noted that song like "Burning in the Heat" and "Play Dirty" proved "beyond any reasonable doubt that sexist lyrics and boring guitar solos can be done equally badly by women as by men."

== Track listing ==
Side one
No.	Title	Writer(s)	Length
1.	"Going Under"	Kim McAuliffe, Kelly Johnson	4:16
2.	"High & Dry" (Slade cover)	Jim Lea, Noddy Holder	3:10
3.	"Play Dirty"	McAuliffe, Johnson	5:04
4.	"20th Century Boy" (T. Rex cover)	Marc Bolan	3:28
5.	"Breaking All the Rules"	McAuliffe, Johnson, Gil Weston, Denise Dufort	3:03

Side two
No.	Title	Writer(s)	Length
6.	"Burning in the Heat" (Slade cover)	Lea, Holder	3:20
7.	"Surrender"	McAuliffe, Johnson	3:24
8.	"Rock Me Shock Me"	McAuliffe, Johnson, Weston, Dufort	4:28
9.	"Running for Cover"	McAuliffe, Johnson	3:12
10.	"Breakout (Knob in the Media)"	McAuliffe, Johnson, Weston, Dufort	3:23

2005 re-issue bonus tracks
No.	Title	Writer(s)	Length
11.	"1-2-3-4 Rock 'n' Roll"	Jeanne Napoli, Lesley Gore, Benjy King, Rick Blakemore	3:32
12.	"Don't Call It Love"	McAuliffe, Johnson	3:24
13.	"Tush" (ZZ Top cover)	Billy Gibbons, Dusty Hill, Frank Beard	2:13
14.	"Like It Like That"	McAuliffe, Johnson	3:28
15.	"1-2-3-4 Rock 'n' Roll" (12" extended version)		4:33

== Personnel ==
Band members

- Kim McAuliffe – rhythm guitar, lead vocals on tracks 3, 5, 7, 8, 9, 10, 11, 12, 13, 14
- Kelly Johnson – lead guitar, lead vocals on tracks 1, 2, 4, 6
- Gil Weston – bass, backing vocals
- Denise Dufort – drums

Additional musicians

- Lemmy – backing vocals
- Vicki Blue – backing vocals
- Don Garbutt – keyboards and explosions
- Mark Haircut – tambourine, backing vocals
- Paul Samson – handclaps and general noise

Production

- Produced by Noddy Holder and Jim Lea
- Mixed by Jim Lea

== Charts ==
Chart (1983)	Peak position
UK Albums (Official Charts)	66
UK Heavy Metal Albums (MRIB)	7
