= Hope and Keen =

British comedy double act

- Notable work: Comedy Bandbox; Hope and Keen's Crazy House; Hope and Keen's Crazy Bus; The Hope and Keen Scene

Comedy career
- Years active: 1956–1974
- Former members: Mike Hope; Albie Keen

Mike Hope
- Born: Michael Gerald Harrison; 17 June 1935; Birmingham, England
- Died: 12 April 2019 (aged 83); East Sussex, England
- Spouses: Ann Maureen Kennedy (1965–1970); Charlotte Howard (1975–?); Patricia Rosevar (1993–?)
- Children: 3

Albie Keen
- Born: Thomas Albert Henry Harrison; 4 June 1935; Belfast, Northern Ireland
- Died: 2 March 2020 (aged 84); Barbezieux-Saint-Hilaire, Charente, Nouvelle-Aquitaine, France
- Height: 1.55 m (5 ft 1 in)

Mike Hope (born Michael Gerard Harrison; 17 June 1935 – 12 April 2019) and Albie Keen (born Thomas Albert Henry Harrison; 4 June 1935 – 2 March 2020) were a British comedy double act. They were first cousins, the sons of British Variety comedians Syd and Max Harrison and first formed their act, as singers, dancers and acrobats, in 1956. They were the hosts of Hope and Keen's Crazy House and other British television and radio shows.

== History ==
In 1971 they were engaged for the West End show Meet Me In London at the Adelphi Theatre. This was a ten-week ‘fill-in’- put on by impresario Harold Fielding after Charlie Girl closed at short notice and he was getting together a production of Show Boat.

Hope and Keen had a spot in the first half. When the other star of this part of the show, Clodagh Rodgers, walked out fifteen minutes before curtain-up on the first night after one of her numbers was cut, they filled in for her for several nights before another singer (Susan Maughan) came in. They received positive reviews from the critics in this run, as they not only demonstrated a gift for comedy, but also played several instruments between them, and showed a flair for gymnastics. Physical comedy became the mainstay of their act, and a very impressive sword-dueling sequence became a signature skit in the act. They even had offers to be hired as stuntmen.

Both were members of the Grand Order of Water Rats. In 1979 they served as joint captains of the Variety Club of Great Britain's Golfing Society.

Hope died in 2019, aged 83. Keen died in France in 2020, aged 84.

== Television ==
- Comedy Bandbox (ABC for ITV, 1963–64)
- Hope and Keen's Crazy House (BBC1, 1971)
- Hope and Keen's Crazy Bus (BBC1, 1972)
- The Hope and Keen Scene (BBC1, 1974)
