= Marilyn! The New Musical =

Musical by Tegan Summer and Gregoy Nabours

Marilyn!
- The New Musical
- Music: Gregory Nabours
- Lyrics: Tegan Summer; Gregory Nabours
- Book: Tegan Summer
- Basis: The life of Marilyn Monroe
- Premiere: July 29, 2016: Alex Theatre, Glendale, California
- Productions: 2016 Glendale; 2018 Las Vegas

Marilyn! The New Musical, (also known as just Marilyn!) is a musical with a book by Tegan Summer, music by Gregoy Nabours, and lyrics by them both. It is based on the life of Marilyn Monroe, and utilizes people and events from the golden age of Hollywood.

Produced by Prospect House Entertainment, in collaboration with Caesars Entertainment, and Authentic Brands Group the brand management company that over sees Marilyn Monroe's estate. With direction by Summers and choreography by Ferly Prado, the original production of Marilyn! premiered in Las Vegas at the Paris Theater in June 2018, after early preview tryouts at Glendale's Alex Theatre for a one-night-only presentation. Its original stars included Kelley Jakle, from the Pitch Perfect franchise as Marilyn Monroe.

== Synopsis ==
Michelle is a young journalist from England researching Marilyn Monroe to commemorate the actress' 90th birthday. She visits Charlie Page, one of Marilyn's drivers, who is now living a life of solitude. Two stories emerge as Charlie bonds with Michelle he recalls Marilyn Monroe's phenomenal life in flashback and reveals the real reason behind his living as a recluse for over forty years.

== Cast ==
Character	2016 Alex Theatre	2018 Paris Theater
Norma Jeane	Kelley Dorney	Brittney Bertier
Marilyn Monroe	Kelley Jakle	Ruby Lewis
Michelle Morgan	Samantha Stewart	
Charlie Page		Frank Lawson
Milton Greene		Travis Cloer
Dorothy Dandridge	Tiana Oyoke	
Darryl F. Zanuck		Randal Keith
Joe DiMaggio		Christopher Showerman
Arthur Miller		Matthew Tyler
Jayne Mansfield		Una Eggerts
Bill Pursel		Chris Fore
Jane Russell		Lindsay Roginski
Ella Fitzgerald		Chanel Edwards-Frederick

== Musical numbers ==
Note: As the Playbill does not designate which act the musical numbers are featured in, the songs are simply listed here.

- "Norma Jean" – Charlie, Gladys, Grace, Norma Jean, Jimmy, Ensemble
- "This Could Be It!" - Norma Jean, Bill, Marilyn, Ensemble
- "My Heart Belongs to Daddy" - Marilyn, Ensemble
- "I Just Wanna Drive!" - Marilyn, Charlie, Ensemble
- "The Picture's Bigger Than The Girl" - Marilyn, Darryl Zanuck, Ensemble
- "Villa Nova" - Joe DiMaggio, Marilyn, Ensemble
- "The Time of My Life (I Deserve More)" - Marilyn
- "I Ain't Stoppin'!" - Ella Fitzgerald, Ensemble
- "You Belong to Me" - Marilyn, Darryl Zanuck, Ensemble
- "Someone Else Ago" - Marilyn, Bill
- "The Battle of the Blondes" - Marilyn, Jayne Mansfield, Ensemble
- "Don't Wanna Be Me" - Marilyn, Norma Jean
- "The Showgirl In The Spotlight (My, My, Marilyn)" - Marilyn, Milton Greene
- "We're Cemented" - Marilyn, Jane Russell
- "Happy Birthday, Mr. President" - Marilyn
- "I'm Not Saying Goodbye" - Company
- "Diamonds Are a Girl's Best Friend" - Company

== Productions ==
=== Glendale, California ===
The brain-child of Tegan Summer, CEO of Prospect House Entertainment, Marilyn!, was produced by Prospect House in association with Glendale Arts Productions and premiered at the Alex Theatre in Glendale California.

=== Las Vegas ===
In 2017, a condensed version of the show, which ran about 90-minutes, was put on for prospective investors at The Space in Las Vegas.

In April 2018, it was announced that Tegan Summer would be bringing Marilyn! The New Musical to Las Vegas, with a projected opening date of May 23, at the Paris Theater. It was revealed actress Ruby Lewis would be starring as the titular character. The show opened to mixed reviews, and after less than a month, it was revealed the show would close on June 29, 2018, with plans to reopen September 4. This hiatus was to give producers time to rework the show, but Marilyn never reopened.

== Response ==
=== Critical reception ===
After its one-night-only performance at the Alex Theatre in Glendale, California, audience reaction was generally positive. Following the sold out event, and positive reactions, Prospect House Entertainment announced encore performances in Beverly Hills, Las Vegas, Beijing, and Shanghai.

The Las Vegas production opened on June 1, 2018, to mixed reviews from theatre critics. However, Lewis received widespread acclaim for her performances as Marilyn. The Las Vegas Sun gave the Paris Theater production of Marilyn! very positive reviews, with Brock Radke saying, "...the grand opening performance... was a rapid-fire affair, bouncing from song to song with roller-coaster momentum and an extraordinary amount of emotion from a gifted cast anchored by Ruby Lewis as Marilyn." Conversely, Mike Weatherford from Nevada NPR called the show, "...half-baked," going on to say, "this mediocre musical doesn’t even give casual fans the screen Marilyn: The sex appeal balanced by a sweetness and vulnerability that made men want to protect as well as possess."

== See also ==
- Bombshell
- Marilyn! the Musical
- Marilyn: An American Fable
