= Jodi Benson =

American actress (born 1961)

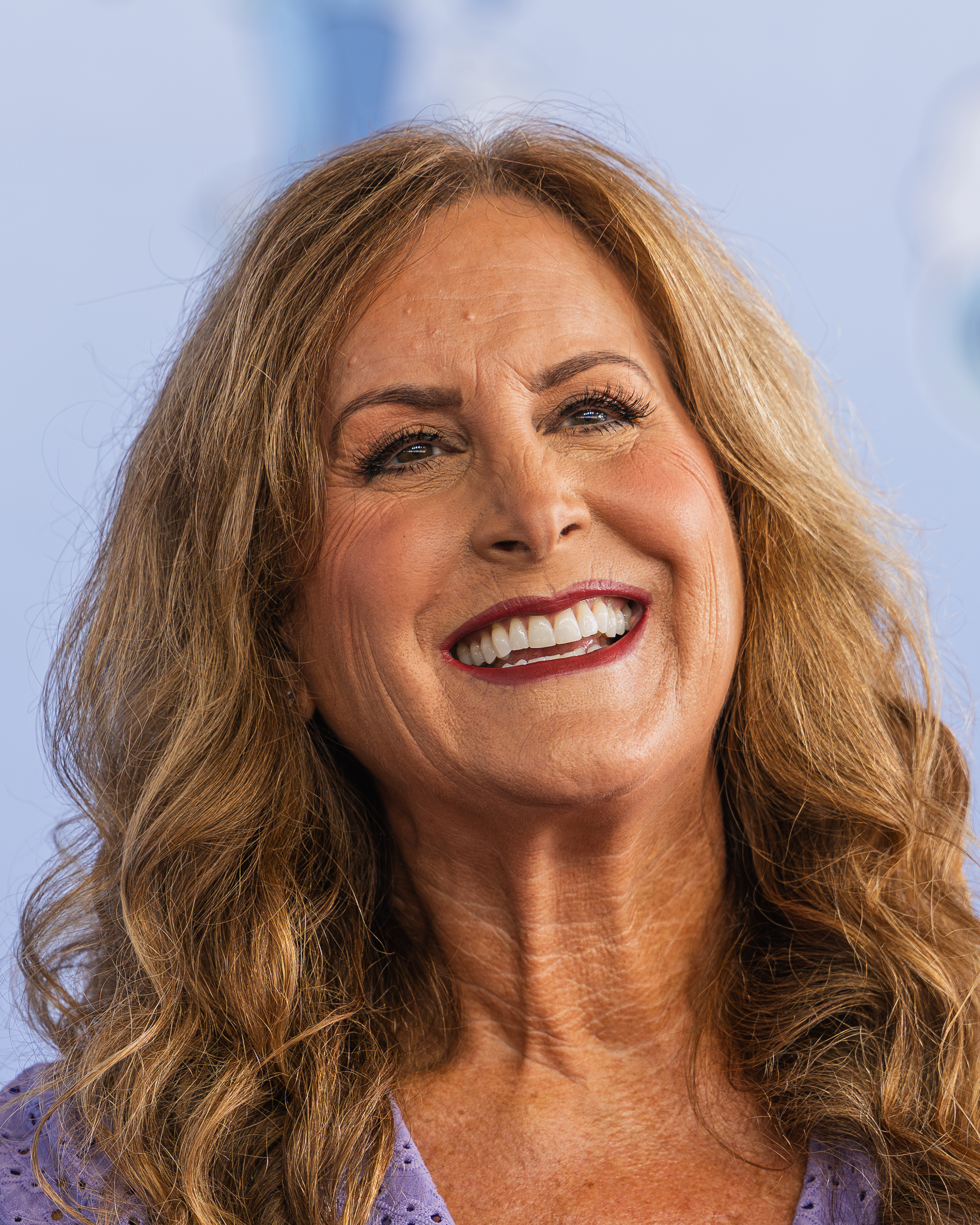
- Benson at GalaxyCon Nashville in 2026
- Born: Jodi Marzorati; October 10, 1961 (age 65); Rockford, Illinois, U.S.
- Other name: Suzetta Miñet
- Education: Millikin University
- Occupations: Actress; singer
- Years active: 1982–present
- Spouse: Ray Benson (m. 1984)
- Children: 2
- Awards: Disney Legend (2011)

Jodi Benson (née Marzorati; born October 10, 1961) is an American actress and singer. She is best known for providing the voice of Ariel in Disney's The Little Mermaid (1989), as well as in its sequel, prequel, and television series spin-off, along with many other Disney works. Benson is also known for her portrayal of Barbie in the second and third films of the Toy Story franchise (1999, 2010), and in the Toy Story Toons short Hawaiian Vacation (2011). For her contributions to Disney, Benson was named a "Disney Legend" in 2011.

Benson was born and raised in a Catholic family. She graduated from Boylan Central Catholic High School in Rockford, Illinois, and Millikin University in Decatur, Illinois.

Benson's other notable voice roles in Disney projects include Weebo in Flubber (1997), Belle (taking over for Paige O'Hara) in House of Mouse (2001–03), Lady (who was originally voiced by Barbara Luddy) in Lady and the Tramp II: Scamp's Adventure (2001) and Anita Radcliffe (originally voiced by Lisa Davis) in 101 Dalmatians II: Patch's London Adventure (2003); she also appeared as Sam in the live-action Disney film Enchanted (2007). Outside of Disney, Benson's film credits include Don Bluth's Thumbelina (1994), Balto II: Wolf Quest (2002), and Balto III: Wings of Change (2004); on television, she voiced the character of Tula in Hanna-Barbera's The Pirates of Dark Water (1991–93), and Jane Doe and Patsy Smiles in Cartoon Network's Camp Lazlo (2005–08). In video games, Benson provided the voice of EVA in the Metal Gear series (2004–10), performing under the pseudonym Suzetta Miñet.

== Career ==
Benson made her debut in the 1983 Kenny Ortega-directed Marilyn: An American Fable. She was introduced to Alan Menken around 1985, during an audition for Kick, which never was produced. Other Broadway credits include a starring role in the 1986 Broadway musical Smile, where she introduced a song called "Disneyland". In 1987, Howard Ashman, the lyricist of Smile, would go on to write the lyrics for The Little Mermaid. She describes the song "Disneyland" at the "Smile" Reunion concert held on September 22, 2014, "This is the first piece of the puzzle of my life, the first step of the journey, so to speak". Benson also sings "Disneyland" on a compilation CD called Unsung Musicals. In 1989, Benson appeared in the Broadway musical Welcome to the Club, alongside Samuel E. Wright, who performed the voice for Sebastian the Crab in The Little Mermaid.

In 1992, Benson received a Tony Award nomination for Best Actress in a Musical for her role as Polly Baker in Crazy For You. She played the narrator in Joseph And The Amazing Technicolor Dreamcoat in 1998.

In 2004, Benson voiced the character of EVA in the video game Metal Gear Solid 3: Snake Eater. Due to her association with children-oriented projects, she was advised by voice director Kris Zimmerman to adopt a pseudonym for the game; her credited name, "Suzetta Miñet", was coined by Zimmerman based on the name of Benson's pet dog during her childhood, Suzette Monet. For two decades after the game's release, Miñet's true identity was the subject of scrutiny and speculation among fans until Benson officially revealed her involvement during the promotion of the game's remake, Metal Gear Solid Delta: Snake Eater, in November 2024.

In 2004–06, Benson contributed as the host and narrator of the children's Christian home video series called "Baby Faith", created by Integrity Publishers & FamilyTreeMedia.

In 2007, Benson played the secretary Sam in Disney's live-action/animated film, Enchanted. Benson also played the Queen in a one-night concert version of Rodgers & Hammerstein's Cinderella at the Nashville Symphony Orchestra in May 2010.

Benson was at the 2012 SYTA conference singing her signature song "Part of Your World" on August 27, 2012.

Benson joined the "2013 Spring Pops" on May 14–15, 2013 as a guest soloist with the Boston Pops. She has been a frequent celebrity narrator at Disney's Candlelight Processional at Walt Disney World, appearing most recently in 2016, 2017, 2018, and 2021.

Benson can be heard on over a dozen recordings. Her animated TV series include the Emmy Award-winning Camp Lazlo for Cartoon Network, The Little Mermaid, Batman Beyond, The Grim Adventures of Billy & Mandy, The Wild Thornberrys, Barbie, Hercules: Zero to Hero, P. J. Sparkles, and the series Sofia the First for Disney.

On the concert stage, Benson has performed as a concert soloist with symphonies all over the world, including The Boston Pops, The Philly Pops (conductor: Peter Nero), The Hollywood Bowl Orchestra (conductor: John Mauceri), The National Symphony (conductor: Marvin Hamlisch), Cleveland, Dallas, Tokyo, and the San Francisco and Chicago Symphonies. She starred in the Kennedy Center Honors for Ginger Rogers, and in Disney's Premiere in Central Park with Pocahontas, The Walt Disney World 25th Anniversary Spectacular and Disney's 100 Years of Magic. Benson is the resident guest soloist for the Walt Disney Company/Disney Cruise Line and ambassador for feature animation.

On June 6, 2016, Benson performed the role of Ariel at the Hollywood Bowl's concert performance of The Little Mermaid. She also made a special appearance in ABC's 2019 live musical spectacular The Little Mermaid Live! Benson was originally going to reprise her role as Sam in the 2022 film Disenchanted, but her scene was cut from the movie. She recently lent her voice to Ariel in the 2022 video game Disney Dreamlight Valley as well as singing as Ariel on various Disney Princess albums of the 2000s. From 1992 to 2011 she was the official voice of Barbie for Mattel and Pixar for projects such as Toy Story and Dance! Workout with Barbie, until the role was taken over by Kate Higgins starting with the series Life in the Dreamhouse.

In June 2023, Benson starred as Mama Rose in a concert production of Gypsy alongside her daughter Delany at the Barbara B. Mann Performing Arts Hall in Fort Myers, Florida. The two of them reprised their roles in a 2025 production at the OFC Creations Theatre Center in Rochester, New York. Benson portrayed Dolly Gallagher Levi in a concert production of Hello, Dolly! at the Dr. Phillips Center for the Performing Arts in Orlando, Florida from June 21-22, 2024 and also portrayed the Witch in their 2026 production of Into the Woods.

=== The Little Mermaid ===
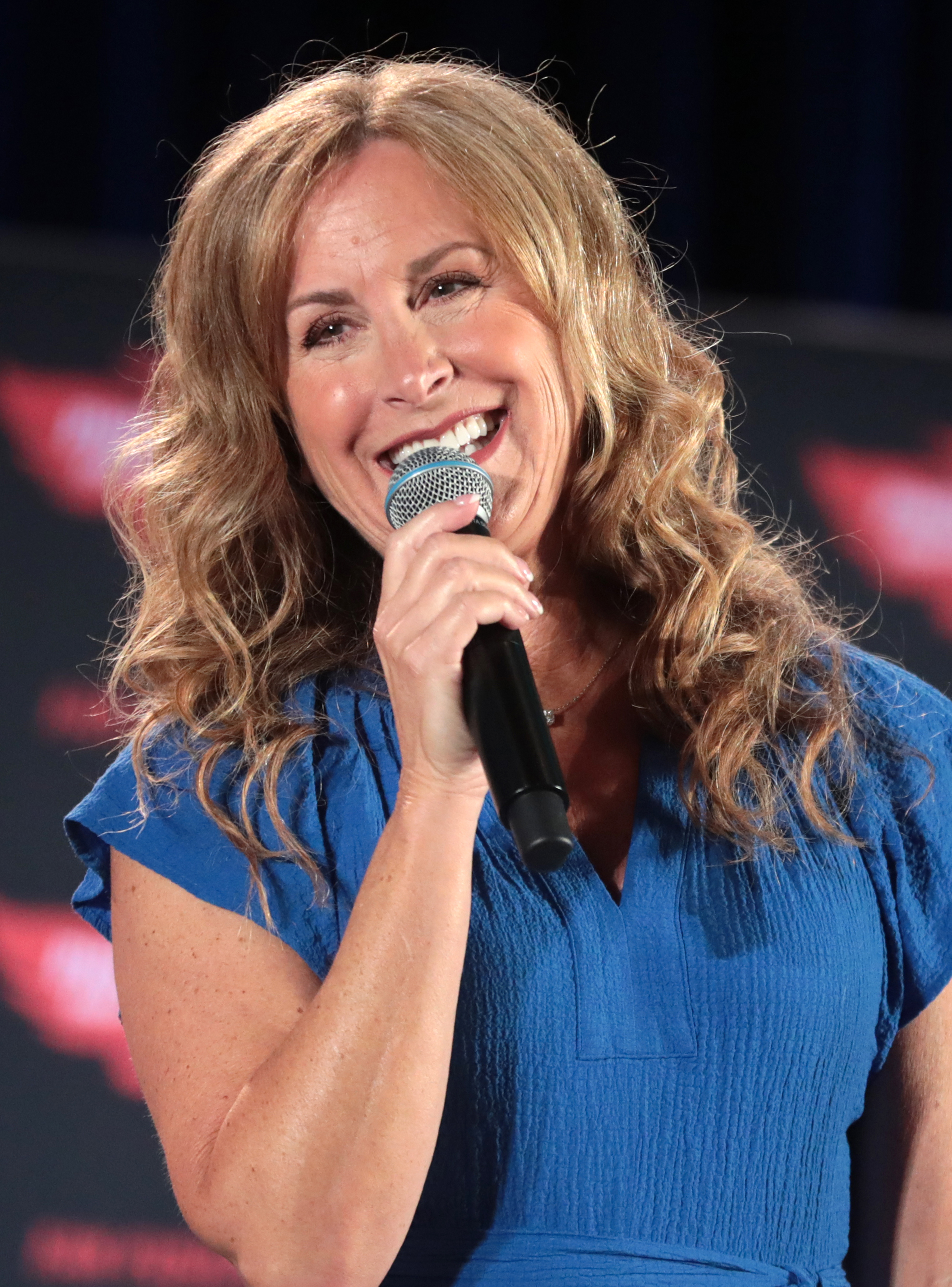
Benson performing "Part of Your World" at the 2022 Phoenix Fan Fusion

In late 1986, Benson first heard of the audition for The Little Mermaid through lyricist and playwright Howard Ashman. The two had just worked together in the Broadway show Smile until its run ended early. Ashman knew she would be the perfect fit for the role and that she would be a great replica of Ariel. After hearing the demo for "Part of Your World", she sang a small part of it on tape where it was later sent to Disney executives. Before her audition for The Little Mermaid, she was primarily a stage actress. It was Ashman's first Disney project. In early 1988, Benson won the role of Ariel and has been voicing her ever since. Benson also made a cameo in the 2023 live-action adaptation of the film, directed by Rob Marshall, as a market vendor who hands Ariel (Halle Bailey) a fork during her tour of the kingdom.

== Personal life ==
Benson dated actor Ray Benson while experiencing a religious conversion. They got married in 1984, and had two children, a son (born 1999) and a daughter (born 2001). An article originally published in 2013 said the couple "live north of Atlanta, GA." In May 2024, Benson revealed to 11 Alive News in connection with her upcoming appearance at MomoCon in Atlanta that she lives in the Lake Lanier area.

== Filmography ==
=== Film ===
Year	Title	Role	Notes	Ref.
1989	The Little Mermaid	Ariel Vanessa (voice)		
1992	Dance! Workout with Barbie	Barbie (voice)	Direct-to-video	
1994	Thumbelina	Thumbelina (voice)		
1997	Flubber	Weebo (voice)		
1997	A Christmas Carol	Belle (voice)		
1998	The Mighty Kong	Ann Darrow (voice)	Direct-to-video	
1999	Toy Story 2	Barbie (voice)		
1999	The Crippled Lamb	Abigail Laura Lamb Mary (voice)	Direct-to-video	
2000	The Little Mermaid II: Return to the Sea	Ariel (voice)	Direct-to-video	
2000	Joseph: King of Dreams	Asenath (voice)	Direct-to-video	
2001	Lady and the Tramp II: Scamp's Adventure	Lady (voice)	Direct-to-video	
2002	Balto: Wolf Quest	Jenna (voice)	Direct-to-video	
2002	Rapsittie Street Kids: Believe in Santa	Lenee (voice)	Television film	
2003	101 Dalmatians II: Patch's London Adventure	Anita Radcliffe (voice)	Direct-to-video	
2003	K10C: Kids' Ten Commandments	Leila Martha (voice)		
2004	Nausicaä of the Valley of the Wind	Lastelle's Mother (voice)	English American version	
2004	Balto III: Wings of Change	Jenna (voice)	Direct-to-video	
2004–2006	Baby Faith: God Made Me (video series)	Herself (narrator)	Integrity Publishing	
2007	Enchanted	Sam		
2008	The Little Mermaid: Ariel's Beginning	Ariel (voice)	Direct-to-video	
2010	Toy Story 3	Barbie (voice)		
2011	The Little Engine That Could	Jillian (voice)	Direct-to-video	
2012	Secret of the Wings	Healing-Talent Fairy (voice)		
2018	Ralph Breaks the Internet	Ariel (voice)		
2022	The Boss Baby: Christmas Bonus	LaLa Doo-Da (voice)		
2023	The Little Mermaid	Market Vendor	Cameo appearance	
2023	Once Upon a Studio	Ariel (voice)	Short film	
2026	Hexed	Cursula (voice)		
2026	Holiday Ever After: A Disney World Wish Come True	Leira	Television film, cameo	

=== Television ===
Year	Title	Role	Notes
1991	Hunter	Police officer	Episode: "Cries of Silence"
1991–1993	The Pirates of Dark Water	Tula (voice)	21 episodes
1992	P. J. Sparkles	P.J. (voice)	Television special
1992–1994	The Little Mermaid	Princess Ariel (voice)	31 episodes
1995–1996	Guideposts Junction	Herself	A six-park Christian video series for children
1997	Caroline in the City	Mother	Episode: "Caroline and the Egg"
1998	Pepper Ann	Amber O'Malley (voice)	Episode: "Green Eyed Monster"
1998–1999	Hercules	Helen of Troy (voice)	10 episodes
2000	The Wild Thornberrys	Mother Cheetah (voice)	Episode: "Cheetahs Never Prosper"
2000	Batman Beyond	Aquagirl (voice)	Episode: "The Call"
2001–2003	House of Mouse	Ariel Belle (voice)	3 episodes
2003	The Brotherhood of Poland, New Hampshire	Choir Soloist	Episode: "Sleeping Lions"
2003–2004	Duck Dodgers	Captain Tortelli Princess Incense (voice)	2 episodes
2004–2006	The Grim Adventures of Billy & Mandy	Blue Fairy Additional voices	3 episodes
2005–2008	Camp Lazlo	Patsy Smiles Ms. Jane Doe Almondine (voice)	21 episodes
2011	Toy Story Toons	Barbie (voice)	Episode: "Hawaiian Vacation"
2013, 2018	Sofia the First	Ariel Queen Emmaline (voice)	2 episodes
2015	Star vs. the Forces of Evil	Singing Teacher (voice)	Episode: "St. Olga's Reform School for Wayward Princesses"
2016	Clarence	Diana (voice)	Episode: "The Tails of Mardrynia"
2019	The Little Mermaid Live!	Herself	Television special
2022–present	The Wingfeather Saga	Nia Igiby Wingfeather (voice)	Main role
2022	The Loud House	Tammy Gobblesworth (voice)	Episode: "Flip This Flip"
2023	Lego Disney Princess: The Castle Quest	Princess Ariel (voice)	Television special
2025	Sweet Magnolias	Iris Maddox	Recurring role
2025	Lego Disney Princess: Villains Unite	Ariel (voice)	Television special
2026	Ariel	Marina Neptina (voice)	Guest starring

=== Video games ===
Year	Title	Voice role	Notes	Ref.
1997	Disney's Animated Storybook	Princess Ariel		
1998	A Bug's Life	Atta	Replacing Julia Louis-Dreyfus	
1999	Disney's Arcade Frenzy	Princess Ariel		
2000	Grandia II	Millenia Reena		
2000	Disney's Aladdin in Nasira's Revenge	Nasira		
2002	Kingdom Hearts	Princess Ariel	English American version	
2004	Metal Gear Solid 3: Snake Eater	EVA	English American version credited as "Suzetta Miñet"	
2004	Onimusha 3: Demon Siege	Mother		
2005	Kingdom Hearts II	Princess Ariel	English American version	
2007	Disney Princess: Enchanted Journey	Princess Ariel		
2010	Metal Gear Solid: Peace Walker	EVA	English American version Credited as "Suzetta Miñet"	
2011	Kinect: Disneyland Adventures	Princess Ariel		
2012	Disney Princess: My Fairytale Adventure	Princess Ariel		
2022	Disney Dreamlight Valley	Princess Ariel		
2024	Disney Speedstorm	Princess Ariel		
2025	Metal Gear Solid Delta: Snake Eater	EVA	English American version credited as "Suzetta Miñet"	

=== Theme parks ===
Year	Title	Voice role
2003	Mickey's PhilharMagic	Princess Ariel
2011	The Little Mermaid: Ariel's Undersea Adventure	Princess Ariel

== Stage ==
Year	Title	Role(s)	Notes	Ref.
1982	Joseph and the Amazing Technicolor Dreamcoat	Ensemble		
1983	Marilyn: An American Fable	Factory Girl Ensemble	Broadway debut	
1984	Sophisticated Ladies	Performer		
1986	Smile	Doria Hudson		
1988	Dangerous Music	Performer		
1989	Welcome to the Club	Betty Bursteter		
1990	Chess	Florence		
1992	Crazy for You	Polly Baker		
1998	Joseph and the Amazing Technicolor Dreamcoat	Narrator		
2024	Hello, Dolly!	Dolly Levi Gallagher		
2025	Gypsy	Mama Rose		
2026	Pen Pals	Performer	March 2026	
2026	Into the Woods	The Witch	July 2026	

== Discography ==
Year	Album	Notes
1989	The Little Mermaid: Original Motion Picture Soundtrack	
1990	Sebastian from The Little Mermaid	
1991	Precious Moments: Timmy's Gift	Performed the song Starlight Theme
1991	Jodi Benson Sings Songs From the Beginner's Bible I	
1992	Jodi Benson Sings Songs From the Beginner's Bible II	
1992	The Little Mermaid: Songs from the Sea	
1992	Crazy for You Cast Recording	
1993	The Little Mermaid: Splash Hits	
1994	Unsung Musicals	
1994	Thumbelina: Original Motion Picture Soundtrack	
1995	Songs of Guideposts Junction	
1996	Hollywood Christmas	Various artists
2000	Songs from The Little Mermaid II: Return to the Sea & More!	
2004	Disney Princess: The Ultimate Song Collection	
2004	Disney Princess Music Hits	
2005	Disney's Princess Christmas Album	
2005	Disney Princess Tea Party	
2006	Ultimate Disney Princess	

== Awards and nominations ==
Year (Note: Indicates the year of ceremony. Each year is linked to the article about the awards held that year, wherever possible.)	Award	Category	Title	Result
1992	Tony Award	Best Actress in a Musical	Crazy for You	Nominated
2001	Annie Awards	Outstanding Individual Achievement for Voice Acting by a Female Performer in an Animated Feature Production	Lady and the Tramp II: Scamp's Adventure	Nominated
2011	Disney Legend Award	Animation Voice	The Little Mermaid	Won
2011	EDA Female Focus Awards	Best Animated Female	Toy Story 3	Nominated
