= 1-2-3-4 Rock and Roll =

EP by Girlschool
- Released: August 1983
- Genre: Heavy metal
- Length: 12:58
- Label: Bronze
- Producer: Ritchie Cordell and Glen Kolotkin, Chris Tsangarides

Girlschool chronology
Screaming Blue Murder (1982)	1-2-3-4 Rock and Roll (1983)	Play Dirty (1983)

Professional ratings
Review scores
Source	Rating
AllMusic	1/5 stars

1-2-3-4 Rock and Roll is an EP produced by British heavy metal band, Girlschool. It was released in 1983 by Bronze Records, in an attempt to boost the declining sales of the band and launch the upcoming new album Play Dirty. The title track was produced by Ramones' producers Ritchie Cordell and Glen Kolotkin, who completed with samples the recording process that the band refused to carry on. The same song was released by the American band Rail the same year.

"Tush" is a re-recording of the ZZ Top song the band already covered on Hit and Run, with Kim McAuliffe on vocals instead of Enid Williams. "Don't Call It Love" is also a re-recording of the song already present in the Wildlife EP and in the album Screaming Blue Murder. Both songs were produced by Chris Tsangarides. Bronze issued also a 7-inch single with a shorter version of the title track and without the song "Emergency".

== Track listing ==
No.	Title	Writer(s)	Length
1.	"1-2-3-4 Rock and Roll"	Jeanne Napoli, Lesley Gore, Benjy King, Rick Blakemore	4:32
2.	"Tush"	Billy Gibbons, Dusty Hill, Frank Beard	2:13
3.	"Don't Call It Love"	Kim McAuliffe, Kelly Johnson	3:23
4.	"Emergency"	Enid Williams, Johnson, McAuliffe, Denise Dufort	2:50

== Personnel ==
- Kim McAuliffe – rhythm guitar, lead vocals
- Kelly Johnson – lead guitar, vocals
- Gil Weston – bass, vocals
- Denise Dufort – drums
