= Jeannette Charles =

British actress (1927–2024)

- Born: Jeannette Dorothea Louise Clark; 15 October 1927; London, England
- Died: 2 June 2024 (aged 96); Great Baddow, Essex, England
- Occupation: Actress
- Years active: 1972–2014
- Known for: Resemblance to Queen Elizabeth II
- Spouse: Ken Charles (m. 1957; died 1997)
- Children: 3

Jeannette Dorothea Louise Charles (née Clark; October 15, 1927–2 June 2024) was a British actress noted for her portrayals of Queen Elizabeth II, branding her "the Queen's most famous lookalike."

== Background ==
Jeannette Clark was born in Marylebone, London, in 1927. Her father, Alfred, was a restaurateur, and her mother, who was born Yetta Wonsoff, was a Dutch immigrant originally from Poland. Clark was noted for her resemblance to then-Princess Elizabeth as early as age eleven. She had always aspired to an acting career, but could not afford the cost of attending Royal Academy of Dramatic Art. When appearing in theatrical plays, she had trouble getting audiences to overlook her similarity to Elizabeth. She instead became an au pair in the United States, living in Midland, Texas, in the early 1950s. While there, she met Ken Charles, a fellow British expat who was working as an oil engineer; they married in 1957 and lived across North America, South America, and Africa as part of his job, before returning to the United Kingdom from Libya in 1969.

== Career ==
Charles and her family settled in Essex. In 1972, a painting she commissioned of herself in her forties (as a present for her husband) was displayed by the artist at the Royal Academy in London, where it was taken to be a portrait of the Queen. On the assumption the painting was of the Queen, it was disqualified as portraits displayed in the Academy had to be painted from life and it was assumed Elizabeth had not sat for the portrait. When it was revealed the portrait was of Charles and not Elizabeth, Charles (as the actual subject of the painting) received a great deal of press attention. She started receiving offers to portray the Queen in print advertisements. After studying the Queen's voice, as well as her appearance, Charles began making in-character personal appearances at trade shows and corporate events, and soon broadened into film. Charles played the role of Queen Elizabeth II in many films including Secrets of a Superstud (1976), Queen Kong (1976), The Rutles' movie All You Need Is Cash (1978), National Lampoon's European Vacation (1985), The Naked Gun: From the Files of Police Squad! (1988) and Austin Powers in Goldmember (2002). Foreign governments hired her to stand in for the Queen during preparations for state visits, to allow officials to rehearse protocol. Charles was a monarchist and refused offers she felt would be disreputable to the Queen as well as herself, such as declining to pose for a Playboy centrefold. Once, when invited to an event in which Queen Elizabeth the Queen Mother would also be present, she did not agree to appear until she received confirmation from Clarence House that the Queen Mother would not be offended. Charles also appeared as a semi-regular in Spike Milligan's Q series on BBC Television and Channel 4's Big Brother 10 to surprise the Brazilian contestant Rodrigo Lopes (who thought he was meeting the real Queen Elizabeth II for a task). Charles also appeared in Saturday Night Live episode Season 2, Episode 20 in 1977 and Mind Your Language episode Season 2, Episode 2, "Queen for a Day," in 1978. She published a memoir in 1986.

== Later life and death ==
Charles retired in 2014 and lived in Danbury, Essex. She died in a Great Baddow care home on June 2, 2024 at the age of 96. Her husband Ken, with whom she had three children, had died in 1997.

== Partial filmography ==
- Leos Leiden (1976) – The Queen
- Secrets of a Superstud (1976) – The Lady
- Queen Kong (1977) – HM The Queen (uncredited)
- Mind Your Language (1977) – Mrs. Baxter
- All You Need Is Cash (or The Rutles) (1978) – A Queen of England
- National Lampoon's European Vacation (1985) – Queen Elizabeth
- Nipagesh Bachof (1987) – Queen of England
- The Naked Gun: From the Files of Police Squad! (1988) – Queen Elizabeth II
- The Parent Trap (1998) – Queen Elizabeth II (deleted scene)
- Tusenårsfesten (1999) – Queen Elizabeth II
- Austin Powers in Goldmember (2002) – Queen Elizabeth II
