= Mary Barclay =

English actress (1916–2008)

- Born: Mary Biddulph; 20 July 1916; Williton, Somerset, England
- Died: 19 February 2008 (aged 91); Guernsey, Channel Islands

Mary Barclay (20 July 1916 – 19 February 2008) was an English film, television and theatre actress. She was best known for playing Stella Dane in the Crossroads television series, as well as her role in the 1973 film, A Touch of Class.

== Early life ==
Barclay was born Mary Biddulph in Williton, Somerset, England. She earned a double first from Cambridge University in Classics.

She applied to the Civil Service Board, but was turned down for the position. Afterwards she moved in with the mother of Ivor Novello in London. Novello's mother taught Barclay how to play the piano and sing. In return, Barclay agreed to take out her gin bottles. She worked at the landmark HMV music store on Oxford Street in London during this time.

Barclay enrolled in the Guildhall School of Music and Drama around the outbreak of the Second World War. She married Richard Barclay, who later became a BBC film editor, in 1940.

== Career ==
The couple emigrated to Canada after the war. There she landed her first acting role in the 1948 Canadian drama, Sins of the Fathers. Barclay next played a prostitute in the Canadian opening of the play, Tit-Coq (Little Rooster), beginning in 1948. She remained as a cast member of the play for three years.

Barclay made her Broadway in New York in The Hollow by Agatha Christie. Her success in The Hollow led to other Broadway roles and appearances on American television shows, including Florence Nightingale. In 1955 she appeared in Witness for the Prosecution at the Henry Miller Theatre in New York City.

Barclay and her husband returned to Great Britain in 1956, where she continued to act in film, stage and television. She was cast in the Crossroads television series as Stella Dane, an overbearing mother-in-law during the 1960s. She continued on Crossroads for 18 months before becoming bored with the role. She asked the show's producers to kill off her character, which they did.

She later appeared as Jon Voight's mother in The Revolutionary in 1970. She also acted in the controversial Sex and the Other Woman in 1972. Sex and the Other Woman was cut by nine minutes because British censors objected to material in the film.

Barlay was cast in the 1973 film, A Touch of Class, opposite Glenda Jackson and George Segal. Her other credits included roles in Dixon of Dock Green, Steptoe and Son, Spy Trap and Secret Army. She played Sophie Chantal in Secret Army, which was set in Belgium during World War II, from 1977 until 1979.

== Death ==
Mary Barclay died on 19 February 2008 at a nursing home in Guernsey at the age of 91. She had suffered from complications from a stroke which occurred seven years before her death.

Her first husband, Richard Barclay, had died from a heart attack in 1985. She married her second husband, David Taylor, a Scottish widower, in 1987.
