= Against the Day (Cronin novel) =

1999 historical novel by Michael Cronin

- Author: Michael Cronin
- Language: English
- Genre: Teen novel
- Published: 1999 (Oxford University Press)
- Publication place: United Kingdom
- Media type: Print (hardcover)
- Pages: 224 pp
- ISBN: 0192752677
- Followed by: Through the Night

Against the Day is a 1999 historical novel by Michael Cronin. The story is set after the end of World War II in a United Kingdom that has fallen under Nazi occupation. It follows the adventures of two boys who become dangerously involved in a secret resistance movement. A sequel, Through the Night, was published in 2003. A third book in the series, In the Morning, was published in 2005. It was shortlisted for the Angus Book Award.
