= Ultimate Disney Princess =

Compilation album by Various artists
- Released: September 18, 2006
- Recorded: 1937–2005
- Label: Walt Disney

Ultimate Disney Princess is a three-disc compilation album set consisting of a wide range of popular Disney songs, mainly those sung by or related to the Disney Princesses.

The first disc consists of 26 songs that are from the films or originally produced for the Disney Princess franchise. The second disc is made up of instrumental versions of 14 select songs. Finally, the set has a third "bonus disc", which is made up of 16 various covers of select songs by various artists such as Aly & AJ and Christy Carlson Romano, some of which originate from the Disneymania line of CDs.

The album was released in the United Kingdom on September 18, 2006, through EMI and Walt Disney Records.

== Track listing ==
=== Disc one ===
1. "A Whole New World" - Brad Kane and Lea Salonga (from Aladdin)
2. "Reflection" - Lea Salonga (from Mulan)
3. "Part of Your World" - Jodi Benson (from The Little Mermaid)
4. "A Dream Is a Wish Your Heart Makes" - Ilene Woods (from Cinderella)
5. "Beauty and the Beast" - Angela Lansbury (from Beauty and the Beast)
6. "Can You Feel the Love Tonight" - Kristle Edwards, Joseph Williams, Sally Dworsky, Nathan Lane, and Ernie Sabella (from The Lion King)
7. "Once Upon a Dream" - Mary Costa (from Sleeping Beauty)
8. "I'm Wishing/One Song" - Adriana Caselotti and Harry Stockwell (from Snow White and the Seven Dwarfs)
9. "Kiss the Girl" - Samuel E. Wright (from The Little Mermaid)
10. "I Won't Say (I'm in Love)" - Susan Egan (from Hercules)
11. "Colors of the Wind" - Judy Kuhn (from Pocahontas)
12. "If You Can Dream" - Susan Stevens Logan, Christie Hauser, Jodi Benson, Paige O'Hara, Lea Salonga, and Judy Kuhn
13. "He's a Tramp" - Peggy Lee (from Lady and the Tramp)
14. "For a Moment" - Tara Strong and Jodi Benson (from The Little Mermaid II: Return to the Sea)
15. "Forget About Love" - Gilbert Gottfried and Liz Callaway (from The Return of Jafar)
16. "A Spoonful of Sugar" - Julie Andrews (from Mary Poppins)
17. "Some Day My Prince Will Come" - Adriana Caselotti (from Snow White and the Seven Dwarfs)
18. "So This Is Love" - Ilene Woods and Mike Douglas (from Cinderella)
19. "Just Around the Riverbend" - Judy Kuhn (from Pocahontas)
20. "Every Girl Can Be a Princess" - Susan Egan
21. "I Wonder" - Mary Costa (from Sleeping Beauty)
22. "With a Smile and a Song" - Adriana Caselotti (from Snow White and the Seven Dwarfs)
23. "Something There" - Paige O'Hara, Angela Lansbury, Jerry Orbach, Robby Benson, and David Ogden Stiers (from Beauty and the Beast)
24. "Waiting For My Prince" - Lesley French
25. "Out of Thin Air" - Brad Kane and Liz Callaway (from Aladdin and the King of Thieves)
26. "Like Other Girls" - Judy Kuhn, Sandra Oh, Lucy Liu, and Lauren Tom (from Mulan II)

=== Disc two ===
1. "A Whole New World (Instrumental)"
2. "Reflection (Instrumental)"
3. "Part of Your World (Instrumental)"
4. "A Dream Is a Wish Your Heart Makes (Instrumental)"
5. "Beauty and the Beast (Instrumental)"
6. "Can You Feel the Love Tonight (Instrumental)"
7. "Once Upon a Dream (Instrumental)"
8. "Kiss the Girl" (Instrumental)
9. "I Won't Say I'm in Love (Instrumental)"
10. "Colors of the Wind (Instrumental)"
11. "He's a Tramp (Instrumental)"
12. "A Spoonful of Sugar (Instrumental)"
13. "So This Is Love (Instrumental)"
14. "Just Around the Riverbend (Instrumental)"

=== Bonus disc ===
1. "Reflection (Remix)" - Christina Aguilera
2. "Part of Your World" - Skye Sweetnam
3. "A Dream Is a Wish Your Heart Makes" - Raven-Symoné, Alyson Michalka, Anneliese van der Pol, Ashley Tisdale, Amy Bruckner, Kyla Pratt, Brenda Song, Cole Sprouse, Dylan Sprouse, Orlando Brown, and Ricky Ullman
4. "Kiss the Girl" - Peter Andre
5. "I Won't Say (I'm in Love) - The Cheetah Girls
6. "Colors of the Wind" - Christy Carlson Romano
7. "If You Can Dream" - Ashley Gearing
8. (I Wanna Be) Like Other Girls - Atomic Kitten
9. "If I Never Knew You" - The Cheetah Girls
10. "Under the Sea" - Raven-Symoné
11. "Zip-A-Dee-Doo-Dah" - Aly & A.J.
12. "True to Your Heart - Raven-Symoné ft. Brenda Song
13. "The Siamese Cat Song" - Hilary Duff and Haylie Duff
14. "Beauty and the Beast" - Jump 5
15. "When You Wish Upon a Star" - Jesse McCartney

== See also ==
- Disneymania
- Princess Disneymania
