= List of performances and awards of Marilyn Monroe =

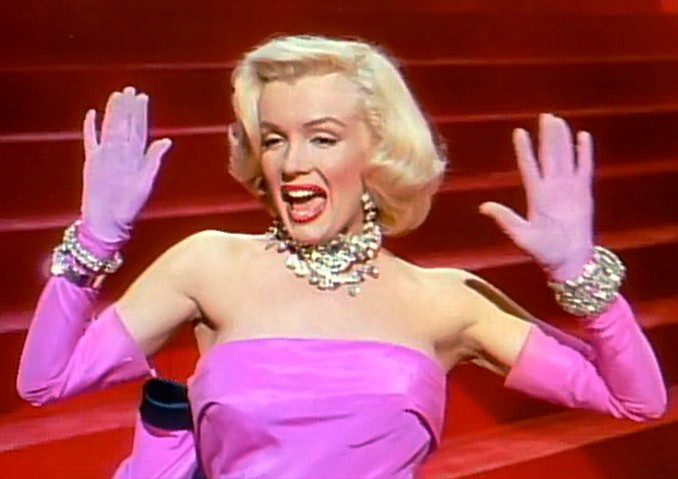
Monroe as Lorelei Lee in Gentlemen Prefer Blondes (1953)

Marilyn Monroe (June 1, 1926 – August 4, 1962) was an American actress who appeared in 29 films between 1946 and 1961. After a brief career in modeling she signed short-term film contracts, first with 20th Century Fox, then Columbia Pictures, and appeared in minor roles for the first few years of her career. In 1950, she made minor appearances in two critically acclaimed films, The Asphalt Jungle and All About Eve. The parts in the two films were against many of the roles into which she was typecast, that of the dumb blonde. Margot A. Henriksen, her biographer with the American National Biography, considers the typecast "an unfair stereotype that bothered her throughout her career".

Her major breakthrough came in 1953, when she starred in three pictures: the film noir Niagara, and the comedies Gentlemen Prefer Blondes and How to Marry a Millionaire. Sarah Churchwell, Monroe's biographer, notes that "unconscious, rather than conscious, sexuality would become the Marilyn hallmark after 1953", and the actress became one of the most popular and recognizable people in America. In 1955 Monroe appeared in the Billy Wilder–directed comedy The Seven Year Itch, in which she becomes the object of her married neighbor's sexual fantasies. In it, Monroe stands on a subway grate with the air blowing up the skirt of her white dress; it became the most famous scene of her career.

After appearing in Bus Stop (1956), Monroe founded her own production company, Marilyn Monroe Productions, in 1955; the company produced one film independently, The Prince and the Showgirl (1957). Monroe then appeared in Some Like It Hot (1959) and The Misfits (1961). She was suspended from the filming of Something's Got to Give in June 1962, and the film remained uncompleted when she died in August. Although she was a top-billed actress for only a decade, her films grossed $200 million by the time of her unexpected death in 1962.

Monroe won, or was nominated for, several awards during her career. Those she won included the Henrietta Award for Best Young Box Office Personality (1951) and World Film Favorite (1953), and a Crystal Star Award and David di Donatello Award for The Prince and the Showgirl (1957). She was inducted to the Hollywood Walk of Fame in 1960, and a Golden Palm Star was dedicated at the Palm Springs Walk of Stars in 1995. In the 1999 American Film Institute's list of AFI's 100 Years...100 Stars, she was ranked as the sixth greatest film actress; three of the films in which she appeared—Some Like It Hot, All About Eve, and The Asphalt Jungle—have been added to the Library of Congress's National Film Registry, and the former earned her a Golden Globe for Best Actress. She continues to be considered a major icon in American popular culture in the decades following her death.

== Filmography ==
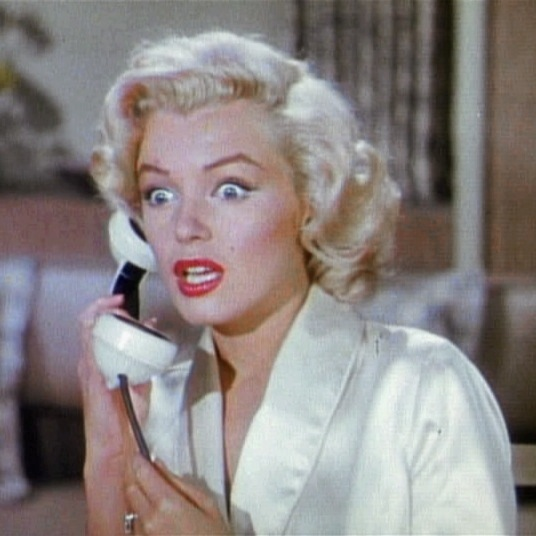
In Gentlemen Prefer Blondes (1953)

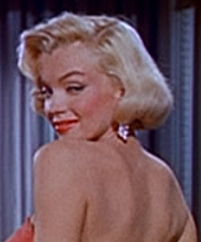
In How to Marry a Millionaire (1953)

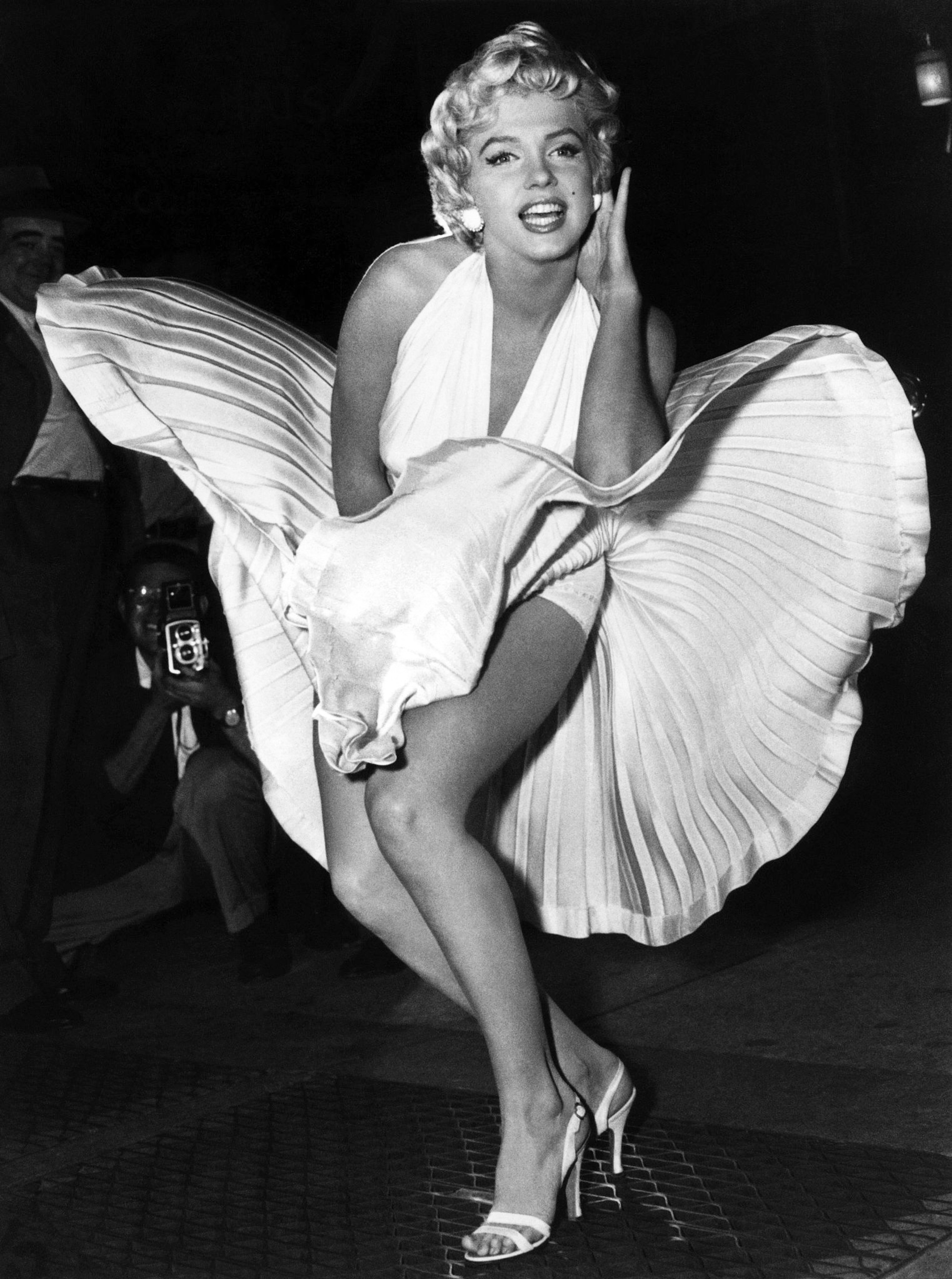
Posing for photographers to promote The Seven Year Itch (1954)

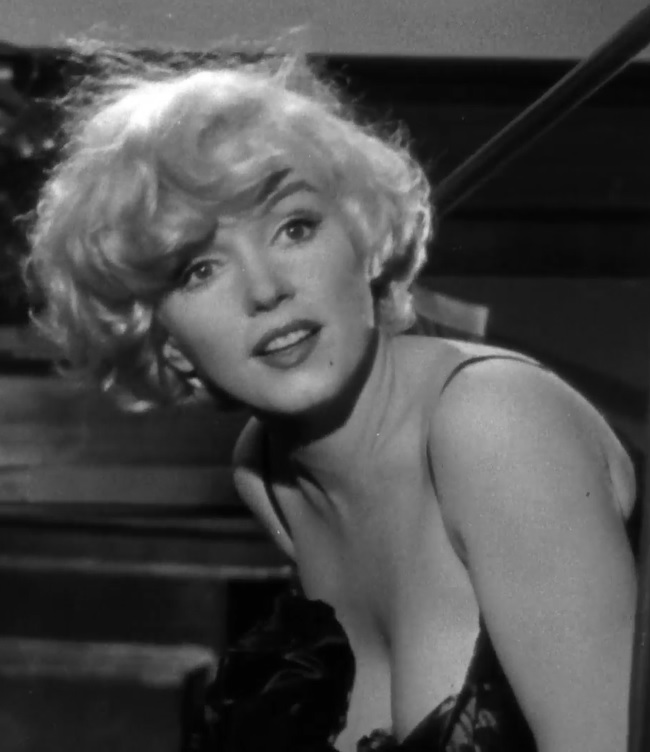
In Some Like It Hot (1959)

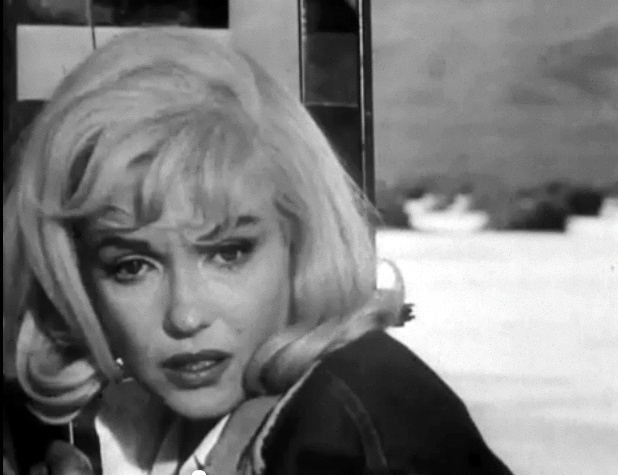
In The Misfits (1961)

Monroe completed 29 films in her career. In 1962, she was filming her 30th film, Something's Got to Give, when she was fired by the studio; she died before it was completed with others in the role.

Year	Title	Role	Notes	Ref.
1947	Dangerous Years	Evie		
1948	Scudda Hoo! Scudda Hay!	Betty	Uncredited	
1948	Ladies of the Chorus	Peggy Martin		
1949	Love Happy	Grunion's client		
1950	A Ticket to Tomahawk	Clara	Uncredited	
1950	The Asphalt Jungle	Angela Phinlay		
1950	All About Eve	Miss Claudia Casswell		
1950	The Fireball	Polly		
1950	Right Cross	Dusky Le Doux	Uncredited	
1951	Home Town Story	Iris Martin		
1951	As Young as You Feel	Harriet		
1951	Love Nest	Roberta Stevens		
1951	Let's Make It Legal	Joyce Mannering		
1952	Clash by Night	Peggy		
1952	We're Not Married!	Annabel Jones Norris		
1952	Don't Bother to Knock	Nell Forbes		
1952	Monkey Business	Lois Laurel		
1952	O. Henry's Full House	Streetwalker	Appeared in The Cop and the Anthem segment	
1953	Niagara	Rose Loomis		
1953	Gentlemen Prefer Blondes	Lorelei Lee		
1953	How to Marry a Millionaire	Pola Debevoise		
1954	River of No Return	Kay Weston		
1954	There's No Business Like Show Business	Victoria Hoffman		
1955	The Seven Year Itch	The Girl		
1956	Bus Stop	Cherie		
1957	The Prince and the Showgirl	Elsie Marina	Produced by Marilyn Monroe Productions (Note: The Prince and the Showgirl was the only film made by her company.)	
1959	Some Like It Hot	Sugar Cane Kowalczyk		
1960	Let's Make Love	Amanda Dell		
1961	The Misfits	Roslyn Taber	Final film role	

=== Box office ranking ===
Year	Place
1953	6th (No. 1 Female Star)
1954	5th (No. 1 Female Star)
1955	11th (No. 3 Female Star)
1956	8th (No. 1 Female Star)
1959	20th (No. 8 Female Star)
1950–1959	No. 1 Female Star from 50s

== Television ==
Year	Title	Role	Notes	Ref.
1953	The Jack Benny Program	Herself		
1954	The Bob Hope Show	Herself		
1955	Person to Person	Herself	Interview with Edward R. Murrow	
1962	President Kennedy's Birthday Salute	Herself	Singing "Happy Birthday, Mr. President"	

== Awards and nominations ==
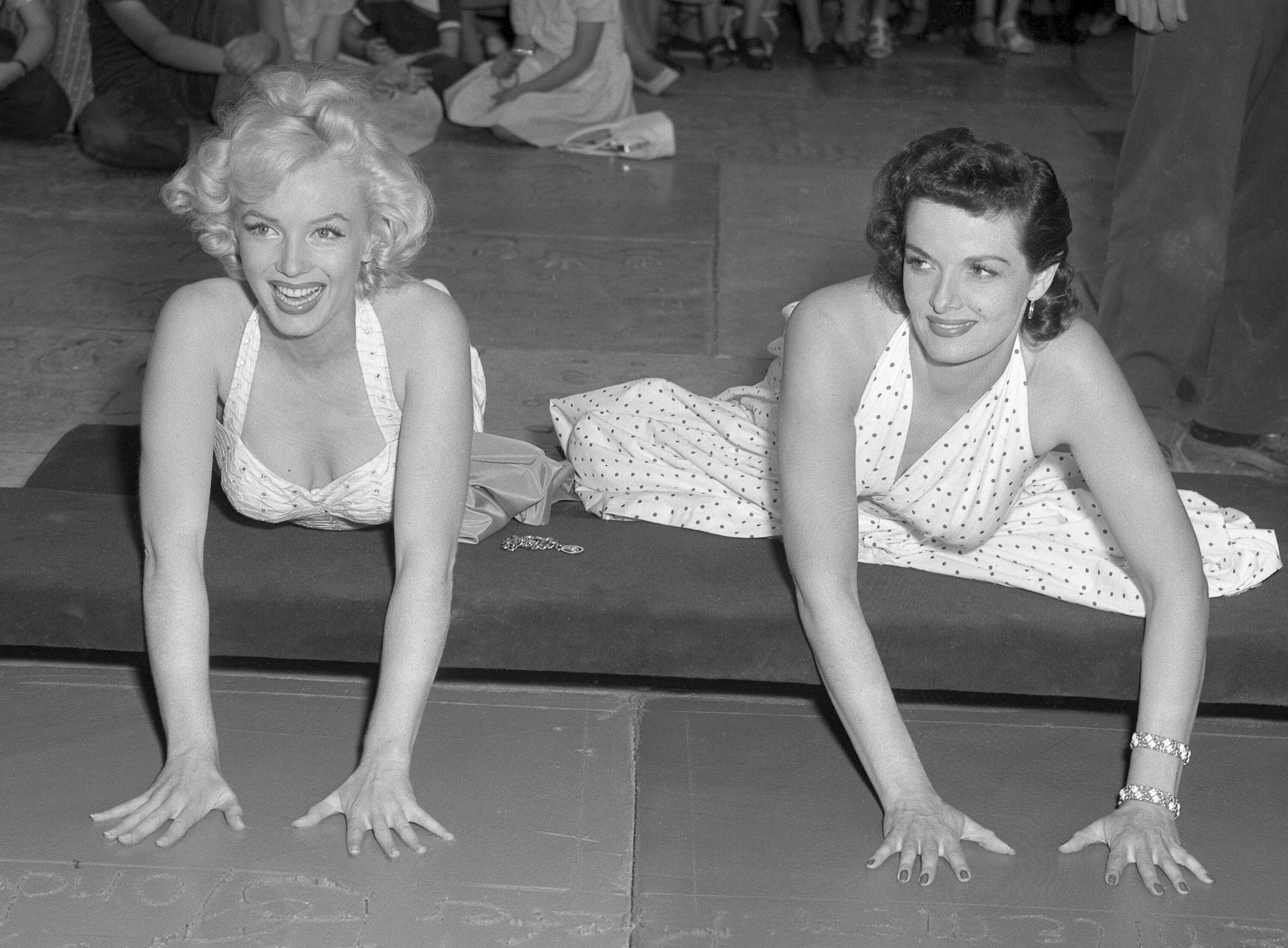
Monroe (left) and Jane Russell at Grauman's Chinese Theater, 1953

Year	Award	Film	Category	Result	Ref.
1951	Henrietta Award	—N/a	Best Young Box Office Personality	Won	
1952	Photoplay Award	—N/a	Fastest Rising Star of 1952	Won	
1952	Look Award	—N/a	Most Promising Female Newcomer of 1952	Won	
1953	Henrietta Award	—N/a	World Film Favorite: Female	Won	
1953	Photoplay Award	—N/a	Most Popular Female Star	Won	
1954	Photoplay Award	Gentlemen Prefer Blondes and How to Marry a Millionaire	Best Actress	Won	
1956	BAFTA Award	The Seven Year Itch	Best Foreign Actress	Nominated	
1956	Golden Globe Award	Bus Stop	Best Motion Picture Actress in Comedy or Musical	Nominated	
1958	BAFTA Award	The Prince and the Showgirl	Best Foreign Actress	Nominated	
1958	David di Donatello Award	The Prince and the Showgirl	Best Foreign Actress	Won	
1959	Crystal Star Award	The Prince and the Showgirl	Best Foreign Actress	Won	
1959	Laurel Award	The Prince and the Showgirl	Top Female Comedy Performance	Fourth place	
1960	Golden Globe Award	Some Like It Hot	Best Motion Picture Actress in Comedy or Musical	Won	
1960	Laurel Award	Some Like It Hot	Top Female Comedy Performance	Second place	
1962	Henrietta Award	—N/a	World Film Favorite: Female	Won	

== Notes and references ==
=== Sources ===
- "Marilyn Monroe". American Film Institute.
- "Marilyn Monroe". British Film Institute. Archived from the original on February 4, 2016.
- Burkhead, Cynthia (2013). Dreams in American Television Narratives: From Dallas to Buffy. London: Bloomsbury Publishing. ISBN 978-1-4411-2417-3.
- Chapman, Gary (2001). "Marilyn Monroe". In Browne, Ray B.; Browne, Pat (eds.). The Guide to United States Popular Culture. University of Wisconsin Press. ISBN 978-0-87972-821-2.
- Churchwell, Sarah (2004). The Many Lives of Marilyn Monroe. Granta Books. ISBN 978-0-312-42565-4.
- Hall, Susan G. (2006). American Icons: An Encyclopedia of the People, Places, and Things that Have Shaped Our Culture. Greenwood Publishing Group. ISBN 978-0-275-98429-8.
- Hyatt, Wesley (2006). Emmy Award Winning Nighttime Television Shows, 1948–2004. Jefferson, NC: McFarland. ISBN 978-0-7864-2329-3.
- Kidder, Clark (2011). Marilyn Monroe: Cover to Cover: Cover to Cover. Iola, WI: Krause Publications. ISBN 978-1-4402-2780-6.
- Lefkowitz, Frances (1995). Marilyn Monroe. New York: Chelsea House Publishers. ISBN 978-0-7910-2342-6.
- Rollyson, Carl (2014). Marilyn Monroe Day by Day: A Timeline of People, Places, and Events. Lanham, MD: Rowman & Littlefield Publishers. ISBN 978-1-4422-3080-4.
- Schneider, Michel (2011). Marilyn's Last Sessions. Edinburgh: Canongate Books. ISBN 978-1-84767-036-6.
- Spoto, Donald (2001). Marilyn Monroe: The Biography. Lanham, MD: Cooper Square Press. ISBN 978-0-8154-1183-3.
- Super, John C. (2005). The Fifties in America. Ipswich, MA: Salem Press. ISBN 978-1-58765-203-5.
- Vogel, Michelle (April 24, 2014). Marilyn Monroe: Her Films, Her Life. Jefferson, NC: McFarland. ISBN 978-0-7864-7086-0.
