= Michael Cronin (actor) =

British actor (born 1942)

- Born: 1942 (age 83–84); Cranfield, Bedfordshire, England
- Occupations: Actor, author
- Years active: 1972–present

Michael Cronin (born 1942) is a British actor.

== Personal life ==
Born in Cranfield, Bedfordshire during World War II, he was educated at St Brendan's College by the Christian Brothers in Bristol, and at the University of London where he studied English. He is married and has two sons.

== Acting career ==
Cronin is a television and stage actor, particularly remembered for his role as the tough but fair PE teacher Geoff 'Bullet' Baxter in the television series Grange Hill between 1979 and 1986. He also made a cameo appearance as Baxter in a 2000 edition of The Grimleys. He also appeared in Fawlty Towers as Irish cowboy builder Lurphy (whom Manuel memorably called a "hideous orangutan"), and as Eliphaz in the 1977 television miniseries Jesus of Nazareth. He has appeared in episodes of Foyle's War, Midsomer Murders, The Gentle Touch, The Sweeney and Bergerac, and played Vyacheslav Molotov in the 1989 TV movie Countdown to War. In 1990 he played Alfred Inglethorp in the Agatha Christie's Poirot film The Mysterious Affair at Styles, and played Sergei in the 2000 television adaptation of Anna Karenina. He also occasionally appeared in the BBC television programme Merlin (2008), as the character Geoffrey of Monmouth. He also made an appearance in the second episode of the second series of Citizen Khan as a friend of Naani's who turns out to be gay. Other television work includes: Marie Curie, The Chinese Puzzle, Midnight at the Starlight, Invasion, Tiny Revolutions, Glorious Day, The Bill, Wycliffe, The History of Tom Jones: a Foundling, Shakespeare Shorts, Our Mutual Friend, Goodnight Mr Tom, My Dad's the Prime Minister, Law & Order: UK, and Mayor of Casterbridge.

His film appearances include roles in The Sexplorer (1975), Secrets of a Superstud (1976), What's Up Nurse! (1977), Under the Bed (1977), Le Pétomane (1979), Hopscotch (1980), Captive (1986), The Hour of the Pig (1993), The Grotesque (1995), Double Identity (2009), The Wolfman (2010), The Raven (2012), In Secret (2013) and In the Heart of the Sea (2015).

His theatre work includes: An Empty Desk (Royal Court); Duet for One, Hamlet, Due Process of Law (Dukes, Lancaster); Hamlet, Jail Diary of Albie Sachs, and Gloo Joo (Young Vic); Hedda Gabler (Octagon, Bolton); Caesar and Cleopatra, The Prisoner of Zenda, and The Corn is Green (Greenwich Theatre). From 1986 to 1991 he worked with the English Shakespeare Company in Richard II, Henry IV Pts 1 and 2, Henry V, Henry VI, Richard III, Coriolanus, and The Winter's Tale, and toured with them in the UK, Europe, Japan, US, India and Australia; All My Sons (Oxford Stage Company/ Wolsey); Purcell's The Indian Queen with the King's Consort and NYMT at the Queen Elizabeth Hall and Schwetzingen Festival in Germany; Hamlet, and, Comedians (The Belgrade, Coventry); Northanger Abbey (Greenwich Theatre); The Merchant of Venice (Salisbury Playhouse); Timon of Athens (AJTC Brix Theatre) The Taming of the Shrew, Don Juan The Masterbuilder, The Cherry Orchard, Love’s Labour’s Lost, Ghosts, King Lear, Romeo and Juliet, Twelfth Night, (English Touring Theatre) Mary Stuart (Derby Playhouse) Richard II (Steven Berkoff) Hamlet, Mother Courage (English Touring Theatre); The Last Confession (Chichester/The Haymarket London); The Ruling Class, Dir Jamie Lloyd, Trafalgar Studios.

== Writing career ==
Michael Cronin has written three children's novels, published by Oxford University Press. His first novel, Against the Day, was short listed for the 1999 Angus Book Award. The story is set after the end of Second World War in an England that has fallen under Nazi occupation. It follows the adventures of two boys who become dangerously involved in a secret resistance movement. A sequel, Through the Night, was published in 2003. A third book in the series, In the Morning, was published in 2005.

He is also a screenwriter with two film screenplays to his credit.

=== Bibliography ===
- Against the Day - 1998 novel (ISBN 0-19-275267-7)
- Through the Night - 2003 novel (ISBN 0-19-275221-9)
- In the Morning - 2005 novel (ISBN 0-19-275447-5)
- No Final Truth - film script
- Stealing the Fire - film script
