= James Napoli =

New York mobster (1911- 1992)

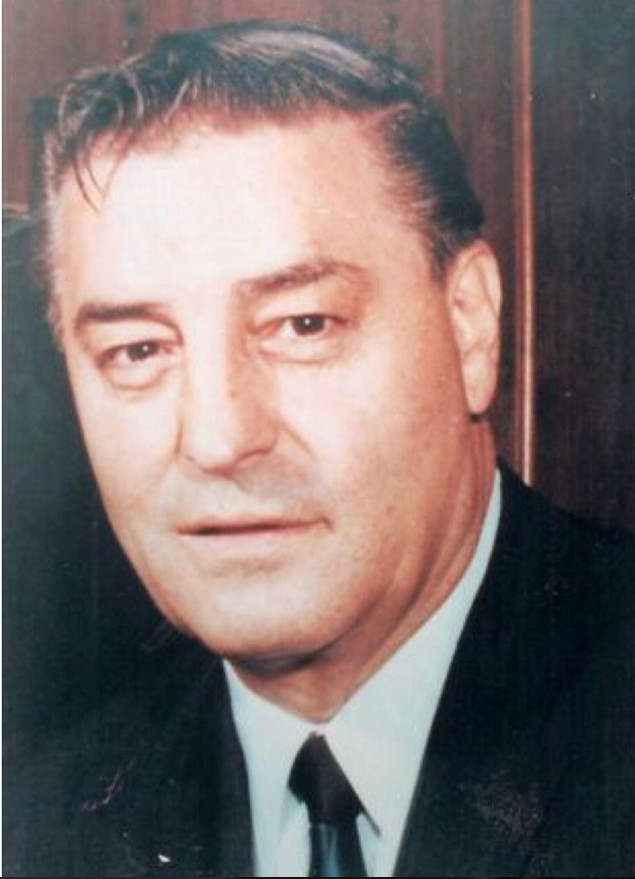

James "Jimmy Nap" Napoli (November 4, 1911 – December 29, 1992) was a New York mobster who was a Caporegime in the Genovese crime family. From the 1950s to the 1980s, he controlled one of the largest illegal gambling operations in the United States, reputedly earning up to $150 million annually.

Jimmy Nap used Crisci’s Restaurant as a base for his job activities.

In 1969, Napoli was indicted for fixing several boxing matches. In the 1970s, Napoli reportedly operated the largest numbers operation in the United States. By 1976, the operation allegedly employed 2,000 people and grossed over $150 million a year. Napoli apparently ran this huge operation from a lounge in the Greenpoint section of Brooklyn. In 1978, Napoli was convicted for gambling and sentenced to five years in federal prison.

In July 1988, Napoli was indicted on murder conspiracy charges. He had been taped by Federal Bureau of Investigation (FBI) agents as he discussed the attempted murders of Gambino crime family boss John Gotti, Gene Gotti and mob associate Irwin Schiff.

On December 29, 1992, Napoli died of natural causes in the Kips Bay section of Manhattan.

Napoli was married to Grace Perrota from November 29, 1933 until her death in 1962, with whom he had five children (four sons and a daughter). Napoli later got remarried to Jeanne Napoli, a former nightclub singer and theatrical producer, with whom he had two daughters. In 1984, Napoli invested $250,000 in an unsuccessful musical biography of actress Marilyn Monroe that starred Jeanne.

Napoli's son, Rocco Napoli, later became a Genovese family soldier and had previously served in the Vietnam war, claiming to have killed around 30 Vietnamese soldiers during his tenure within the U.S. Army service during the 1960s. Rocco Napoli served as the Business Manager of the Local 21 of the Laborer International Union of North America in Newark, New Jersey. Rocco Napoli was arrested in June 1988 along with former Genovese family consigliere Bobby Manna on charges of conspiring to murder 3 individuals, John Gotti, Gene Gotti and the August 1987 murder of Irwin Schiff, Napoli may have also participated in the August 1987 murder of Daniel Conlin, whom had served as the President of Teamsters Local 891, and he was also accused of participating in racketeering from between 1980 and 1988. In September 1989, Napoli was sentenced by former U.S. District Judge Maryanne Trump Barry to over 6 years in prison for charges of racketeering conspiracy, extortion, illegal gambling and labor racketeering.
