= Mark Jones (actor) =

British actor (1939–2010)

- Born: Gerard Roger Jones; 22 April 1939; Wellington, Somerset, England, UK
- Died: 14 January 2010 (aged 70); Shrewsbury, Shropshire, England, UK
- Occupation: Actor

Mark Jones (22 April 1939 – 14 January 2010) was a British actor, who appeared frequently in various films and television series.

Credits include: A Family at War, Z-Cars, Van der Valk, Doctor Who (in the serial The Seeds of Doom), The New Avengers, The Onedin Line, Target, Secret Army, Tales of the Unexpected, Buccaneer, Blott on the Landscape, Casualty, Call Me Mister and Dempsey and Makepeace.

He also appeared in the films Tell Me Lies (1968), Connecting Rooms (1970), Under Milk Wood (1971), Layout for 5 Models (1972), Keep It Up, Jack (1973, title role), The Sexplorer (1975), Secrets of a Superstud (1976), The Medusa Touch (1978), Can I Come Too? (1979), Bear Island (1979), Don't Open till Christmas (1984), and the Star Wars saga film The Empire Strikes Back (1980).

On stage he worked with the RSC several times, including in Peter Brook's production of Marat/Sade at the Aldwych Theatre in 1964, and in its Broadway transfer the following year. He also appeared in the film version.

Did two years National Service at S.H.A.P.E. Paris 1959-61.

== Filmography ==
Year	Title	Role	Notes
1967	Marat/Sade	Mother	
1968	Tell Me Lies	Mark	
1970	M*A*S*H	Minor Role	Uncredited
1970	Connecting Rooms	Johnny	
1971	Under Milk Wood	Evans the Death	
1972	Layout for 5 Models	David	
1974	Keep It Up, Jack	Jack	
1975	The Sexplorer	Lecher	
1976	Secrets of a Superstud	Peter	
1978	The Medusa Touch	Sgt. Hughes	
1979	Bear Island	Cook	
1979	Can I Come Too?	Freddy Lawrence	
1980	The Empire Strikes Back	Commander Nemet (Imperial Officer)	
1981	4D Special Agents	Sgt. Bowman	
1983	Invitation to the Wedding	Customs Officer	
1984	Don't Open till Christmas	Detective Sergeant Powell	
