= Roy Scammell =

British stunt actor (1932–2021)

- Born: Royston Edwin Scammell; 28 July 1932; Kingsbury, England
- Died: 15 May 2021 (aged 88); Luton, Bedfordshire England
- Occupations: Actor, stuntman
- Years active: 1948–2015
- Spouse: Monique Garlopeau (m. 1955; div. 1973)
- Children: 1

Royston Edwin Scammell (28 July 1932 – 15 May 2021) was a British stuntman and actor.

== Life and career ==
Evacuated with his younger brother Terrence to Ridgmont, Bedfordshire during the Second World War in 1941, Scammell was educated at Ridgmont Lower School. Leaving the Annunciation Catholic School in Edgware, North London at age 13, he became a lifeguard and high-diver. However, his love for roller skating and ice-skating led to him becoming a senior ice hockey player for the Wembley Lions. In between games, he devised his own stunt act, jumping over 16 barrels in the rink, impressing the crowds and landing an audition on the Tom Arnold Ice Show before setting off around Europe with the Holiday on Ice touring show.

Being friends with Anthony Newley was beneficial to kick-starting Scammell's career. In 1948, the singer's agent saw him performing somersaults at Highgate Diving Club, leading to him being cast in a commercial followed by an appearance in the film Vice Versa (at this point, financial constraints prevented Scammell from trying out for the 1948 Olympic Games). The following year, his resemblance to Dirk Bogarde led to Scammell doubling for the star during a high-speed motorbike chase in Once a Jolly Swagman.

After doing national service with the RAF at Credenhill (posted to Korea), Scammell returned to London and with help from a friend, was cast as Tarzan in revue at the Windmill Theatre. More body-demanding roles followed before answering an advertisement in The Stage for film stuntmen. Over the next few years, Scammell found himself performing stuntwork in film and television, doubling for the likes of Steve McQueen (The Great Escape and Papillon), Kirk Douglas (Cast a Giant Shadow, where he performed his first high fall), Peter Sellers (Casino Royale), Kenneth Williams (Follow That Camel), Susan Hampshire (Monte Carlo or Bust!) and Malcolm McDowell (A Clockwork Orange). Joining Derek Ware's HAVOC team, he worked on Doctor Who, doubling for Caroline John dangling over a raging weir on the River Thames in The Ambassadors of Death and then performing a plunge from a 50-foot gasometer (the highest fall attempted on the same screen at the time) in Inferno.

Developing into a stunt coordinator, Scammell worked with Andrew Lloyd Webber on the skate-racing scenes in Starlight Express. He also developed sports programmes and set up Chariots of Courage, a sport with elements of ice hockey, polo and lacrosse, designed for disabled competitors.

He died at Luton and Dunstable University Hospital in Luton, Bedfordshire in May 2021 at the age of 88.

== Filmography ==
Year	Title	Role	Notes
1966	Circus of Fear	Man in Speedboat	
1969	The Gladiators	B-5	
1969	The Magic Christian	Bodybuilder	Uncredited
1973	Psychomania	Riding the Motor-cycles	
1973	O Lucky Man!		
1974	The Best of Benny Hill	Member of 'Scuttle's Keep Fit Brigade'	
1975	The Sexplorer	Ballet Dancer	
1977	Under the Bed	Milkman	
1977	Golden Rendezvous	Attacker	
1979	The World Is Full of Married Men	Jeff Spencer	
1980	Flash Gordon	Hawkman #8	
