= David Nixon (magician) =

English magician and television presenter (1919–1978)

- Born: David Porter Nixon; 29 December 1919; Muswell Hill, London, England
- Died: 1 December 1978 (aged 58); Surrey, England
- Occupations: Magician and television presenter
- Spouses: Margaret Burton (m. 1947; div. 1952) Paula Marshall (m. 1952; died 1956) Vivienne Nichols (m. 1961)
- Children: 2

David Porter Nixon (29 December 1919 – 1 December 1978) was an English magician and television personality. At the height of his career, Nixon was among the best-known magicians in the UK.

== Early life ==
Born in Muswell Hill, London, Nixon attended the Westcliff High School for Boys in Westcliff-on-Sea, Essex. His father was a lawyer whose hobby was magic and who took Nixon to watch performers such as Nevil Maskelyne and David Devant. One magician who made an early impression on the young boy was Stanley Collins, who had a gentlemanly image which influenced Nixon's later performing style. Nixon started performing magic himself after an aunt bought him an Ernest Sewell Magic Box for Christmas. On leaving school he gained a job with the Henley Telegraph, the in-house magazine of the W. T. Henley Telegraph company, a publication which had been founded by Alfred Hitchcock. In 1938 he joined The Magic Circle. He also became an accomplished double bass player and performed with a local band.

== Entertainment career ==
With the advent of the Second World War, Nixon joined ENSA, the organisation that was set up to provide entertainment for British troops. He had been prevented from serving in a front line role as a result of suffering from pneumonia when he was a teenager. In summer 1946, after leaving ENSA, he joined the Fol de Rols, a touring variety troupe based in Scarborough and in addition to his conjuring act he acted as compere in their shows. In July 1948, he was in the cast of the "Out of the Blue" revue at the Spa Theatre, Scarborough and he was joined on stage by the actor and comedian Norman Wisdom, who wreaked havoc with his act. The partnership was a success and the two men subsequently appeared at the London Casino in September 1948.

In addition to his magic act, Nixon sang, danced and worked front of house. In 1947, he married a singer named Margaret Burton. The same year he gained his first opportunity on television in a show called Café Continental. Nixon's big break came in 1954 when he was invited to be a panelist on the British version of the television quiz show What's My Line?, appearing in 150 editions between 1954 and 1963. He presented series such as the British version of Candid Camera, Comedy Bandbox (1962) (later David Nixon's Comedy Bandbox (1966) and was Basil Brush's first partner.

Nixon was in demand for private society parties and frequently performed at the soirees of Mayfair hostess, Dorothy Hartman, owner of Lendrum & Hartman Limited, in Berkeley House, Hay Hill in the 1950s. His magic shows included Trix n Nixon (1962) Tonight with David Nixon (1969), David Nixon's Magic Box (1970-71) and The David Nixon Show (1972-77) as well as David Nixon's Christmas Magic (1974) that featured a classic magic trick where Lynsey de Paul appeared to disappear from a glass casket while leaving behind a still warm dress. He also appeared as a panelist in the BBC radio comedy panel game, Many a Slip.

He was the subject of This Is Your Life in 1973 when he was surprised by Eamonn Andrews at the Magic Circle Headquarters in London. He then presented an episode of the programme the following year, in which the subject was the series' regular British host, Eamonn Andrews. A keen chess player, Nixon presented Checkmate, an ATV series teaching the basics of the game.

Alongside his skills as a magician, Nixon liked to use television technology for humour and entertainment. In the 1970s, when the technology of colour separation overlay became available, he developed a way to interact with a recording of himself apparently on the other side of a mirror. Not only was the conversation perfectly coordinated, he also used sleight-of-hand to appear to pass objects back and forth to himself.

David Nixon has been recognised as an influence on future UK magicians as diverse as Wayne Dobson and Jerry Sadowitz.

Nixon was a narrator in the show Emil and the Detectives, at the Mermaid Theatre, London.

David Nixon made his final television appearances posthumously, as a guest on Basil Brush's Magical Christmas, broadcast on BBC1 on 23 December 1978, Celebrity Squares, broadcast on ITV on 24 February 1979 and on Give Us a Clue, also broadcast on ITV on 27 March 1979.

== Mellotron ==
Among Nixon's lesser known activities was his involvement in backing the development and manufacture of the Mellotron, an electro-mechanical musical instrument, and the company Mellotronics. He appeared in a 1965 Pathé News newsreel feature to demonstrate the instrument.

== Death ==
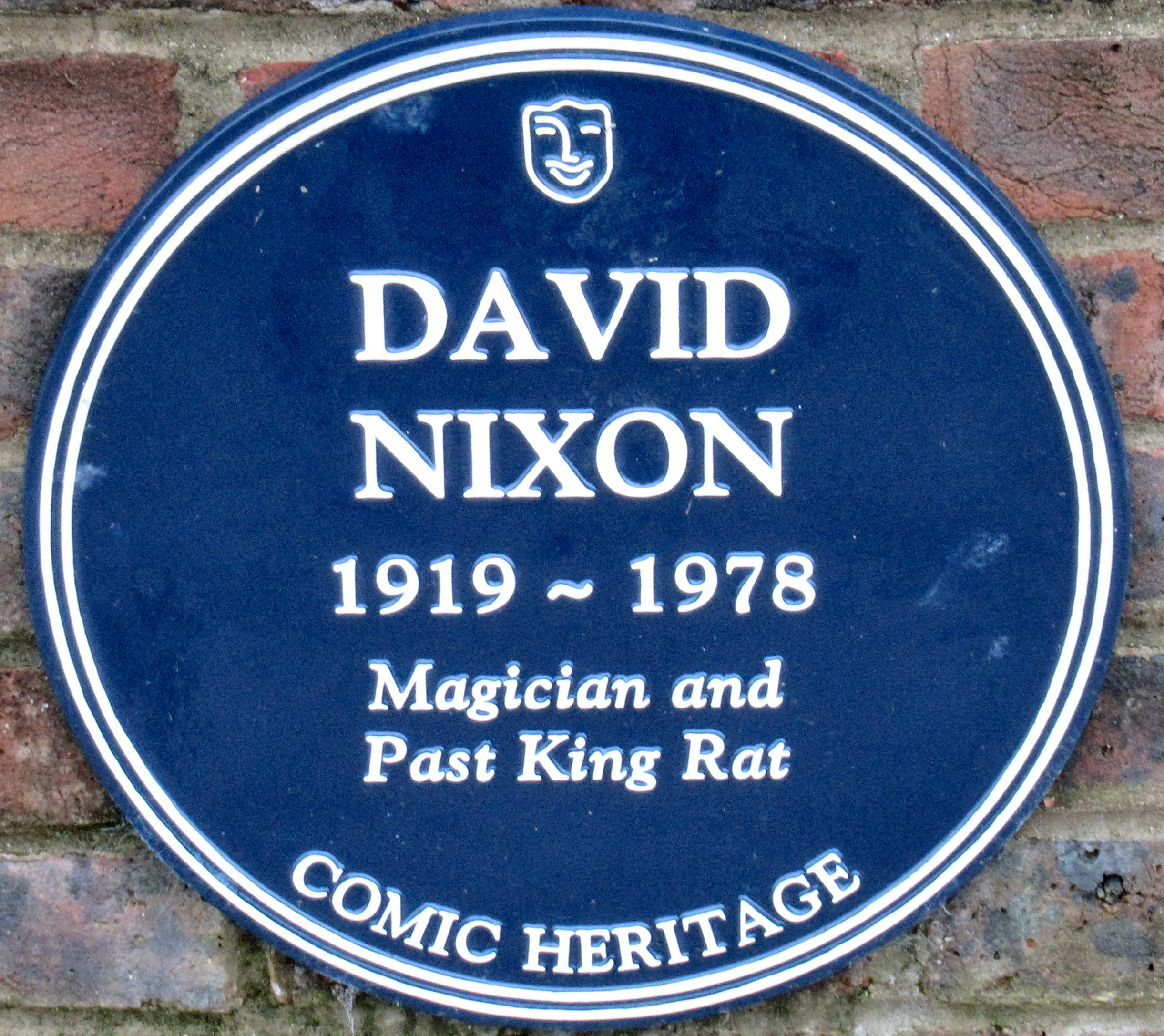
Comic Heritage plaque, Teddington

Nixon died of lung cancer in Surrey in 1978. He was a heavy smoker and was first found to have cancer in 1976. He underwent treatment, which appeared to have been successful, but the disease returned a couple of years later and he died just short of his 59th birthday.

== Private life ==
Nixon married Margaret Burton in 1947; the couple divorced in 1952. Later the same year, Nixon married his second wife, Paula Marshall (Pauline E. Youngs), who worked with him in his act. Paula died aged 28 in a car crash in 1956, the year after the birth of their son. Nixon remarried in 1961 to Vivienne Nichols, the step-daughter of the bandleader Eric Robinson. The couple had a daughter in 1961.

== Selected filmography ==
- The Spider's Web (1960)
