= Margaret Burton (actress) =

English actress (1924–1984)

- Born: 18 March 1924; Keighley, West Riding of Yorkshire, England
- Died: 23 November 1984 (aged 60); Hove, East Sussex, England
- Occupations: Actor and singer
- Spouses: David Nixon (m. 1947–1950) Arnold Moseley (m. 1952–1960) Michael Garvey (m. 1979)

Margaret Burton (18 March 1924 — 23 November 1984) was an English actress who appeared in roughly a dozen British films between 1964 and 1985, including in Sex and the Other Woman (1972) and Secrets of a Superstud (1976), and in the TV series The Tomorrow People.

== Career ==
Burton trained at the Royal Manchester College of Music, and had a successful musical comedy career in the theatre, including as principal boy in pantomime at the London Palladium in 1954, and as Louella Parsons in Marilyn! the Musical at the Adelphi Theatre in 1983.

On TV, she played Gordon's mother in the Last of the Summer Wine episode "Going to Gordon's Wedding" (1976), and appeared in four episodes of Coronation Street in 1980 as Poppy Watts.

== Filmography ==
=== Film ===
Year	Title	Role	Notes
1972	Sex and the Other Woman	Flora	
1976	Secrets of a Superstud	Aunt Sophie	

=== Television ===
Year	Title	Role	Notes
1962	Harpers West One	Barmaid	Episode #2.10
1964	Detective	Kath	Episode: "The Quick One"
1971	Z-Cars	Teresa O'Farrell	Episode: "Nobody Wins, Nobody Loses: Part 1"
1973	ITV Sunday Night Theatre	Landlady	Episode: "Free as a Bird"
1973	Orson Welles Great Mysteries	Secretary Miss Ford	Episode: "For Sale - Silence"
1974	Comedy Playhouse	Mrs. Kintoul	Episode: "Pygmalion Smith"
1974	South Riding	Madame Hubbard	3 episodes
1975	The Tomorrow People	The Momma	"A Man for Emily" - 3 episodes
1975	Three Comedies of Marriage	Barmaid	Episode: "Feeling His Way"
1976	Last of the Summer Wine	Gordon's Mum	Episode: "Going to Gordon's Wedding"
1978	Send in the Girls	Ida Mawson	Episode: "Chickabiddy"
1978	Angels	Mrs. Harris	Episode: "Present Imperfect"
1979	Sally Ann	Mrs. Glendill	Episode: "Put Out to Grass"
1980	Coronation Street	Poppy Watts	4 episodes
1982	Horace	Madame Henrietta	2 episodes
1983	Being Normal	Shop assistant	Television film
1985	The Personal Touch	Street Singer	Television film
