= The Sexplorer =

1976 British film by Derek Ford

- Theatrical release poster
- Directed by: Derek Ford
- Produced by: Morton M. Lewis
- Starring: Monika Ringwald; Andrew Grant; Mark Jones; Tanya Ferova
- Cinematography: Roy Pointer
- Edited by: Howard Lanning
- Music by: John Shakespeare; Derek Warne
- Release date: 19 October 1975 (UK)
- Running time: 82 min.
- Country: United Kingdom
- Language: English

The Sexplorer (US title: The Girl from Starship Venus; UK re-release title: Diary of a Space Virgin) is a 1975 British sex comedy film written and directed by Derek Ford and starring Monika Reingwald. It was produced by Morton M. Lewis. A hardcore version of the film was also made for the foreign market.

== Plot ==
A Venusian explorer, adopting the form of a human woman, visits planet Earth to study the behaviour and customs of Earthlings. She lands in a Soho sauna, and discovers from the Soho bookshops that humans come in male and female forms. She investigates further, visiting a sex cinema, sex shops and a photographer's studio. She meets and falls in love with a young man, and with him she discovers the pleasures of sex. She decides not to return to Venus.

== Cast ==
- Monika Ringwald as The Explorer
- Mark Jones as lecher
- Andrew Grant as Allan
- Anthony Kenyon as man in cinema
- David Rayner as photographer
- Beatrice Shaw as old lady
- Michael Cronin as doctor
- Prudence Drage as sauna attendant
- Anna Dawson as store manageress
- Tanya Ferova as stripper
- Chris Gannon as store detective
- Alan Selwyn as bookshop manager
- Roy Scammell as ballet dancer
- Juliet Groves as ballet dancer
- Albin Pahernik as man in toilet

== Reception ==
The Monthly Film Bulletin wrote "The Sexplorer is meant to be funny as well as erotic, introducing an element of supposed self-parody through the person of its otherworldly sexologist and the 'bizarre' activity on which she turns a quizzical eye, whilst striving of course for the usual quota of titillation. Unfortunately, as it is totally lacking in wit or style, the self-parody acts as a banana skin on which the film slips in its first minutes, falling flat on its face and remaining quite inert for the subsequent eighty minutes."

Film academic Steve Chibnall wrote that the film: "takes a wry look at human sexuality and gender relations through the eyes of a female scientific investigator from another planet ... By setting the investigation in London's Soho, the centre of Britain's sex industry, Ford takes the opportunity to satirise the superficiality of permissiveness. ... The Sexplorer may be a hand-me-down Barbarella in Soho, but its celebration of female sexual potential is just as joyful."

The film is on Quentin Tarantino's list of "Top 20 Grindhouse Classics".
