= P. J. Sparkles =

Discontinued Mattel doll

P.J. Sparkles is a doll made by Mattel beginning in the late 1980s until the early-mid 1990s. The doll features various flashing lights, as well as a dress that can turn into a nightgown. She later inspired a 1992 animated television special produced by Mike Young Productions. Jodi Benson, best known for voicing Ariel in Disney's The Little Mermaid franchise, voiced the title character. This article focuses mainly on the TV special.

== Plot ==
The P.J. Sparkles doll came with an animated movie in which a young orphan girl named P.J., living in Mrs. O'Malley's Orphanage, rides out one night on the orphanage's withered old horse Blaze. Every friend P.J. makes are later adopted and she finds herself alone again from time to time. With the help of O'Malley, she goes out to make a wish upon a star for someone to love her. P.J. soon finds herself in Twinkle Town, a small village full of nameless children who have also been wishing for a leader to love and guide them. Also, Blaze's appearance has changed and he can now talk. P.J. takes on the last name "Sparkles", gives the children their names, and becomes their leader, fulfilling her wish.

However, the neighbors, The Cloak and his wife, Betty, are displeased with the color and bright light that P.J. has brought to the town, and try to sabotage her efforts and return the town to which it was before. Meanwhile, P.J. returns to the human world and meets a young, insecure boy who often plays the "tough-guy" to gain friends. When the two venture back into P.J.'s town, it is ridden by dark magic, causing everybody to hate one another. When she is struck by the magic herself, it is the boy who saves the day and, since then, has learned that there is a much better and positive way to make and have friends.

== Voices ==
- Jodi Benson – P.J. Sparkles
- Samantha Eggar – Mrs. O'Malley / Crown
- Robby Benson – Blaze
- Oliver Muirhead – The Cloak
- Roger Rees – Betty
- Olivia Hack – Glowee
- Janna Michaels – Glimmer
- Dana Hill – Sparks
- Phillip Glasser – Peter
- Ellen Burton – Mother
