= Olive Mercer =

British actress (1905–1983)

- Mercer as Mrs. Yeatman in Dad's Army
- Born: Olive Maude Adams; 15 September 1905; Hendon, Middlesex
- Died: 2 January 1983 (aged 77); Hillingdon, Middlesex
- Occupation: Actress
- Known for: playing Mrs. Yeatman, the wife of Maurice Yeatman, the Verger in Dad's Army

Olive Mercer (15 September 1905 – 2 January 1983), born Olive Maude Adams, was a British television actress perhaps best known for playing Mrs. Yeatman, the wife of Maurice Yeatman, the Verger in Dad's Army.

== Early life ==
Born in 1905 in Hendon in then the country of Middlesex, now the London Borough of Barnet. She was the daughter of Henry James Adams (born 1875), a theatre ticket agent, and Fanny Maria (née Dunnett, 1875–1961).

== Career ==
She often played stern older women in situation comedies, including On the Buses, Billy Liar, Whatever Happened to the Likely Lads?, and The Ronnie Barker Yearbook (1971).

However, she is best known for playing Mrs. Yeatman, the wife of Maurice Yeatman, the Verger, in nine episodes from the third to the ninth series of Dad's Army from 1969 to 1977. In his book: The Complete A-Z of Dad's Army, entertainment journalist Richard Webber lists Mrs. Yeatman's first name as Anthea, however Webber notes that over the course of the series, her first name is also given as Beryl, or Tracey, and that in early scripts, before any recording, she is referred to as Mrs. Harman.

As well as TV, she also starred in film, appearing uncredited in A Clockwork Orange (1971) as the Old Lady at Duke of York, and as the Cleaner in Sex and the Other Woman (1972).

== Personal life and death ==
In 1931, she married Charles Harry Mercer; they remained married until her death. Olive Mercer died in Hillingdon in 1983.
