= Where Everybody Knows Your Name =

1983 single by Gary Portnoy, theme song of the television series "Cheers"

- Sleeve for one of US single releases. The release's other side displays only a greyscale variant of Cheers title card.

Single by Gary Portnoy

from the album Music from Cheers
- Released: January 1983
- Recorded: August 13, 1982
- Genre: TV Theme Song, Soft Rock
- Length: 2:28
- Label: Applause
- Songwriters: Gary Portnoy, Judy Hart-Angelo
- Producers: Gary Portnoy and Judy Hart-Angelo

Gary Portnoy singles chronology
"Where Everybody Knows Your Name" (1983)	"Theme from Punky Brewster (Every Time I Turn Around)" (1984)

"Where Everybody Knows Your Name", also credited as "Theme from Cheers (Where Everybody Knows Your Name)", is the theme song from the television sitcom Cheers, as well as the debut single for Gary Portnoy. The song was written by Portnoy and Judy Hart-Angelo, and performed by Portnoy in 1982. Shortly after the premiere of Cheers, Portnoy went back into the studio to record a longer version of the song that made the U.S. and British pop charts.

The full-length version was made available on Portnoy's 2004 album Keeper. In January 2013, Argentum Records released a five-song EP entitled Cheers: Music from the TV Series which also includes Portnoy's original demo version, as well as several earlier attempts by Portnoy and Angelo at composing the theme.

== History ==
By 1981, New York songwriter Gary Portnoy had already written songs for Air Supply ("I'll Never Get Enough of You") and Dolly Parton ("Say Goodnight"). One night in the summer of that same year, his friend Judy Hart happened to be seated next to a Broadway producer at dinner. Upon finding out that Hart was working for a music publisher, he asked her if she could recommend someone to compose the score for a new musical he was producing. On a whim, Hart, who had never written a song, approached Portnoy, who had never written for the theater. Together they set out to compose the words and music for the musical named Preppies.

In the spring of 1982, Judy, now using her full married name of Judy Hart-Angelo, sent a tape of Preppies' opening number "People Like Us" to a friend in California, who then passed it on to television producers Glen and Les Charles. Upon hearing it they each felt that with a lyric re-write "People Like Us" would be the perfect theme song for their upcoming NBC sitcom, Cheers. Upon learning that "People Like Us" was legally bound to the musical Preppies, the Charles Brothers asked Portnoy and Hart-Angelo to take a shot at composing a theme specifically for Cheers. The song that resulted, "My Kind of People", was somewhat of a reworked version of "People Like Us". It was subsequently rejected.

Portnoy and Hart-Angelo then wrote and submitted two more potential themes for Cheers. One of them, entitled "Another Day", contained a lyric line "There are times when it's fun to take the long way home" that greatly appealed to the Charles brothers. But overall, the song missed the mark and was passed over. The fourth song began with a catchy intro followed by simple alternating chords on a piano. The opening verse lines, both musically and lyrically, were something of a lament. The verse then transitioned into a soaring refrain that seemed to capture the essence of why people might want to go to a place like "Cheers"—a place "Where Everybody Knows Your Name". The two songwriters recorded a simple piano/voice demo of the new song for the Cheers producers. Upon hearing it, the Charles Brothers gave it their stamp of approval, and once Portnoy and Hart-Angelo had complied with a request for a few lyric changes intended to broaden the song's appeal to a more general audience, "Where Everybody Knows Your Name" was officially designated the "Theme from Cheers". The original opening verse,

Singin' the blues when the Red Sox lose,
it's a crisis in your life.
On the run 'cause all your girlfriends
wanna be your wife.
And the laundry ticket's in the wash.

was changed to

Makin' your way in the world today
takes everything you've got.
Takin' a break from all your worries
sure would help a lot.
Wouldn't you like to get away?

After several months of mulling over possible outside singers, the producers eventually asked Gary Portnoy to record the vocal for the opening credits of their new series. (The chorus of the song is six of Portnoy's vocals that he recorded one on top of the other to create the "group sound" of the hook.) It was also decided to maintain the simple feel of the New York demo in the TV version by keeping the number of instruments to a minimum. The finalized version of the Cheers theme song was recorded on August 13, 1982, at Paramount Pictures in Los Angeles, California.

== Accolades ==
The song received an Emmy Award nomination in 1983 for Outstanding Achievement in Music and Lyrics. In a 2011 Readers Poll in Rolling Stone magazine, "Where Everybody Knows Your Name" was voted the best television theme of all time. In 2013, the editors of TV Guide magazine named "Where Everybody Knows Your Name" the greatest TV theme of all time.

== Chart history ==
Chart (1983–1984)	Peak position
UK Singles (Official Charts)	58
US Billboard Hot 100	83
US Adult Contemporary (Billboard)	28
