= Secrets of a Superstud =

1975 British film by Morton M Lewis and Alan Selwyn

Secrets of a Super Stud
- UK theatrical release poster
- Directed by: Morton M Lewis; Alan Selwyn
- Written by: Gerry Levy; Morton M. Lewis; Alan Selwyn
- Produced by: Morton M. Lewis
- Starring: Anthony Kenyon; Mark Jones; Margaret Burton; Raymond Young; Maggie Wright
- Edited by: Peter Pitt
- Music by: John Shakespeare; Derek Warne; Ross McManus
- Distributed by: Butcher's Film Service
- Release date: 1976
- Running time: 90 minutes
- Country: United Kingdom
- Language: English

Secrets of a Super Stud (also known as It's Getting Harder All the Time and Naughty Girls on the Loose) is a 1976 British sex comedy film directed by Morton M. Lewis and Alan Selwyn, and starring Anthony Kenyon, Mark Jones and Margaret Burton. It was written by Lewis, Selwyn and Gerry Levy.

== Plot ==
Custer Firkinshaw, the owner of Bare Monthly magazine is up to his neck in dirty pictures and sexy secretaries. His hedonistic ways are however temporarily halted when his Uncle Charlie dies and Custer is pitted against his relatives. His uncle leaves Custer a fortune in the will, but only on the condition that he marries and has a child within 12 months, otherwise it all goes to his relatives. Custer's money grabbing Aunt Sophie knows only too well about Custer's swinging ways, so keep tabs on him by hiring a crooked private detective Bernie Selby.

When Custer visits a doctor both parties discover that due to Custer's oversexed lifestyle he's only got 13 units of 'sexually activity' left, meaning he has only 13 more attempts to father a child. When Aunt Sophie learns of this she plans to stitch Custer up calling on Selby to hire girls to seduce Custer and use up those potent 13 units of sexual activity. It is then a race against time as Custer tries to find a suitable bride to impregnate while Selby's girls pose as cat burglars, "lost" neighbours and even drag up as meter inspectors in order to catch lure Custer into temptation.

== Cast ==
- Anthony Kenyon as Custer Firkinshaw
- Mark Jones as Peter
- Alan Selwyn as Bernie Selby
- Margaret Burton as Aunt Sophie
- Raymond Young as Uncle Clifton
- Maggie Wright as Sybil
- Jennifer Westbrook as Miranda
- David Rayner as Dr. Lemmon
- Michael Cronin as Dr. Halldenburger
- Bobby Sparrow as Beryl
- Juliet Groves as Julie
- Daniella Fletcher as Miss Effingwell
- Jeannette Charles as the lady
- Cosey Fanni Tutti as gas girl

== Production ==
It was shot at Twickenham Film Studios under the title Custer's Thirteen. The general release prints and the hardcore version were processed at Kay Labs at Highbury, North London.

Details of the film's hardcore version were leaked by the magazine Cinema X, after the magazine had become disillusioned by certain British filmmakers' refusal to acknowledge they were shooting hardcore: "at Cinema X magazine we know which directors have shot porno; we've talked to their stars. But its little use quoting them, when the directors, producers, above all their distributors, vociferously deny everything. We prefer honesty in our pages."

== Songs ==
Secrets of a Super Stud contains several songs that relate the film's plot as if it were a western, using many double-entendres (‘Custer's last stand', ‘quick on the drawers'). The songs were written by Ross McManus, and performed by McManus and Laura Lee. They include:

- "It's Getting Harder All the Time" (sung by McManus)
- "Custer Firkinshaw" (sung by McManus)
- "This is Your Last Stand" (sung by Lee)

== Reception ==
The Monthly Film Bulletin wrote: "With its rumpled, woelully unprepossessing middle-aged hero grudgingly accepting the role of compulsive Casanova, Secrets of a Superstud is one of the few sex films that seems to have been made explicitly as wish fulfilment for its legendary audience, the man-in-the-mac. Otherwise, plot, gags and characters could only be the wish fulfilment of a computer programmed to produce the ideal British Blue Movie."
