= Ross MacManus =

English musician and singer and father of Elvis Costello (1927–2011)

- Born: Ronald Patrick Ross McManus; 20 October 1927; Birkenhead, Cheshire, England
- Died: 24 November 2011 (aged 84) England
- Years active: 1950–2011
- Labels: His Master's Voice, Decca
- Formerly of: Joe Loss; Elvis Costello; Francis Platt

Ronald Patrick Ross McManus (20 October 1927 – 24 November 2011), known as Ross MacManus, was an English musician, singer and trumpet player of Irish descent. He performed with Joe Loss and his orchestra. He was the father of Elvis Costello (born Declan MacManus).

== Life and career ==
McManus was born on Conway Street, Birkenhead, to Mabel and Pat McManus. He began singing at the age of nine as a chorister at St Thomas' Roman Catholic Church. He attended St Anselm's College. He later adapted his surname to MacManus.

Prior to joining the Joe Loss Band, he had his own band called Ross MacManus & The New Era Music from 1950 until 1955. That bebop band played at various Liverpool nightspots. He later joined Joe Loss in March 1955. He wrote and sang "Patsy Girl", a 1964 single credited to Ross McManus and the Joe Loss Blue Beats. The song was featured on the "Fathers" episode of Bob Dylan's radio series, Theme Time Radio Hour in 2006. In 1970, he recorded a version of The Beatles' song "The Long and Winding Road" under the pseudonym of Day Costello, which spent 17 weeks in the Australian chart, peaking at number 16. Around the same time, he also performed pseudonymous session work recording soundalike cover songs of then-current hits, which were issued on budget-priced EPs in the UK. The EPs would typically feature six songs by (allegedly) six different artists: MacManus might appear on an EP as one, two or even three of these artists, under aliases including Frank Bacon and Hal Prince.

MacManus was responsible for the music and vocals from the R. White's Lemonade television advertisement theme song "Secret Lemonade Drinker", on which Costello sang backing vocals.

He also wrote and sang a number of songs for British 1970s' sex comedies including the Alan Street trilogy (1974), Secrets of a Superstud (1976) and Can I Come Too? (1979).

He played the trumpet on two of Elvis Costello's albums: Out Of Our Idiot (1987) on the song, "A Town Called Big Nothing", credited to the MacManus Gang and originally recorded for the film Straight To Hell, and Mighty Like A Rose (1991) on the song, "Invasion Hit Parade". His 1972 album of cover versions of Elvis Presley songs, Elvis Presley's Golden Hits Sung by Big Ross & The Memphis Sound, was reissued on CD in 2008 as Elvis' Dad Sings Elvis.

McManus died in November 2011, at the age of 84.

== Personal life ==
MacManus married Lillian Alda Ablett in 1952; the couple later divorced. Their son Declan, better known as Elvis Costello, was born in 1954. With his second wife, Sara Thompson, a singer who died on 12 November 2011, he had four sons. One, Ronan, was lead singer in The BibleCode Sundays. MacManus was the father-in-law of Costello's wife, singer Diana Krall.

Ross's father, Patrick Matthew McManus, (Note: Ross changed the spelling of his surname to MacManus early in his career as a musician.) known as Pat, was also a professional musician. From the age of eight, Pat was raised in an orphanage where he learned to play trumpet. He later played trumpet as an army bandsman, a ship's musician for the White Star Line, and an orchestra musician in music halls and in theatres showing silent films. Costello has said that Pat, being the first in the family to make a career in music, is the reason he himself is a musician.

== UK discography ==
=== Singles ===
- "Patsy Girl" / "I'm the Greatest" by Ross McManus and the Joe Loss Blue Beats (His Master's Voice, 1964)
- "Stop Your Playing Around" / "Girlie Girlie" by Ross McManus (His Master's Voice, 1966)
- "Can't Take My Eyes Off You" / "If I Were A Rich Man" by Ross McManus (Decca, 1967)
- "The Long And Winding Road" / "Free (Unlimited Horizons)" by Day Costello (Spark, 1970)

=== Albums ===
- Elvis Presley's Golden Hits Sung by Big Ross & The Memphis Sound (1972)
- Elvis' Dad Sings Elvis (reissued on CD in 2008)
