= Sex and the Other Woman =

1972 British film by Stanley Long

- Theatrical release quad poster
- Directed by: Stanley A. Long
- Written by: Adrien Reid
- Produced by: Barry Jacobs; Stanley A. Long
- Starring: Richard Wattis
- Cinematography: Michael Boultbee
- Edited by: N.C.S.
- Music by: Pat Ryan; Jacky Tayler
- Production company: Salon Productions
- Distributed by: Salon Productions
- Release date: 30 December 1972
- Running time: 88 minutes
- Country: United Kingdom
- Language: English

Sex and the Other Woman (also known as The Other Woman) is a 1972 British sex comedy film directed by Stanley A. Long, presented by Richard Wattis. It was written by Adrien Reid and comprises a quartet of stories on the subject of adultery.

== Plot ==
Following a short opening sequence in which a henpecked husband finds relief from his wife's nagging by using a sex doll, the film's presenter introduces a quartet of stories concerning adultery and infidelity. The first concerns Lisa, a flirty, mini-skirted, office secretary, who seduces married fellow office worker Chris. The second story involves Liz, a gold-digging model, who becomes involved with a married and rich tennis player, including seducing him in his private jet, but then leaves him when his divorce from his wife Flora leaves him penniless. In the third story, Guy, a middle-aged man, is seduced by his daughter Louise's eighteen-year-old schoolfriend Sarah after he offers to paint her portrait. The fourth story involves cheating husband Ted whose affair with his wife's best friend results in him being told he must share his house with both his wife and his mistress.

== Cast ==
- Richard Wattis as presenter
- Maggie Wright as Liz
- Jane Cardew as Lisa
- Felicity Devonshire as Sarah
- Bartlett Mullins as Henry
- Peter Dunn as Chris
- Anthony Bailey as Reggie
- Raymond Young as Guy
- Max Mason as Ted
- Louise Pajo as Shirley
- Margaret Burton as Flora
- Peggy Ann Clifford as Henry's wife
- Jeremy Nicholas as Arthur
- Louise Rush as Louise
- Mary Barclay as Cynthia
- Barbara Meale as Barbara
- Kay Adrian as Flora's friend
- Barbara Wendy as Sally
- Gordon Gale as Arnold
- Gillian Brown as Sue
- Anthony Howard as Managing Director
- Stacey Davies as Kershaw
- Olive Mercer as cleaner
- Stella Tanner as mother-in-law
- Paul Greenwood as Chris (uncredited)

== Critical reception ==
Monthly Film Bulletin wrote: "Four tales of adultery, thematically linked by the energy and sexual initiative attributed to Other Women of all ages and sizes. Any hopes aroused by Richard Wattis' sardonic presentation that Sex and the Other Woman may prove less formulary than rival 'sex surveys' are dashed as soon as the first episode creaks its cumbersomely plotted way to some predictably inexplicit scenes of love-making. The film makes the usual comic capital out of sexual guilt – hasty copulation on the office couch, speeded-up motion as the characters hurriedly don their clothes after infidelity – while elsewhere script, direction and acting prove equally unconvincing."
