= Sins of the Fathers (1948 film) =

- Directed by: Phil Rosen
- Starring: Austin Willis; Joy Lafeur; Mary Barclay
- Production company: Canadian Productions
- Release date: 1948
- Country: Canada
- Language: English
- Budget: $80,000

Sins of the Fathers is a 1948 Canadian film about the effect of syphilis in a small Canadian town. Ben Edwards is a crusading doctor who tries to pass a public health law, against the hypocritical opposition of the leaders of the community who profit from prostitution and slums. Finally the opponents find out that they themselves have syphilis and have transmitted it to their own children. The film incorporates educational films produced by the U.S. Public Health Service. Directed by Phil Rosen, it was very successful at the box office.
