= Marilyn Monroe mural =

Mural by John Bailey in Washington, D.C.

The Marilyn Monroe mural, located at 2602 Connecticut Ave NW, Washington D.C, depicts pop culture icon Marilyn Monroe on the upper outside wall of Salon Roi. It was installed in 1981 by artist John Bailey. It was commissioned by Charles Stinson for Salon Roi's owner, Roi Barnard's 40th birthday.

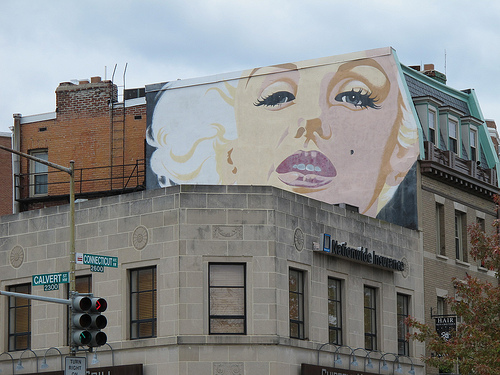
Marilyn Monroe Mural by John Bailey

In 2001, the Woodley Park Neighborhood Association donated funds and brought Bailey back to restore the mural to its original vibrancy, as it had faded greatly. New lights, donated by Starwood Urban, were installed to illuminate the mural at night. The Chipotle Mexican Grill on the corner of Connecticut Ave. and Calvert St., located below the mural, pays for the ongoing electrical costs for the lighting.

The Marilyn Monroe mural in Washington, DC

The mural has gained widespread fame as a Washington D.C landmark. It is a stop on the Old Towne Trolley tourist bus, and is consistently reproduced in paintings, T-shirts, calendars and postcards. It was voted as the first runner-up in the Washington City Paper's Reader's Poll: Best Mural of D.C 2014.
