= Comedy Bandbox =

British TV comedy show (1962–1966)

Comedy Bandbox is a British TV show that was produced in Manchester by ABC Television from 1962 to 1966. Four series and 54 episodes were produced. It had a revue format in which a variety of comedians performed stand-up and sketches. The last series was hosted by David Nixon and so was retitled David Nixon's Comedy Bandbox. Several famous stars made their TV debut on the show including Jimmy Tarbuck and Mike Yarwood.

== See also ==
- Variety Bandbox
