= Jeanne Napoli =

American singer-songwriter

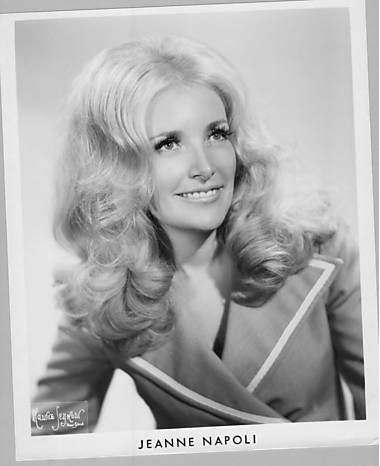
- Jeanne Napoli in the early 1970s
- Born: Eugenia Correll; October 26, 1938; Wilkes-Barre, Pennsylvania, U.S.
- Died: October 24, 2010 (aged 71)
- Occupation(s): Actress, singer, lyricist
- Spouse: James Napoli (m. 1964; died 1992)
- Children: Danielle Napoli, Casey Napoli

Jeanne Napoli (October 26, 1938 - October 24, 2010) was an American pop singer, songwriter, actress, and musical performer. She was signed to the Vigor sub-label of New York's De-Lite Records in 1976. She is best known for the disco track, "Let's Make Love".

== Career ==
Jeanne Napoli started out her career as a Copa-Girl in New York City's famous Copacabana. She went on to be a performer in the singing duo The PJ's. She co-wrote the music for Marilyn: An American Fable at the Minskoff Theater Original Musical in 1983. She co-wrote the Air Supply song "I'll Never Get Enough of You" with Gary Portnoy and Judy Quay, which became number 1 in Japan.

She was married to James Napoli.

== Selected discography ==
=== Albums ===
- Jeanne (1976)
- Marilyn: An American Fable (musical, 1983)

=== Singles ===
- "Forget That Girl" (1976)
- "Let's Make Love" (1977)

=== Songwriting credits ===
- "I'll Never Get Enough of You" (1979) with Gary Portnoy & Judy Quay
- "Intergalactic Christmas" (1980) with Douglas P. Frank & Randy Klein
- "I Found My Strength in You" (1980) with Douglas P. Frank & Jamie Carr
- "Double Trouble" (1980) with Douglas P. Frank
- "Sweet Days of Youth" (1980) with Alex & Mark Peskanov
- "Feeling Goes On" (1980) with Bruce Gray
- "I Found Myself Alone" (1980) with Doug Frank

=== Other recorded songs ===
- "Mysterious Lover" (from the He Knows You're Alone soundtrack, performed by Napoli, words by Napoli & deBorge Roggeman)
