= Gary Portnoy =

American musician and singer-songwriter (born 1956)

- Born: June 8, 1956 (age 69)
- Origin: Long Island, New York, U.S.
- Genres: Pop; country
- Occupations: Vocalist, musician, songwriter
- Years active: 1980–present

Gary Portnoy (born June 8, 1956) is an American musician and singer-songwriter. He is best known for co-writing and performing the main theme song of the NBC sitcom Cheers, "Where Everybody Knows Your Name".

== Career ==
In the early 1980s, Gary Portnoy and Judy Hart Angelo set out to write a theme for Cheers. After their first two attempts were rejected, "Where Everybody Knows Your Name" was selected.

Prior to that, Portnoy's songs had been recorded by various artists, including Dolly Parton's "Say Goodnight" (co-written by Susan Sheridan) and Air Supply's "I'll Never Get Enough of You" (co-written by Jeanne Napoli and Judy Quay). He also recorded and released a self-titled album in 1980 for Columbia Records.

Portnoy also wrote several songs for the NBC television series Fame, including the Emmy-nominated track for Best Original Song, "I Still Believe In Me" (co-written by Susan Sheridan) as well as "It's Gonna Be a Long Night" (co-written by Estelle Levitt). Both songs were featured on the 1982 album, The Kids from "Fame". Portnoy also received an Emmy nomination for the Cheers theme, as well as six consecutive ASCAP awards during the 1980s for the Most Performed Television Themes of the year. He also wrote (with Hart Angelo) the theme songs for the television programs Punky Brewster and Mr. Belvedere, performing the former himself, while Leon Redbone performed the latter.

In 2003, after a hiatus from the music business during the 1990s, Portnoy released the 12-track album Keeper, which includes the full-length version of "Where Everybody Knows Your Name". In 2007, he followed with the release of the autobiographical 12-track album, Destiny, which contains a full-length version of the theme song for Mr. Belvedere (whose original version was sung by Leon Redbone). In 2010, Portnoy released the 12-track album, Songs Along The Way, which includes eleven newly penned compositions as well as the demo version of the Cheers theme song.

In 2013, Portnoy's Argentum Records released Gary Portnoy's Original Cheers Theme across all digital platforms. It includes Portnoy and Hart Angelo's three initial attempts at composing the theme as well as their songwriting demo and subsequent full-length recording of "Where Everybody Knows Your Name". 2017 saw the release of Pushing Sixty, Portnoy's fifth full-length CD.

== Discography ==
=== Albums ===
- Gary Portnoy (1980, Columbia Records)
- Keeper (2003, Argentum Records)
- Destiny (2007, Argentum Records)
- Songs Along The Way (2010, Argentum Records)
- Gary Portnoy's Original Cheers Theme EP (2013, Argentum Records)
- Pushing Sixty (2017, Argentum Records)

=== Songs recorded by other artists (partial list) ===
- "When I'm Loving You" (co-written by Paul Vance)

Recorded by Gail Wynters for her 1977 RCA album, Let The Lady Sing

- "Shee Moe Foe" (co-written by Irwin Levine)

Recorded by Mac Davis for his 1978 Columbia album, Fantasy

- "I'll Never Get Enough of You" (co-written by Jeanne Napoli and Judy Quay)

Recorded by Samantha Sang for her 1979 Private Stock album, From Dance To Love
Recorded by Air Supply for their 1981 Arista album, The One that You Love

- "On The Run" (co-written by Jeanne Napoli)

Recorded by Cheryl Ladd for her 1979 Capitol album, Dance Forever

- "Say Goodnight" (co-written by Susan Sheridan)

Recorded by Dolly Parton for her 1980 RCA album, Dolly, Dolly, Dolly

- "Late Night Confession" (co-written by Juli Davidson)

Recorded by Glen Campbell for his 1980 Capitol album, Something Bout You Baby I Like

- "Move A Little Closer" (co-written by Jeanne Napoli)

Recorded by Keith Barrow for his 1980 Capitol album, Just As I Am

- "When the Night Ends" (co-written by Ruth Rosen Greenwood)

Recorded by Engelbert Humperdinck for his 1981 Columbia album, Don't You Love Me Anymore

- "Say Goodnight" (co-written by Susan Sheridan)

Recorded by Engelbert Humperdinck for his 1981 Columbia album, Don't You Love Me Anymore

- "I Still Believe In Me" (co-written by Susan Sheridan)

Recorded by Debbie Allen and Erica Gimpel as featured on the 1982 RCA album, The Kids From "Fame"

- "It's Gonna Be a Long Night" (co-written by Estelle Levitt)

Recorded by Lori Singer as featured on the 1982 RCA album, The Kids From "Fame"

- "I Was Only Trying To Help" (co-written by Ruth Rosen Greenwood)

Recorded by Valerie Landsburg as featured on the 1982 RCA album, The Kids From "Fame" Again

- "Face To Face" (co-written by Judy Hart Angelo)

Recorded by Valerie Landsburg as featured on the 1983 RCA album, The Kids From "Fame" Sing For You

- "Come to Me Tonight" (co-written by Susan Sheridan)

Recorded by Roberto Carlos for his 1990 Columbia album, From Brazil With Love

- "Mr. Belvedere Theme" (co-written by Judy Hart Angelo)

Recorded by Leon Redbone as featured on the 1996 TVT album, Television's Greatest Hits Volume 6

- "This Is Forever" (co-written by Gloria Nissenson and Carol Ann Brown)

Recorded by Samantha King for her 2002 SKMG album, This Is Forever

- "The Horse" (co-written by Gloria Nissenson and Matt Rossi)

Recorded by Mammoth Jack for their 2002 Broken Bow album, Mammoth Jack

- "I Miss Us" (co-written by Gloria Nissenson)

Recorded by Sarah Gayle Taylor for her 2008 Lure album, Texas Sweetheart
