= Marilyn: An American Fable =

Marilyn
- An American Fable
- Music: Jeanne Napoli; Doug Frank; Gary Portnoy; Beth Lawrence; Norman Thalheimer
- Lyrics: Jeanne Napoli; Doug Frank; Gary Portnoy; Beth Lawrence; Norman Thalheimer
- Book: Patricia Michaels
- Basis: The life of Marilyn Monroe
- Productions: 1983 Broadway

Marilyn: An American Fable is a musical based on a book by Patricia Michaels with music and lyrics by Jeanne Napoli, Doug Frank, Gary Portnoy, Beth Lawrence, and Norman Thalheimer.

== History ==
Not to be confused with the West End production Marilyn! starring Stephanie Lawrence, this allegedly "authorized" version (officially endorsed by acting coach Lee Strasberg's wife Anna), while also based on events in the life of screen icon Marilyn Monroe, was a highly fictionalized account, complete with a happy ending, set on a huge, vacant Hollywood soundstage.

The production underwent numerous changes throughout its development period. During rehearsals, original star Geralyn Petchel was replaced by Alyson Reed in the role of Norma Jean/Marilyn Monroe, and Danielle DuClos was replaced by Kristi Coombs as Young Norma Jean. After previews began, director/choreographer Kenny Ortega was replaced by Thommie Walsh and Baayork Lee, although Ortega retained credit in the program. Ten musical numbers were dropped and forty-five minutes of dialogue were excised before opening night. Among the characters retained were young Norma Jean Baker, who interacted with her adult self, and a Greek chorus-like trio called Destiny, who provided a running commentary about the sex goddess's woes.

== Production ==
The musical opened on Broadway on November 20, 1983 at the Minskoff Theatre, and closed on December 3, 1983, after only seventeen performances and 34 previews. In addition to Reed, the cast included Scott Bakula (making his Broadway debut) as Joe DiMaggio, Willie Falk (as Tommy), Will Gerard as Arthur Miller, and Kristi Coombs as young Norma Jean.

Reed was nominated for the 1984 Drama Desk Award for Outstanding Actress in a Musical.

== Songs ==
Act I

SCENE 1: A SOUNDSTAGE, HOLLYWOOD LAND

- "We Are The Ones" – The Company

SCENE 2: UNDER THE HOLLYWOOD HILLS, 1934 – 1942

- "Close the Door, Norma" – Destiny
- "A Single Dream" – Young Norma Jean, Destiny
- "Jimmy Jimmy" – Destiny, Norma Jean, Babs, Jim, Pat, Ensemble
- "Church Doors" – Destiny

SCENE 3: THE PARACHUTE FACTORY, 1945

- "Miss Parachute" – Photographer, Madge, Elda, Dottie, Ramona, Virginia

SCENE 4: OVERSEAS

- "The Golden Dream" – Soldier

SCENE 5: AGENT'S HOME, HOLLYWOOD

- "Uh-Huh" – Agent

SCENE 6: STUDIO EXECUTIVE'S OFFICE

SCENE 7: THE SOUNDSTAGE, 1948 – 1953

- "Can't Keep My Heart From Racing" – Marilyn
- "Money, Men, And More" – Marilyn, Men

SCENE 8: A MOVIE BALCONY

SCENE 9: THE SOUNDSTAGE, 1955

- "I'll Send You Roses" – Joe, Marilyn
- "Church Doors" – Destiny

SCENE 10: MARILYN'S DRESSING ROOM

SCENE 11: DIMAGGIO'S RESTAURANT

- "I'll Send You Roses" (Reprise) – Joe, Marilyn

SCENE 12: PREMIER NIGHT

- "It's A Premiere Night" – The Company
- "Stairway Leading Nowhere" – Marilyn
Act 2

SCENE 1: MARILYN'S BEDROOM

- "We'll Help You Through The Night" – Destiny

SCENE 2: SOUNDSTAGE

- "Shootin" – Marilyn, The Company
- "Run Between The Raindrops" – Marilyn
- "You Are So Beyond" – Tommy

SCENE 3: NEW YORK CITY, 1956 – 1960

- "In Disguise" – Marilyn, Arthur, Ensemble
- "A Special Man" – Destiny
- "Church Doors" – Destiny

SCENE 4: NEW YORK PENTHOUSE

- "Don't Hang Up The Telephone" – Joe, Marilyn

SCENE 5: NEW YORK TO HOLLYWOOD

- "All Roads Lead To Hollywood" – Marilyn, The Company

SCENE 6: SOUNDSTAGE

- "My Heart's An Open Door" – Marilyn, Joe
- "Miss Bubbles" – Marilyn, Men's Ensemble
- "A Single Dream" (Reprise) – Marilyn

== Critical reception ==
In The New York Times, Frank Rich wrote "Marilyn is incoherent to the point of being loony. I defy anyone to explain - just for starters - why 10 chorus boys dressed in pink plumbers' costumes sing a song about bubble baths at the climax of Act II."

== Awards and nominations ==
=== 1984 Drama Desk Nomination ===
- Outstanding Actress in a Musical – Alyson Reed

== See also ==
- Bombshell
- Marilyn! the Musical
