= Marilyn! the Musical =

Flyer

Marilyn! the Musical is a musical written by Mort Garson about Marilyn Monroe that was originally produced in London in 1983 as a vehicle for Stephanie Lawrence.

The show's book and lyrics were by Jacques Wilson and it opened at the Adelphi Theatre on 17 March 1983 where it ran for 156 performances.

Directed by Larry Fuller, with whom Lawrence had worked on Evita, the principal cast also included John Christie, John Bennett, David Firth, Bruce Barry and Judith Bruce.

Despite poor reviews for the show, Lawrence's performance was praised.

== Cast ==
- Camera - John Christie
- Norma-Jean/Marilyn - Stephanie Lawrence
- Paula Strasberg/Foster Parent - Myra Sands
- Jack Warner/Foster Parent - David Shelmerdine
- Louella Parsons/Mrs. Dougherty - Margaret Burton
- Jim Dougherty - Clive Carter
- Mama - Judith Bruce
- Mrs. Miller/Nurse - Shirley Greenwood
- Norma Jean's Mambo Partner - Brad Graham
- Hedda Hopper/Emmeline Snivelli - Marie Lorraine
- Andre De Dienes - Bruce Barry
- Starlets - Diane Simmons
  Lindsey Lomax
  Rossana Dane
- Lee Strasberg/Johnny Hyde - John Bennett
- Harry Cohn - Stanley Fleet
- Darryl Zanuck - Chuck Julian
- Jimmy Fiddler - David Oakley
- Joe Di Maggio - Stuart Milligan
- Arthur Miller - David Firth
- Mr. Miller - Richard Lloyd-Morgan
- Female Wedding Guest - Helen Hembrough
- Male Wedding Guest - Phillip Harrison

== Musical numbers ==
- Did You Know Marilyn Monroe?
- I Am Camera
- Somebody Will Love Me
- What Do We Do With the Girl?
- Can You Hear Me Mama?
- The Most Beautiful Girl of Them All
- 8 x 10 Glossies
- Where Do You Want Me?
- I Never Knew A Girl Like Her Before
- Seeing Other Men
- Come and Get It
- It Happens
- The Man Has Got An Eye
- I Can See Myself Very Clearly
- To Love Somebody
- Then The Town Comes Down on Your Head
- I'm Going Public
- So Happy to See Me
- Who's That Girl?
- How Do You Like It?
- Bigger Than Life
- A Girl Like You Needs A Little Protection
- There's So Much to Do in New York
- Dumb Blonde
- The Wedding
- The Scene Will Play
- Beautiful Child
- It Was Not Meant to Be
- Somewhere a Phone is Ringing

== Also see ==
- Marilyn: An American Fable
- Bombshell
