= The Continuing Saga of the Ageing Orphans =

- Cover art by Jim Fitzpatrick

Compilation album by Thin Lizzy
- Released: 1979
- Recorded: 1971–1973 with redubs in 1977
- Genre: Hard rock, blues rock
- Length: 44:16
- Label: Decca
- Producer: Phil Lynott, Nick Tauber, Frank Rodgers

Thin Lizzy compilation albums chronology
Remembering – Part 1 (1976)	The Continuing Saga of the Ageing Orphans (1979)	The Adventures of Thin Lizzy (1981)

Professional ratings
Review scores
Source	Rating
AllMusic	1.5/5 stars

The Continuing Saga of the Ageing Orphans is a 1979 compilation album by the rock group Thin Lizzy.

Despite ostensibly featuring a selection of songs from the band's first three albums and their rare New Day EP, most of the tracks are in fact different from the originally released versions, having been remixed and altered with newly recorded material specially for this release during Christmas 1977. Of the 11 tracks, only "Mama Nature Said", "The Hero and the Madman" and "Vagabond of the Western World" (all from Vagabonds of the Western World) are the same as their original album counterparts. Midge Ure (of Ultravox) and Gary Moore feature on some of the newly recorded songs. Despite the album's name, it does not include the track "Saga of the Ageing Orphan" from the band's first album.

The album has long been out of print, but all of the altered tracks were re-released as bonus tracks on the 2010 remastered versions of Thin Lizzy, Shades of a Blue Orphanage and Vagabonds of the Western World.

== Track listing ==
All tracks are written by Phil Lynott, except where noted

Side one
No.	Title	Originally from	Length
1.	"Things Ain’t Working Out Down at the Farm"	New Day EP (1971)	3:58
2.	"Buffalo Gal"	Shades of a Blue Orphanage (1972)	5:11
3.	"Sarah"	Shades of a Blue Orphanage	2:48
4.	"Honesty Is No Excuse"	Thin Lizzy (1971)	2:45
5.	"Look What the Wind Blew In"	Thin Lizzy	3:22
6.	"Mama Nature Said"	Vagabonds of the Western World (1973)	4:52

Side two
No.	Title	Originally from	Length
7.	"The Hero and the Madman"	Vagabonds of the Western World	6:08
8.	"Slow Blues" (Lynott, Brian Downey)	Vagabonds of the Western World	4:46
9.	"Dublin"	New Day	2:32
10.	"Brought Down"	Shades of a Blue Orphanage	3:08
11.	"Vagabond of the Western World"	Vagabonds of the Western World	4:46

== Singles ==
- Things Ain't Working Out Down At The Farm/The Rocker/Little Darling – 7-inch EP (1979)

== Personnel ==
Thin Lizzy

- Phil Lynott – bass guitar, vocals, acoustic guitar, keyboards
- Eric Bell – guitars
- Brian Downey – drums, percussion
- Gary Moore – guitars (tracks 1–3, 5, 8–10), vocals (track 10), keyboards (tracks 1, 5, 8–9)

Additional musicians

- Midge Ure – guitar, vocals (tracks 1, 9)
- Kid Jensen – narrator on track 7
- Clodagh Simonds – piano on track 3

== Recordings ==
According to the sleeve notes, "All the tracks were originally recorded between the years 1971–1973. Remixes and alterations were recorded at No. 2 Studio, Decca West Hampstead, Christmas '77." The engineers are listed as Derek Varnals, Martin Haskell, Peter Rynston, Louie Austin and David Grinstead.
