= Remembering – Part 1 =

- Cover art by Jim Fitzpatrick

Compilation album by Thin Lizzy
- Released: August 1976
- Recorded: 1971–1974
- Genre: Hard rock, blues rock
- Length: 40:38
- Label: Decca
- Producer: Nick Tauber, Phil Lynott, Frank Rodgers

Thin Lizzy compilation albums chronology
The Beginning Vol. 12 (1974)	Remembering – Part 1 (1976)	The Continuing Saga of the Ageing Orphans (1978)

Professional ratings
Review scores
Source	Rating
AllMusic	2/5 stars
Collector's Guide to Heavy Metal	7/10

Remembering – Part 1 is a compilation album by rock group Thin Lizzy, one of the first compilations of the band's early years with Eric Bell, released by their record company at that time, Decca Records, in an apparent attempt to cash in on the chart success Lizzy had recently begun enjoying with Vertigo. It includes "Sitamoia" (based on the traditional Irish song Cailleach an Airgid/The Hag with the Money) and "Little Darling", both featuring Gary Moore during his first brief stint with the group, the first of which was previously unreleased. The time frame of the album stretches from 1971 to 1974. The album was issued in the US as Rocker (1971-1974) in 1977 by London Records, with the song "Honesty Is No Excuse" instead of "A Song for While I'm Away".

The album was known simply as Remembering in Germany, where it was released as a 27-track double album.

== Track listings ==
All tracks are written by Phil Lynott, except where indicated

Side one
No.	Title	Writer(s)	Originally from	Length
1.	"Black Boys on the Corner"		B-side to "Whiskey in the Jar" single (1972)	3:22
2.	"A Song for While I'm Away"		Vagabonds of the Western World (1973)	5:08
3.	"Randolph's Tango"		non-album single (1973)	3:45
4.	"Little Girl in Bloom"		Vagabonds of the Western World	3:46
5.	"Sitamoia *"	Brian Downey	previously unreleased	3:25

Side two
No.	Title	Writer(s)	Originally from	Length
6.	"Little Darling"		non-album single (1974)	2:55
7.	"Remembering"		Thin Lizzy (1971)	4:00
8.	"Gonna Creep Up on You"	Eric Bell, Lynott	Vagabonds of the Western World	3:25
9.	"Whiskey in the Jar"	Traditional, arr. Lynott, Bell, Downey	non-album single (1972)	5:40
10.	"The Rocker"	Lynott, Bell, Downey	Vagabonds of the Western World	5:12

1998 US CD edition bonus track
No.	Title	Originally from	Length
6.	"Honesty Is No Excuse"	Thin Lizzy	5:11

- Sitamoia is credited differently in various place, either to Lynott or Downey. Unconfirmed is that Lynott made Downey a birthday gift of the writing credit

=== Remembering (German double LP) ===
- All tracks written by Phil Lynott unless stated.

Side 1

1. "Remembering"
2. "The Rise and Dear Demise of the Funky Nomadic Tribes" (Lynott, Bell, Downey)
3. "Buffalo Gal"
4. "I Don't Want to Forget How to Jive"
5. "Sarah"
6. "Brought Down"

Side 2

1. "Randolph's Tango"
2. "Chatting Today"
3. "Baby Face"
4. "Call the Police"
5. "Shades of a Blue Orphanage"
6. "Broken Dreams" (Lynott, Bell, Downey)
7. "Old Moon Madness"

Side 3

1. "Black Boys on the Corner"
2. "The Friendly Ranger at Clontarf Castle" (Bell, Lynott)
3. "Honesty Is No Excuse"
4. "Diddy Levine"
5. "Ray-Gun" (Bell)
6. "Look What the Wind Blew In"
7. "Sitamoia"

Side 4

1. "Eire"
2. "Return of the Farmers Son"
3. "Clifton Grange Hotel"
4. "Saga of the Ageing Orphan"
5. "Dublin"
6. "Things Ain't Working But Down at the Farm"
7. "Remembering (Part 2)"

(NB Side 4 Track 6 "... But Down ..." is a sleeve error and the song is " ... Out Down ...")

== Personnel ==
Thin Lizzy

- Phil Lynott – bass guitar, vocals, acoustic guitar, associate producer
- Eric Bell – guitars (except tracks 5 & 6)
- Brian Downey – drums, percussion
- Gary Moore – guitars and backing vocals on tracks 5 & 6

Additional musicians

- Fiachra Trench – string arrangement on track 2
- Ivor Raymonde – mellotron on track 6

Production

- Nick Tauber – producer
- Frank Rodgers - executive producer
- Jim Fitzpatrick - cover art
