= The Missing Album =

Studio album by The Noel Redding Band
- Released: 13 June 1995
- Recorded: 1975–1976
- Genre: Folk rock
- Label: Griffin

The Noel Redding Band chronology
Blowin' (1976)	The Missing Album (1995)

The Missing Album is the third and final album by the English-Irish folk rock band, The Noel Redding Band, released in 1995 after their break up.

== Reception ==
Professional ratings
Review scores
Source	Rating
allmusic	2.5/5 stars

Greg Prato's review in allmusic said little about the album's content, noting only that it is easily distinguishable from the work of other bands that Noel Redding had worked with. Prato concluded with a prediction that "only the most extreme Noel Redding fans will be curious to give The Missing Album a spin".

== Track listing ==
No.	Title	Writer(s)	Length
1.	"Lady Madonna"	John Lennon, Paul McCartney	4:29
2.	"In the Night"	Noel Redding	3:33
3.	"One Way Ticket to the Sun"	David Clarke, Redding	3:55
4.	"I'd Rather Go Blind" (previously released on Blowin')	Clarke, Redding	3:32
5.	"Painted Lady"	Clarke, Redding	2:48
6.	"Hold On" (previously released on Blowin')	Clarke	4:52
7.	"Riches to Rags"	Clarke	3:53
8.	"Wish I Could Be With You"	Redding, Les Sampson	2:02
9.	"Champagne Eyes"	Clarke, Redding	3:30
10.	"The Grim Reaper"	Clarke	4:29
11.	"Only Be Alone"	Clarke, Redding	3:40
12.	"I'd Rather Go Blind" (alternate take)	Clarke, Redding	3:00
13.	"Clonakilty Cowboys" (previously released on Clonakilty Cowboys)	Clarke	3:11

== Personnel ==
The Noel Redding Band

- Noel Redding – bass guitar, vocals, guitar, production, liner notes
- David Clarke – vocals, keyboards, piano, organ, clavinet, liner notes
- Eric Bell – guitar, vocals
- Les Sampson – drums, percussion

Additional musicians

- Andy Kealey – vocals
- Robbie Walsh – guitar
- Stanley Schnier – bass guitar
- Don Michael Young – keyboards, piano, organ, clavinet, Moog synthesizers

Additional personnel

- Doctor – production
- Muff Winwood – production
- Phil Ault – engineering
- Mike Day – engineering
- Dave Hunt – engineering
- Steve Marriott – engineering
