= Magic Forest: The Anthology =

Compilation album by Fat Mattress
- Released: 13 June 2006
- Recorded: 1968–1970
- Genre: Folk rock; psychedelic rock; progressive rock; art rock
- Label: Sanctuary, Castle
- Producer: Fat Mattress

Fat Mattress chronology
The Black Sheep of the Family: The Anthology (2000)	Magic Forest: The Anthology (2006)

Magic Forest: The Anthology is a compilation album by English rock band Fat Mattress, released on 13 June 2006 by Sanctuary Records and Castle Communications. It includes both of their albums plus bonus tracks. The album is named after "Magic Forest", a song from the band's self-titled debut album released as a single in 1969.

== Track listing ==
Disc one
No.	Title	Writer(s)	Length
1.	"All Night Drinker"	Neil Landon, Jimmy Leverton	3:14
2.	"I Don't Mind"	Landon, Noel Redding	3:50
3.	"Bright New Way"	Landon, Leverton	3:51
4.	"Petrol Pump Assistant"	Landon, Redding	3:03
5.	"Mr. Moonshine"	Landon, Redding	4:04
6.	"Magic Forest"	Landon, Leverton	3:04
7.	"She Came in the Morning"	Landon	4:01
8.	"Everything's Blue"	Redding	2:47
9.	"Walking Through a Garden"	Redding	3:26
10.	"How Can I Live"	Landon, Redding	4:25
11.	"Little Girl in White"	Redding	4:10
12.	"Eric the Red"	Landon, Leverton, Redding	2:55
13.	"Naturally" (mono single mix)	Landon, Leverton	3:05
14.	"Iridescent Butterfly" (stereo version)	Landon	3:43
15.	"Magic Forest" (mono single mix)	Landon, Leverton	2:57
16.	"Happy My Love"	Landon, Leverton	3:59
17.	"Mr. Moonshine"	Landon, Redding	4:26
18.	"Naturally"	Landon, Leverton	2:57
19.	"Black Sheep of the Family"	Steve Hammond	4:33
20.	"Which Way to Go"	Leverton	3:05
21.	"Hall of Kings"	Landon	5:32

- Tracks 1 to 10 are Fat Mattress album (1969)

Disc two
No.	Title	Writer(s)	Length
1.	"The Storm"	Landon, Leverton	4:11
2.	"Anyway You Want"	Landon, Leverton, Redding	3:47
3.	"Leafy Lanes"	Landon, Leverton	2:48
4.	"Naturally" (album version)	Landon, Leverton	3:02
5.	"Roamin'"	Landon, Leverton	4:22
6.	"Happy My Love"	Landon, Leverton	3:43
7.	"Childhood Dream"	Landon, Leverton	3:23
8.	"She"	Landon	2:32
9.	"Highway"	Landon, Redding	4:24
10.	"At the Ball"	Landon, Redding	4:10
11.	"People"	Landon, Redding	4:00
12.	"Margarita"	Landon, Leverton	4:14
13.	"Cold Wall of Stone"	Jacobs, Landon, Leverton	2:37
14.	"Long Red"	Lansberg, Felix Pappalardi, Ventura, Leslie West	4:23
15.	"Words"	Landon, Leverton	4:14
16.	"The River"	Landon, Leverton	17:10
17.	"Future Days"	Leverton	4:02

- Tracks 1 to 11 are Fat Mattress II album (1970)
