= The O.D's =

The O.D's are a band of considerable repute, having already played live on the radio. The O.D's are an amalgamation of a number of groups.

The members are:

Michael Nicholson - Vocals Brian Reeves - Guitar Richard Barker - Bass & vocals Robin Cieslak - Guitar & vocals Brian Beever - keys / uke / banjo Karl Baron - Drummer

The group draw their influences from the English blues bands who lived and worked in West London & south east during the 1960s. Following their live broadcast on FM radio the group are set to release their new album "Grand Union Connection" which covers modern blues through to a version of " I wanna die easy" previously performed by Josh White.

The group have been advised by legendary producer Nick Tauber who on first listen said "you'd have to be stupid not to like it" in the initial stages of their foray.

Formed in 2010 by lead guitarist Brian Reeves and singer Michael Nicholson the group spent the first 12 months putting together a collection of songs which in early 2011 whilst performing a low key gig secured a live radio performance broadcast live to over 30,000 listeners
