= The Adventures of Thin Lizzy =

1981 compilation album by Thin Lizzy

- Cover art by Martin Asbury

Compilation album by Thin Lizzy
- Released: 1981
- Recorded: 1972–1980
- Genres: Hard rock, blues rock
- Length: 39:31
- Label: Vertigo

Thin Lizzy compilation albums chronology
The Continuing Saga of the Ageing Orphans (1979)	The Adventures of Thin Lizzy (1981)	Lizzy Killers (1981)

The Adventures of Thin Lizzy is a compilation album by the rock band Thin Lizzy, released in the United Kingdom and Ireland in 1981. It features songs released as singles from 1972 to 1980.

== Track listing ==
All tracks written by Phil Lynott unless stated.

Side one

1. "Whiskey in the Jar" (Trad. arr. Lynott, Eric Bell, Brian Downey) - 3:40
2. "Wild One" - 3:29
3. "Jailbreak" - 4:01
4. "The Boys Are Back in Town" - 4:27
5. "Don't Believe a Word" - 2:18
6. "Dancing in the Moonlight (It's Caught Me in Its Spotlight)" - 3:26

Side two

7. "Waiting for an Alibi" - 3:28
8. "Do Anything You Want To" - 3:50
9. "Sarah" (Lynott, Moore) - 3:21
10. "Chinatown" (Downey, Scott Gorham, Lynott, Snowy White) - 3:37
11. "Killer on the Loose" - 3:54

== Personnel ==
Thin Lizzy

- Phil Lynott – bass guitar, vocals, acoustic guitar on track 2, arrangements
- Brian Downey – drums, percussion
- Eric Bell – guitar on track 1
- Scott Gorham – guitar, except tracks 1 and 9
- Brian Robertson – guitar on tracks 2–5
- Gary Moore – guitar on tracks 7–9
- Snowy White – guitar on tracks 10 and 11

Production

- Gordon Fordyce - engineer
- Kit Woolven - engineer, arrangements

== Charts ==
Chart (1981)	Peak position
UK Albums (Official Charts)	6

== Certifications ==
Region	Certification	Certified units/sales
United Kingdom (BPI)	Gold	100,000^{^}
^{^} Shipments figures based on certification alone.
