= Be Proud Be Loud (Be Heard) =

Single by Toyah
- B-side: "Laughing with the Fools"
- Released: August 1982
- Genre: New wave
- Length: 3:20
- Label: Safari
- Songwriters: Toyah Willcox; Joel Bogen
- Producer: Nick Tauber

Toyah singles chronology
"Ieya" (1982)	"Be Proud Be Loud (Be Heard)" (1982)	"Rebel Run" (1983)

"Be Proud Be Loud (Be Heard)" is a song by the English new wave band Toyah, fronted by Toyah Willcox, released as a single in 1982 by Safari Records. It was a top-40 chart success in the UK and Ireland.

== Background ==
The track was written by Toyah Willcox and Joel Bogen, and produced by Nick Tauber. Toyah explained that the song was written "for fans that were feeling they weren't being seen and weren't being heard, and that they stood away from society because they felt different". She reflected that she wanted to write "something that was up and happy, and that we could give back to the fans. I was getting so many letters back then from fans who had been suspended from school, who'd been in permanent detention, who were banned from leaving their home because they dyed their hair bright colours like me. So, we thought, why don't you just be proud, be loud, be heard".

The song was released in August 1982 as a 7" vinyl single and a 12" transparent picture disc. The song was a Top 40 success in October 1982, peaking at number 30 and 29 in the UK and Ireland, respectively. Toyah promoted it with performances in British TV shows Razzmatazz and Crackerjack!, among others, as well as Discoring on Italian television. The single and its B-side "Laughing with the Fools" were not included on an album at the time, though both would eventually be included on the 2005 reissue of Love Is the Law, while the title track became the lead song on the 1998 compilation The Best of Toyah: Proud, Loud & Heard, hand-picked by Toyah Willcox herself.

== Track listing ==
- 7" single

A. "Be Proud Be Loud (Be Heard)" (Toyah Willcox, Joel Bogen)
B. "Laughing with the Fools" (Willcox, Bogen)

== Personnel ==
- Toyah Willcox – vocals
- Joel Bogen – guitar
- Adrian Lee – keyboards
- Phil Spalding – bass
- Preston Heyman – drums

== Charts ==
Chart (1982)	Peak position
Irish Singles (IRMA)	29
UK Singles (Official Charts Company)	30
UK Independent Singles	3
