= The Noel Redding Band =

English-Irish folk rock supergroup (1974-1978)

- Also known as: The Clonakilty Cowboys
- Origin: County Cork, Ireland
- Genres: Folk rock
- Years active: 1974–1978
- Label: RCA
- Past members: Noel Redding; Dave Clarke; Eric Bell; Les Sampson; Dave Donovan

The Noel Redding Band (also known as The Clonakilty Cowboys after the title of its first album, Clonakilty Cowboys) was an English-Irish folk rock supergroup that was formed in Clonakilty, County Cork, in 1974. Comprising the bass guitarist, rhythm guitarist and vocalist Noel Redding (formerly of The Jimi Hendrix Experience, Fat Mattress and Road), the vocalist and keyboard player Dave Clarke, the lead guitarist Eric Bell (formerly of Thin Lizzy and Them) and the drummer Les Sampson (formerly of Road), the band released two albums – Clonakilty Cowboys (1975) and Blowin' (1976) – before disbanding in 1978.

== History ==
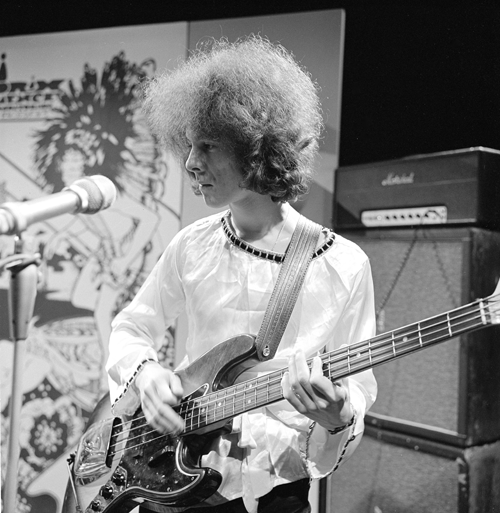
Noel Redding in 1967

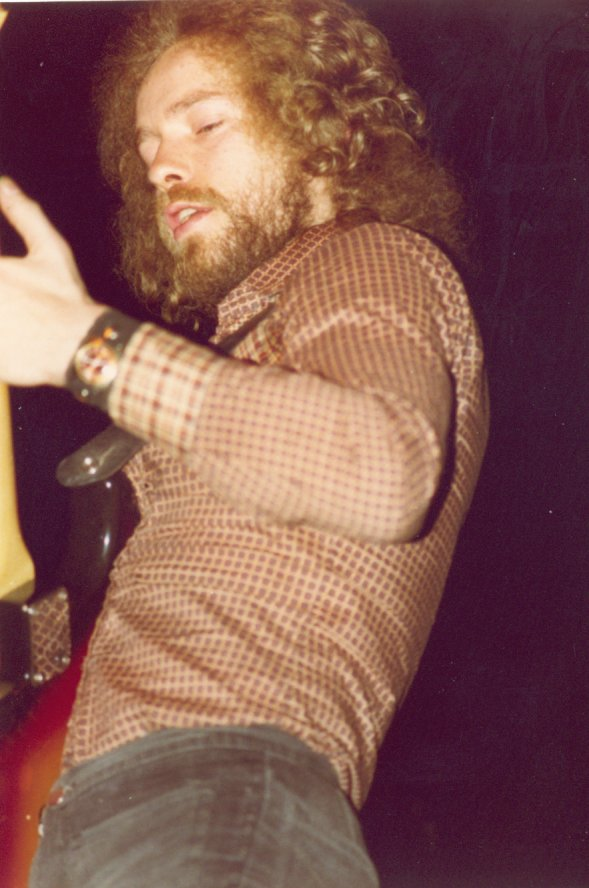
Eric Bell in 1972

After Fat Mattress split up in 1970, Redding joined the Los Angeles-based group Road, which released an album, Road, before disbanding in 1972. Following this, Redding decided to form an eponymous band, again working with Road's drummer Sampson. Redding also hired Clarke and, later, Bell, who at first expressed doubts about the quality of Redding's written material.

During a break following the release of a second album in 1976, Sampson left and was replaced by Dave Donovan (ex-Roy Wood). This incarnation of the band toured Holland and disbanded in late 1978.

Like other bands formed by Redding, it was relatively short-lived, releasing two albums in 1975 and 1976 before splitting up in 1978. Tracks recorded for a third, unreleased album were later released as The Missing Album on Mouse Records.

Redding once suggested in an interview that The Clonakilty Cowboys was the band which gave him "the most pleasure".

== Band members ==
- Noel Redding – bass guitar, rhythm guitar, lead vocals (1974–78)
- Dave Clarke – lead vocals, keyboards, piano, organ, clavinet (1974–78)
- Eric Bell – lead guitar, backing vocals (1974–78)
- Les Sampson – drums, percussion (1974–76)
- Dave Donovan – drums, percussion (1976–78)

== Discography ==
- Clonakilty Cowboys (1975)
- Blowin' (1976)
- The Missing Album (1995)
