= Fat Mattress II =

Studio album by Fat Mattress
- Released: 1970
- Recorded: 1969
- Genre: Folk rock; psychedelic rock; progressive rock; art rock
- Length: 40:34
- Label: Polydor
- Producer: Fat Mattress

Fat Mattress chronology
Fat Mattress (1969)	Fat Mattress II (1970)	The Black Sheep of the Family: The Anthology (2000)

Singles from Fat Mattress II
- 1. "Naturally" Released: 1969; 2. "Highway" Released: 1970

Fat Mattress II is the second and final studio album by English rock band Fat Mattress, released in 1970.

== Reception ==
Professional ratings
Review scores
Source	Rating
AllMusic	2.5/5 stars

Compared with the band's debut self-titled album, Fat Mattress II was a commercial failure, not appearing in any major record charts. The album was described, in a review for music website AllMusic, by critic Richie Unterberger as "similar to, but also inferior to, their debut." Unterberger went on to suggest that "The songs aren't even up to the debut's modest standard, however, and the lingering feeling is that of a tolerable but fairly anonymous '60s-turning-into-'70s band with a Transatlantic feel."

== Track listing ==
Original LP
No.	Title	Writer(s)	Length
1.	"The Storm"	Neil Landon, Jimmy Leverton	4:13
2.	"Anyway You Want"	Landon, Leverton	3:47
3.	"Leafy Lane"	Landon, Leverton	2:50
4.	"Naturally"	Landon, Leverton	3:03
5.	"Roamin'"	Landon, Leverton	4:25
6.	"Happy My Love"	Landon, Leverton	3:43
7.	"Childhood Dream"	Landon, Leverton	3:20
8.	"She"	Landon	2:36
9.	"Highway"	Landon, Noel Redding	4:24
10.	"At the Ball"	Landon, Redding	4:13
11.	"People"	Landon, Redding	4:00

CD bonus tracks (Sequel NEXCD197, 1992)
No.	Title	Writer(s)	Length
1.	"Hall of Kings"	Landon	5:32
2.	"Long Red"	West, Pappalardi, Landsberg, Ventura	4:21
3.	"Words"	Landon, Leverton	4:12
4.	"The River"	Landon, Leverton	17:09

CD bonus tracks (Esoteric eclec2135, 2009)
No.	Title	Writer(s)	Length
1.	"Margarita"	Landon, Leverton	4:12
2.	"Cold Wall of Stone"	Landon, Leverton, Jacobs	2:36
3.	"Long Red"	West, Pappalardi, Landsberg, Ventura	4:21
4.	"Words"	Landon, Leverton	4:12
5.	"The River"	Landon, Leverton	17:09
6.	"Future Days"	Leverton	4:02

== Personnel ==
Fat Mattress

- Neil Landon – vocals, production
- Jimmy Leverton – bass, vocals, production
- Eric Dillon – drums, production
- Steve Hammond – guitar, production
- Mick Weaver – keyboards, production

Additional personnel

- Noel Redding – guitar & vocals on tracks 2, 4, 5, 6, 10, & 11
- George Chkiantz – engineering
- Roger Wilkinson – engineering on "The Storm" and "Highway"
- Gered Mankowitz – photography

== Release history ==
Region	Date	Label	Format	Catalog	Ref.
United Kingdom	1970	Polydor	LP	2383 025	
Germany	1970	Polydor	LP	2383 025	
United States	1970	Atco	LP	SD 33-347	
United Kingdom	1992	Sequel	CD	NEXCD197	
United Kingdom	29 June 2009	Esoteric	CD	2135	
