= Remembering =

Remembering may refer to:

- Recall (memory), the retrieval of events or information from the past
- Remembering (Grant Green album), 1961
- Remembering – Part 1, a compilation album by rock group Thin Lizzy
