= The Vow (song) =

Single by Toyah

from the album Love Is the Law
- B-side: "I Explode"; "Haunted"
- Released: November 1983
- Genre: New wave
- Length: 3:42
- Label: Safari
- Songwriter(s): Toyah Willcox; Joel Bogen; Phil Spalding
- Producer(s): Nick Tauber

Toyah singles chronology
"Rebel Run" (1983)	"The Vow" (1983)	"Don't Fall in Love (I Said)" (1985)

"The Vow" is a song by the English new wave band Toyah, fronted by Toyah Willcox. It was released in 1983 to promote the album Love Is the Law.

== Background ==
The track was written by Toyah Willcox, Joel Bogen and Phil Spalding, and produced by Nick Tauber. It was released as the second and final single from Love Is the Law and also was the final single released by Toyah as a band. It failed to match the success of its predecessors, peaking at number 50 in the UK, despite appearances on several television shows.

The B-side on the 7" single was an album track "I Explode" and the 12" single featured an additional non-album B-side, "Haunted", inspired by a breakup of a very long relationship. The latter appeared on the 2005 reissue of Love Is the Law, and the compilation album The Safari Singles Collection Part 2: 1981–1983, released the same year.

"The Vow" didn't have an actual music video, but a special clip picturing Toyah walking in a park set to the song was produced by ITV for the children's programme The Saturday Show.

== Track listing ==
- 7" single

A. "The Vow" (Toyah Willcox, Joel Bogen, Phil Spalding) – 3:42
B. "I Explode" (Willcox, Bogen) – 4:07

- 12" single

A. "The Vow" (Willcox, Bogen, Spalding) – 3:42
B1. "I Explode" (Willcox, Bogen) – 4:07
B2. "Haunted" (Willcox, Simon Darlow) – 3:27

- Digital single
1. "The Vow" (Alternate Mix) (Willcox, Bogen, Spalding) – 3:46
2. "I Explode" (Willcox, Bogen) – 4:10
3. "Haunted" (Willcox, Simon Darlow) – 3:42

== Personnel ==
- Toyah Willcox – vocals
- Joel Bogen – guitar
- Brad Lang – bass
- Andy Duncan – drums
- Simon Darlow – keyboards

== Charts ==
Chart (1983)	Peak position
UK Singles (Official Charts Company)	50
UK Independent Singles	17
