= Rebel Run =

Single by Toyah

from the album Love Is the Law
- B-side: "To the Mountains High"; "Baptised in Fire"
- Released: September 1983
- Genre: New wave
- Length: 3:13
- Label: Safari
- Songwriter(s): Toyah Willcox; Simon Darlow
- Producer(s): Nick Tauber

Toyah singles chronology
"Be Proud Be Loud (Be Heard)" (1982)	"Rebel Run" (1983)	"The Vow" (1983)

Music video
- "Rebel Run" on YouTube

"Rebel Run" is a song by the English new wave band Toyah, fronted by Toyah Willcox. It was released in 1983 to promote the album Love Is the Law and was a top-30 chart success in the UK.

== Background ==
The track was written by Toyah Willcox and Simon Darlow, and produced by Nick Tauber. It was the lead single from Love Is the Law and reached number 24 on the UK Singles Chart, spending a total of five weeks on the chart. Toyah appeared on several television programmes to promote the song, including an outdoor performance filmed at Alton Towers for the TV show Hold Tight, when the band also performed "Ieya". The 7" single B-side was "To the Mountains High", and the 12" single featured an additional song, "Baptised in Fire". Both of these tracks appeared on the 2005 reissue of Love Is the Law, as well as the compilation album The Safari Singles Collection Part 2: 1981–1983, released the same year.

== Music video ==
The song's music video pictures Toyah as a character in a video game, wearing an outfit based on American football.

== Track listing ==
- 7" single

A. "Rebel Run" (Toyah Willcox, Simon Darlow) – 3:13
B. "To the Mountains High" (Willcox, Joel Bogen, Darlow) – 3:33

- 12" single

A. "Rebel Run" (Willcox, Darlow) – 3:13
B1. "To the Mountains High" (Willcox, Bogen, Darlow) – 3:33
B2. "Baptised in Fire" (Willcox) – 2:46

- 10" single (2024)

A1. "Rebel Run" (Extended)
A2. "Love Is the Law" (Alternate)
B1. "Rebel Run" (Instrumental)
B2. "To the Mountains High"
B3. "Baptised in Fire"

== Personnel ==
- Toyah Willcox – vocals
- Joel Bogen – guitar
- Brad Lang – bass
- Andy Duncan – drums
- Simon Darlow – keyboards

== Charts ==
Chart (1983)	Peak position
UK Singles (Official Charts Company)	24
UK Independent Singles	3

Chart (2024)	Peak position
UK Vinyl Singles (Official Charts Company)	1
UK Physical Singles (Official Charts Company)	30
