= Dave Clarke discography =

Dave Clarke discography may refer to:

- The discography of Dave Clarke (musician)
- The discography of Dave Clarke (DJ)
