= Road (Road album) =

Studio album by Road
- Released: 1972
- Recorded: March 1972
- Studio: Record Plant Studios, Los Angeles, California
- Genre: Hard rock, psychedelic rock
- Length: 39:44
- Label: Natural Resources, Rare Earth
- Producer: Road, Tom Wilson, Murray Roman (exec.)

Road is the only studio album by American hard rock band Road. Released in 1972, and split up at the same year. The song "My Friends" was originally recorded by bassist Noel Redding's previous band, Fat Mattress, but went unreleased at the time, making the Road version the first published recording of the song.

== Reception ==
Professional ratings
Review scores
Source	Rating
AllMusic	3/5 stars

In a review for AllMusic, critic Sean Westergaard criticised the performances of each musician, as well as the songwriting and production quality, summarizing the album as "little more than warmed-up post-Hendrix hard rock, heavy on the wah pedal."

Nevertheless, as of 2024, copies have sold on Discogs.com for as high as $100.

== Track listing ==
Road track listing
No.	Title	Writer(s)	Lead vocalist	Length
1.	"I'm Trying"	Rod Richards	Richards	6:33
2.	"I'm Going Down to the Country"	Noel Redding	Redding	2:42
3.	"Mushroom Man"	Richards, Leslie Sampson	Sampson	4:08
4.	"Man Dressed in Red"	Redding	Redding	7:00
5.	"Spaceship Earth"	Richards	Richards	3:28
6.	"My Friends"	Redding	Redding	6:17
7.	"Road"	Richards	Richards	9:29

== Personnel ==
Road

- Noel Redding – bass, vocals, production
- Rod Richards – guitar, vocals, artwork, production
- Leslie Sampson – drums, vocals, percussion, production

Additional personnel

- Murray Roman – executive production
- Tom Wilson – production
- Bob Hughes – engineering
- Doug Graves – engineering assistance
- Rod Dyer – graphic design
- Ron Raffaelli – photography
