= Road (American band) =

American hard rock band

- Origin: Los Angeles, California, USA
- Genres: Hard rock, psychedelic rock
- Years active: 1970–1972
- Labels: Natural Resources, Rare Earth
- Spinoffs: The Noel Redding Band
- Past members: Noel Redding; Rod Richards; Leslie Sampson

Road was an American hard rock band that formed in Los Angeles, California in 1970. Comprising bassist/vocalist Noel Redding (previously of The Jimi Hendrix Experience and Fat Mattress), guitarist/vocalist Rod Richards (formerly of Rare Earth) and drummer/vocalist Leslie Sampson, the band released one album, Road, in 1972.

== History ==
Road was formed in 1970, after Redding left Fat Mattress and Richards left Rare Earth. The band recorded their self-titled album at the Record Plant Studios in Los Angeles, California in 1972, the album was released later in the year before the group disbanded. In the brief time they were together, Redding and Sampson participated in the jam sessions that resulted in Randy California's 1972 Kapt. Kopter and the (Fabulous) Twirly Birds album. Following the Road, Redding and Sampson formed The Noel Redding Band, while Richards went on to a solo career. Sampson also joined Stray Dog, played in The Gas in the early 80s and Sally Barker And The Rhythm and The Pirates in the 90s.

== Band members ==
- Noel Redding – bass, vocals
- Rod Richards – guitar, vocals
- Leslie Sampson – drums, vocals

== Discography ==
- Road (1972)
