= Fat Mattress (album) =

Studio album by Fat Mattress
- Released: 15 August 1969
- Recorded: 1968–1969
- Genre: Folk rock; psychedelic rock; progressive rock; art rock
- Length: 35:30
- Label: Polydor, Atco
- Producer: Fat Mattress

Fat Mattress chronology
Fat Mattress (1969)	Fat Mattress II (1970)

Singles from Fat Mattress
- 1. "Magic Forest" Released: 1969

Fat Mattress is the debut self-titled studio album by English rock band Fat Mattress, released on 15 August 1969.

== Background ==
Fat Mattress was formed in late-1968 by vocalist Neil Landon and guitarist and vocalist Noel Redding, who was then playing bass with the popular psychedelic rock band The Jimi Hendrix Experience. Landon and Redding had already written a number of songs for Landon's cancelled solo project and, with the recruitment of bassist Jim Leverton and drummer Eric Dillon, completed writing and began recording their first material. The self-titled debut was completed the next year, and was released in the United Kingdom by Polydor Records on 15 August and in the United States by Atco Records in October. In promotion of the album, the band also released their debut single, "Magic Forest", which reached number 11 in the Netherlands.

Fat Mattress was later reissued in 1992 by Sequel Records featuring five new songs, all of which were later included on the 2000 compilation album The Black Sheep of the Family: The Anthology (which also contained three more previously unreleased songs); Castle Communications subsequently re-released the 15-track reissue on 5 March 1996 under the title One. The album was reissued again on 29 June 2009 by Esoteric Recordings with eight bonus tracks, all of which had already appeared on The Black Sheep of the Family anthology.

== Reception ==
Professional ratings
Review scores
Source	Rating
AllMusic	3/5 stars

The debut album by Fat Mattress was a minor commercial success, charting at number 134 on the American Billboard 200 albums chart (then known as the Pop Albums chart). The album was described, in a review for AllMusic, by critic Richie Unterberger as "passable, pleasant late-'60s psychedelia with a far lighter touch than the hard bluesy psychedelic rock Redding played with Hendrix." Unterberger went on to suggest that the album is "often like an amalgam of the Byrds, Buffalo Springfield, Moby Grape, and Love, with some passing nods to British psychedelia by Traffic [...], the Move, and the Small Faces; there's even a bit of a Monkees-go-spacy feel to 'I Don't Mind.'"

== Track listing ==
Original LP
No.	Title	Writer(s)	Lead vocalist(s)	Length
1.	"All Night Drinker"	Neil Landon, Jim Leverton	Landon and Leverton	3:18
2.	"I Don't Mind"	Landon, Noel Redding	Redding and Landon	3:51
3.	"Bright New Way"	Landon, Leverton	Leverton	3:48
4.	"Petrol Pump Assistant"	Landon, Redding	Landon	3:01
5.	"Mr. Moonshine"	Landon, Redding	Landon and Redding	4:04
6.	"Magic Forest"	Landon, Leverton	Leverton and Landon	3:05
7.	"She Came in the Morning"	Landon	Landon	3:47
8.	"Everything's Blue"	Redding	Landon	2:50
9.	"Walking Through a Garden"	Redding	Redding	3:20
10.	"How Can I Live"	Landon, Redding	Landon, Redding, and Leverton	4:26
Total length:				35:30

1992 and 1996 reissues
No.	Title	Writer(s)	Lead vocalist(s)	Length
11.	"Little Girl in White"	Redding	Redding	4:08
12.	"Margarita"	Landon, Leverton	Leverton and Landon	4:14
13.	"Which Way to Go"	Leverton	Leverton	3:03
14.	"Future Days"	Leverton	Leverton and Landon	4:02
15.	"Cold Wall of Stone"	Jeanette Jacobs, Landon, Leverton	Landon	2:36
Total length:				54:33

2009 reissue
No.	Title	Writer(s)	Lead vocalist(s)	Length
11.	"Naturally"	Landon, Leverton		3:02
12.	"Iridescent Butterfly"	Landon	Landon	3:42
13.	"Magic Forest" (mono single version)	Landon, Leverton	Leverton and Landon	2:57
14.	"Little Girl in White"	Redding	Redding	4:08
15.	"Eric the Red"	Landon, Leverton, Redding	none	2:57
16.	"Black Sheep of the Family"	Steve Hammond		4:29
17.	"Hall of Kings"	Landon		5:34
18.	"Which Way to Go" (performed by Jim Leverton)	Leverton	Leverton

== Personnel ==
Fat Mattress

- Neil Landon – vocals, production
- Noel Redding – guitar, vocals, production
- Jimmy Leverton – bass, vocals, harpsichord, organ, production
- Eric Dillon – drums, tuned percussion, production

Guest musicians

- Mitch Mitchell – drums, percussion on "How Can I Live"
- Chris Wood – flute on "All Night Drinker"
- Jimi Hendrix – percussion on "How Can I Live"

Additional personnel

- George Chkiantz – engineering
- Gered Mankowitz – photography
- Paragon Publicity – sleeve design
- Adrian Morgan – liner notes

== Release history ==
Region	Date	Label	Format	Catalog	Ref.
United Kingdom	15 August 1969	Polydor	LP	583,056	
United States	October 1969	Atco	LP	SD 33-309	
Canada	1969	Polydor	LP	543,075	
Germany	1969	Polydor	LP	184,305	
United Kingdom	1992	Sequel	CD	1019	
United Kingdom	5 March 1996	Castle	CD	NEX196	
United Kingdom	29 June 2009	Esoteric	CD	2134	
