= Blowin' (album) =

Studio album by The Noel Redding Band
- Released: 1976
- Recorded: 1976
- Genre: Folk rock
- Length: 36:03
- Label: RCA
- Producer: Noel Redding

The Noel Redding Band chronology
Clonakilty Cowboys (1975)	Blowin' (1976)	The Missing Album (1995)

Blowin' is the second album by the English-Irish folk rock band The Noel Redding Band, released in 1976.

== Reception ==
Professional ratings
Review scores
Source	Rating
Allmusic	3/5 stars

In a review for allmusic, the critic William Ruhlmann suggested that "The album rocked harder than its predecessor, Clonakilty Cowboys," going on to criticise the band as "a faceless, nearly generic rock group with a rusty-voiced singer mouthing rock & roll clichés and a standard-issue guitarist."

== Track listing ==
No.	Title	Writer(s)	Length
1.	"Back on the Road Again"	David Clarke, Noel Redding	3:15
2.	"California"	Clarke, Redding	3:24
3.	"Yes It's Alright"	Redding	3:15
4.	"I'd Rather Go Blind"	Clarke, Redding	3:20
5.	"You Make Me Feel So Good"	Redding	4:45
6.	"Take It Easy"	Clarke, Redding	3:35
7.	"Love and War"	Eric Bell	3:29
8.	"Before the Photograph"	Clarke	2:45
9.	"I'm Just a Sinner"	Bell, Clarke	3:45
10.	"Hold On"	Clarke	4:30
Total length:			36:03

== Personnel ==
The Noel Redding Band

- Noel Redding – bass guitar, vocals, guitar
- David Clarke – vocals, keyboards, piano
- Eric Bell – guitar, vocals
- Les Sampson – drums, percussion

Additional personnel

- Andy Kealey – vocals
- Stanley Schnier – bass guitar
- Red Young – keyboards, piano, organ, clavinet, Moog synthesizers
