= Running Wild (album) =

Studio album by Girlschool
- Released: 12 August 1985
- Recorded: December 1984 – February 1985
- Studios: AIR (London, UK); Battery (London, UK); The Manor (Shipton-on-Cherwell, England)
- Genre: Heavy metal
- Length: 37:48
- Label: Mercury
- Producer: Nick Tauber

Girlschool chronology
Play Dirty (1983)	Running Wild (1985)	Nightmare at Maple Cross (1986)

Singles from Running Wild
- 1. "Running Wild" Released: 1985

Professional ratings
Review scores
Source	Rating
AllMusic	2/5 stars
Collector's Guide to Heavy Metal	3/10
Kerrang!	2.5/5 stars

Running Wild is the fifth studio album by the British heavy metal band Girlschool, released on Mercury Records in 1985.

It is the only studio work released as a five-piece group by Girlschool, after original lead guitarist Kelly Johnson had left the band. Vocals duties on the album are shared by Jackie Bodimead and Kim McAuliffe.

Running Wild was released only in America. It was produced by Nick Tauber, previously known for his work with Thin Lizzy, Marillion, and Toyah.

"Do You Love Me?" is a cover of the song from Kiss' album Destroyer (1976).

== Track listing ==
Side one
No.	Title	Writer(s)	Length
1.	"Let Me Go"	Kim McAuliffe, Jackie Bodimead, Cris Bonacci	3:48
2.	"Running Wild"	McAuliffe, Bodimead, Bonacci	4:40
3.	"Do You Love Me?" (KISS cover)	Paul Stanley, Kim Fowley, Bob Ezrin	3:19
4.	"Something for Nothing"	McAuliffe, Bodimead, Bonacci, Denise Dufort, Gil Weston-Jones	3:18
5.	"Are You Ready?"	McAuliffe, Bodimead, Bonacci, Dufort, Weston-Jones	3:37

Side two
No.	Title	Writer(s)	Length
6.	"Nowhere to Run"	McAuliffe, Bodimead, Bonacci	3:43
7.	"I Want You Back"	McAuliffe, Bodimead, Bonacci	4:33
8.	"Nasty Nasty"	McAuliffe, Bodimead, Bonacci, Dufort, Weston-Jones	2:46
9.	"Love Is a Lie"	McAuliffe, Bodimead, Bonacci, Dufort, Weston-Jones	3:09
10.	"Can't You See?"	McAuliffe, Bodimead, Bonacci, Dufort, Weston-Jones	4:55

== Personnel ==
Band members

- Jackie Bodimead – lead and backing vocals, keyboards
- Cris Bonacci – lead guitar
- Kim McAulliffe – rhythm guitar, backing vocals; lead vocals on tracks 3 and 8
- Gil Weston-Jones – bass
- Denise Dufort – drums

Production

- Nick Tauber – producer
- Paul O'Duffy – engineer, mixing
- Neil Kernon – remixing of tracks 1, 2, 6
