= Love Is the Law (Toyah album) =

Studio album by Toyah
- Released: 24 October 1983
- Recorded: 1983
- Studio: Marquee Studios, London
- Genre: New wave
- Length: 39:33
- Label: Safari
- Producer: Nick Tauber

Toyah chronology
Warrior Rock: Toyah on Tour (1982)	Love Is the Law (1983)	Toyah! Toyah! Toyah! All the Hits (1984)

Singles from Love Is the Law
- 1. "Rebel Run" Released: September 1983; 2. "The Vow" Released: November 1983

Love Is the Law is the fifth and final studio album by British new wave band Toyah, fronted by Toyah Willcox, released in 1983 by Safari Records. It reached number 28 in the UK Albums Chart and included the top-40 hit single "Rebel Run". It was the last album to be released by the band before singer Willcox embarked on a solo career and retained 'Toyah' as her stage name.

== Background ==
Willcox said the making of the album was the happiest period of her life. She reflected that "in 1983 everything was going right. I was starring in a stage play called Trafford Tanzi, which won me especially huge critical acclaim, and I was about to star in a film, The Ebony Tower with Lord Laurence Olivier just as soon as the album was finished. Because my schedule was incredibly full, the band moved into my house in Finchley, London, where we transformed my gym into a makeshift recording studio to pre-write and programme all the material in the daytime. I'd then go to the theatre for five o'clock and meet the band at the Marquee Studios to do the main recording of the vocals after midnight. It was a killer timetable but I loved it with a passion. (...) Sometimes my head would be racing so much that the only way to get me to calm down was to give me a sleeping pill. This is not something I would readily admit, but it was the only way the producer could get me to sit long enough to finish a track and is the reason "Rebel of Love" and "Martian Cowboy" sound so relaxed for a Toyah song!"

The phrase "love is the law" is from The Book of the Law, the central sacred text of Thelema, written (or received) by Aleister Crowley. "I was never a fan of what he represented, which was mainly dark, devious and debauched, but I thought the phrase 'Love Is the Law' was possibly one of the most beautiful to ever be uttered because it crosses every social and tribal divide", she said. The title track features guest vocals from Toyah fans camping outside the recording studio, who were spontaneously invited in to chant "love is the law" in the song's chorus. One of them inspired the ballad "Martian Cowboy". "I Explode" was inspired by the idea that Crowley was so powerful as a Satanic person that he managed to explode and disappear, and is "about intense emotions that destroy the essence of who you are". Cover photography was taken by John Swannell.

== Release and promotion ==
The album was promoted by two singles: the uptempo "Rebel Run" which was a Top 40 hit and the ballad "The Vow" which only peaked at number 50. The album itself was moderately successful and reached number 28 in the UK Albums Chart. It was supported with the Rebel Run Tour which ran across England in November and December 1983.

Love Is the Law was first released on CD in 2005 with five additional bonus tracks, including B-sides and the standalone single "Be Proud Be Loud (Be Heard)". In 2013, Toyah embarked on the Love Is the Law & More tour to commemorate the 30th anniversary of the album.

In November 2024, Love Is the Law was re-issued by Cherry Red Records in an expanded 2 CD+DVD package, with previously unreleased demo versions.

== Track listing ==
=== Original release ===
All songs by Toyah Willcox and Joel Bogen, except where indicated.

Side one

1. "Broken Diamonds" – 4:05
2. "I Explode" – 4:09
3. "Rebel of Love" – 3:42
4. "Rebel Run" (Willcox, Simon Darlow) – 3:11
5. "Martian Cowboy" (Willcox, Bogen, Darlow, Phil Spalding) – 4:40

Side two

6. "Dreamscape" – 5:04
7. "Time Is Ours" – 3:38
8. "Love Is the Law" (Willcox, Bogen, Darlow, Spalding) – 3:09
9. "Remember" (Willcox, Bogen, Darlow) – 4:08
10. "The Vow" (Willcox, Bogen, Spalding) – 3:47

2005 CD edition bonus tracks

11. "Be Proud, Be Loud (Be Heard)" – 3:30
12. "Laughing with the Fools" – 4:03
13. "To the Mountains High" – 3:36
14. "Baptised in Fire" (Willcox) – 2:45
15. "Haunted" (Willcox, Darlow) – 3:39

=== 2024 expanded deluxe edition ===
CD one

1. "Broken Diamonds" – 4:08
2. "I Explode" – 4:10
3. "Rebel of Love" – 3:45
4. "Rebel Run" – 3:15
5. "Martian Cowboy" – 4:45
6. "Dreamscape" – 5:06
7. "Time Is Ours" – 3:39
8. "Love Is the Law" – 3:09
9. "Remember" – 4:09
10. "The Vow" – 3:52

Bonus Tracks

11. "To the Mountains High" – 3:37
12. "Baptised in Fire" – 2:49
13. "Haunted" – 3:42
14. "Rebel Run" (Extended) – 5:46
15. "Love Is the Law" (Alternate) – 3:25
16. "Be Proud Be Loud (Be Heard)" – 3:35
17. "Laughing with the Fools" – 4:05
18. "City People" (Outtake) – 3:34
19. "Ieya 1982" (Single Version) – 5:25
20. "I Believe in Father Christmas" – 2:41

CD two

Rare & Archive Material

1. "Broken Diamonds" (Instrumental) – 4:19
2. "I Explode" (Instrumental) – 4:28
3. "Rebel of Love" (Instrumental) – 3:37
4. "Rebel Run" (Instrumental) – 3:19
5. "Martian Cowboy" (Instrumental) – 4:26
6. "Dreamscape" (Instrumental) – 4:43
7. "Time Is Ours" (Instrumental) – 4:02
8. "Love Is the Law" (Instrumental) – 3:03
9. "Remember" (Instrumental) – 4:22
10. "The Vow" (Instrumental) – 3:47
11. "I Explode" (Alternate Mix) – 4:17
12. "Martian Cowboy" (Alternate Mix) – 4:30
13. "The Vow" (Alternate Mix) – 3:46
14. "Rebel Run" (Alternate Mix) – 3:16
15. "Viva Riot" (Rough Mix) – 2:51
16. "Haunted" (Home Demo) – 3:54
17. "Rock & Pop" (Portastudio Demo) – 3:46
18. "New Home" (Portastudio Demo) – 2:39
19. "Koo" (Portastudio Demo) – 3:02
20. "Miserable" (Portastudio Demo) – 2:25
21. "Stone" (Portastudio Demo) – 3:07

DVD

Toyah Interviews 2024

1. "Creating Love Is the Law"
2. "Track by Track Commentary"

Live in London 2018

3. "Broken Diamonds"
4. "I Explode"
5. "Martian Cowboy"

Promo Video

6. "Rebel Run"

BBC Television Performances

7. "Be Proud Be Loud (Be Heard)" (Saturday Superstore)
8. "Good Morning Universe" (Saturday Superstore)
9. "Be Proud Be Loud (Be Heard)" (Top of the Pops)
10. "Be Proud Be Loud (Be Heard)" (Crackerjack)
11. "The Vow" (The Russell Harty Show)
12. "Rebel Run" (Saturday Superstore)
13. "The Vow" (Saturday Superstore)
14. "The Vow" (Crackerjack)

== Personnel ==
Band members

- Toyah Willcox – vocals
- Joel Bogen – guitar
- Simon Darlow – keyboards
- Adrian Lee – keyboards on track 11 and 12
- Phil Spalding – bass on tracks 7, 8, 9, 11 and 12
- Brad Lang – bass on tracks 1, 2, 4, 6, 10, 13–15
- Andy Duncan – drums and percussion

Additional musicians

- Preston Heyman – drums on track 11 and 12
- Denys Darlow – string arrangements and conductor on track 10

Production

- Nick Tauber – producer
- Simon Darlow, Joel Bogen – arrangements
- Simon Hanhart, Phil Harding, Mark Wade – engineers
- Andy Lovell, Mike Higgs, Mike Duffy, Rob Waldron – assistant engineers

== Charts ==
Chart (1983)	Peak position
UK Albums (Official Charts Company)	28
UK Independent Albums	7

Chart (2024)	Peak position
Scottish Albums	34
UK Physical Albums (Official Charts Company)	18
UK Vinyl Albums	32
UK Independent Albums	9
