= Hey... Bo Diddley: In Concert =

Live album by Bo Diddley with Mainsqueeze
- Released: 1986
- Recorded: September 1984; European tour
- Genre: Rock
- Label: Conifer Records; Magnum Force Records; Aim Trading Group

Alternative cover
- Cover of the re-release

Hey... Bo Diddley: In Concert is a 1986 live album by Bo Diddley, recorded on a European tour. His backing band for the performances on the album were Mainsqueeze, featuring guitarist Eric Bell, previously of Thin Lizzy, and Dick Heckstall-Smith, the jazz and blues saxophonist. Other members of the band included bass guitarist Keith Tillman, who, like Heckstall-Smith, had previously played with John Mayall & the Bluesbreakers; and drummer Leonard "Stretch" Stretching, who had performed with Marvin Gaye and Tom Waits.

The album was re-released in the US in October 2001 on the Aim Trading Group label, and has also been released with different titles.

== Track listing ==
All tracks composed by Ellas McDaniel (Bo Diddley) except where stated.

1. "Intro / Bo Diddley Vamp"
2. "Doctor Jeckyll"
3. "Everleen"
4. "I Don't Know Where I've Been"
5. "You Can't Judge a Book" (Willie Dixon)
6. "Roadrunner"
7. "I'm a Man"
8. "Mona"

== Personnel ==
- Bo Diddley – vocals, guitar
- Eric Bell – guitar
- Dick Heckstall-Smith – alto saxophone
- Dave "Munch" Moore – keyboards
- Keith Tillman – bass guitar
- Leonard "Stretch" Stretching – drums
