= Jim Leverton =

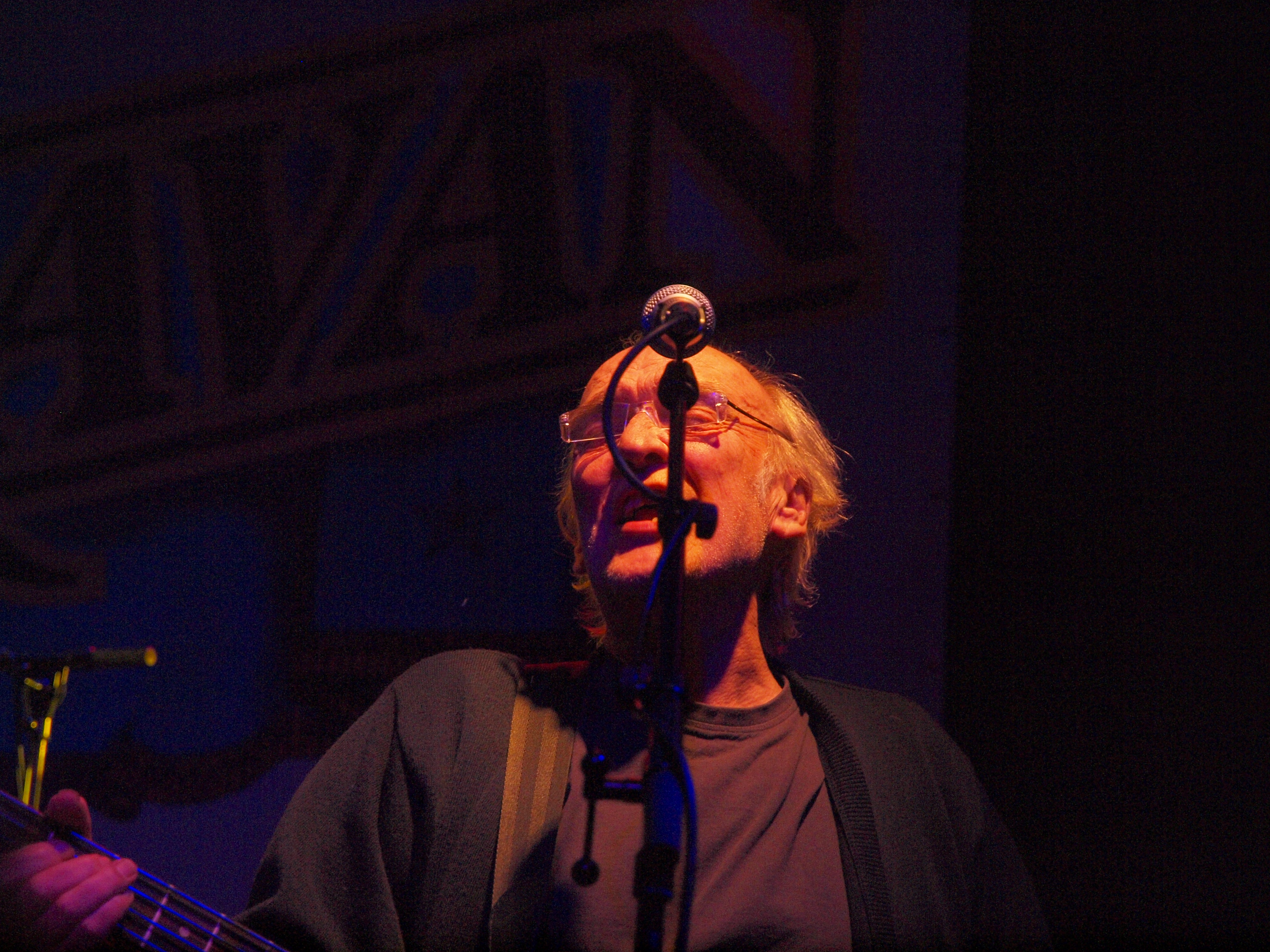
- Jim Leverton (2012)

Background information
- Born: 6 June 1946 (age 80); Dover, Kent, England
- Genres: Progressive rock; folk rock; blues rock; psychedelic rock
- Occupation: Musician
- Instruments: Bass; vocals; keyboards
- Years active: 1960s–present
- Formerly of: Caravan; Fat Mattress; Humble Pie; Rory Gallagher

Jim Leverton (born 6 June 1946, Dover, Kent, England) is an English professional musician, with a career spanning nearly fifty years, including as a sidesman to the Jimi Hendrix Experience's Noel Redding, Steve Marriott, Blodwyn Pig and the Canterbury scene band Caravan.

== Early years ==
After leaving school in Folkestone in 1964, Leverton spent a short while as an apprentice bricklayer but it was not long before he decided his future was as a musician. By the early 1960s he was already working in semi-professional beat groups in and around Dover, including The Big Beats (1962–63).

By 1964 he was ready to work full-time in music, and joined The Burnettes from Folkestone who had Leverton's friend Noel Redding on guitar. They broke up 18 months later having released two singles. Leverton soon joined another band with Noel Redding, The Loving Kind (1965–67) formerly The Lonely Ones. They released three singles for Pye Records including a cover of Marvin Gaye's "Ain't That Peculiar". Redding left the band to join the Jimi Hendrix Experience, but The Loving Kind continued for a while and Leverton worked as a session musician with Tom Jones, Gilbert O'Sullivan and Engelbert Humperdinck.

When Redding formed his new band Fat Mattress (1968–70) he was reunited with Leverton alongside Neil Landon (vocals) and Eric Dillon (drums). The band toured America and released two albums.

== Later career ==
Leverton joined Juicy Lucy (1971) but left after their tour of America to take a few months rest. He was soon back at work, this time with Ellis (1972) fronted by the former Love Affair singer, Steve Ellis, and including keyboard player Zoot Money. Next came two years with Hemlock (1972-3) led by Miller Anderson. Their album Hemlock was released on Deram Records in 1973 and the band toured the UK, Europe and America.

He moved on to work on a solo album for Henry McCullough leading to a lifelong friendship. He also gigged with singer Frankie Miller before joining Savoy Brown (1974) touring the States and releasing the album Boogie Brothers. In 1975 he spent some time with Leo Sayer's band before joining Joe Brown and the Bruvvers (1976–77) and linking up again with Zoot Money.

In 1978, Steve Marriott a long-time friend of Joe Brown went to one of their gigs. He needed a bass player/vocalist, heard Leverton and persuaded Leverton and Brown that they should join Steve Marriott and Blind Drunk (1978–79). That was the start of a long working relationship with Marriott until his death in 1991. Marriott and Leverton were together in a succession of Marriott led bands, including Steve Marriott and Packet of Three (1980-1991). The album Majik Mijits was recorded with Marriott and Ronnie Lane and was released in 2000. A number of live albums are also still available today.

Ine the 1990s, Leverton briefly joined the reformed Blodwyn Pig and subsequently played with Rory Gallagher from 1992. He then met Geoffrey Richardson. They started a long and successful gigging partnership, and they recorded their first album Follow Your Heart in 1996. Meanwhile, in 1995 Richardson, who had been with Caravan since the early 1970s, suggested Leverton as a replacement.

== Current ==
Leverton continues to play with Caravan and with The Blue Devils in Kent. He also plays bass with Rocky and the Natives alongside Andy Newmark (drums), Chris Godden (guitar), Malcolm Barnard (vocals) and Geoffrey Richardson (violin) and produced their debut album Let's Hear it for the Old Guys in 2013.

== Selected discography ==
- 1969: Fat Mattress, Fat Mattress
- 1970: Fat Mattress II, Fat Mattress
- 1971: Get a Whiff a This, Juicy Lucy
- 1972: Riding on the Crest of a Slump, Ellis
- 1973: Hemlock, Hemlock
- 1974: Boogie Brothers, Savoy Brown
- 1975: Mind Your Own Business, Henry McCullough
- 1993: Packet of Three: Live, Steve Marriott
- 1995: The Battle of Hastings, Caravan
- 1998: Dingwalls 6.7.84, Steve Marriott
- 2000: The Legendary Majik Mijits, Steve Marriott and Ronnie Lane
- 2003: Poor Man's Rich Man, Jim Leverton and Geoffrey Richardson
- 2003: Nowhere to Hide, Caravan
- 2005: Bright New Way, Jim Leverton
- 2006: End of the Pier Show, Jim Leverton and Geoffrey Richardson
- 2012: Lennon Bermuda, (Disc 2, Track 9) with Rocky and the Natives
- 2013: Let's Hear It For the Old Guys, Rocky and the Natives
