= The Black Sheep of the Family: The Anthology =

Compilation album by Fat Mattress
- Released: 15 August 2000
- Recorded: 1968–1970
- Genre: Folk rock; psychedelic rock; progressive rock; art rock
- Label: Castle
- Producer: Fat Mattress

Fat Mattress chronology
Fat Mattress II (1970)	The Black Sheep of the Family: The Anthology (2000)	Magic Forest: The Anthology (2006)

The Black Sheep of the Family: The Anthology is a compilation album by English rock band Fat Mattress, released on 15 August 2000 by Castle Communications. It includes both of their albums plus bonus tracks. The album is named after "Black Sheep of the Family", a song written by Steve Hammond, initially released as the B-side to "Highway" in 1970.

== Track listing ==
Disc one
No.	Title	Writer(s)	Length
1.	"All Night Drinker"	Neil Landon, Jimmy Leverton	3:18
2.	"I Don't Mind"	Landon, Noel Redding	3:51
3.	"Bright New Way"	Landon, Leverton	3:48
4.	"Petrol Pump Assistant"	Landon, Redding	3:01
5.	"Mr. Moonshine"	Landon, Redding	4:04
6.	"Magic Forest"	Landon, Leverton	3:05
7.	"She Came in the Morning"	Landon	3:47
8.	"Everything's Blue"	Redding	2:50
9.	"Walking Through the Garden"	Redding	4:20
10.	"How Can I Live"	Landon, Redding	4:26
11.	"Little Girl in White"	Redding	4:08
12.	"Margarita"	Leverton	4:14
13.	"Which Way to Go"	Leverton	3:03
14.	"Future Days"	Leverton	4:02
15.	"Cold Wall of Stone"	Jacobs, Landon, Leverton	2:36
16.	"Eric the Red"	Landon, Leverton, Redding	2:57
17.	"Iridescent Butterfly"	Landon	3:42

- Tracks 1 to 10 are Fat Mattress album (1969)

Disc two
No.	Title	Writer(s)	Length
1.	"The Storm"	Landon, Leverton	4:13
2.	"Anyway You Want"	Landon, Leverton	3:47
3.	"Leafy Lane"	Landon, Leverton	2:50
4.	"Naturally"	Landon, Leverton	3:03
5.	"Roamin'"	Landon, Leverton	4:25
6.	"Happy My Love"	Landon, Leverton	3:43
7.	"Childhood Dream"	Landon, Leverton	3:20
8.	"She"	Landon	2:36
9.	"Highway"	Landon, Redding	4:24
10.	"At the Ball"	Landon, Redding	4:13
11.	"People"	Landon, Redding	4:00
12.	"Hall of Kings"	Landon	5:34
13.	"Long Red"	Lansberg, Felix Pappalardi, Ventura, Leslie West	4:25
14.	"Words"	Landon, Leverton	4:15
15.	"The River"	Landon, Leverton	17:12
16.	"Black Sheep of the Family"	Steve Hammond	4:29

- Tracks 1 to 11 are Fat Mattress II album (1970)
