= The Rocker (song) =

- Cover of the German single release L–R: Bell, Downey, Lynott

Single by Thin Lizzy

from the album Vagabonds of the Western World
- B-side: "Here I Go Again" or "A Ride in the Lizzy Mobile"
- Released: 9 November 1973 (UK)
- Recorded: 24 May 1973 (recording); 17–19 July 1973 (mixing)
- Studio: AIR Studios and Decca 4, London
- Genre: Hard rock
- Length: 2:45; 5:12 (album version)
- Label: Decca
- Songwriters: Phil Lynott, Brian Downey, Eric Bell
- Producers: Nick Tauber and Phil Lynott

Thin Lizzy singles chronology
| "Randolph's Tango" (1973) | "The Rocker" (1973) | "Little Darling" (1974) |

Music video
- TOPPOP: Thin Lizzy - "The Rocker" on YouTube

"The Rocker" is a song by Irish rock group Thin Lizzy, included on their 1973 album Vagabonds of the Western World. It was also released as a single in a 2:41 edited format; the original album track stretched to 5:17, with most of the extra length being taken up by an extended guitar solo by Eric Bell. There is an accompanying performance on Dutch TV programme TopPop to the song which features Gary Moore recorded in 1974 during his first of two spells with the band.

The B-side of the single in most territories was the album track "Here I Go Again", but in Germany the non-album track, "A Ride in the Lizzy Mobile", was used. This track later appeared on the four-CD box set Vagabonds Kings Warriors Angels as "Cruising in the Lizzy Mobile".

The single failed to chart in the UK, but reached No. 11 in Ireland and spent four weeks on the chart. However, it became a live favourite and was one of the few songs from Eric Bell's time with the band to survive his departure and become part of the live repertoire of the Brian Robertson/Scott Gorham lineup (who performed the song in a lower key than the original). It was the final track on the band's 1978 live album Live and Dangerous.

The lead guitar solo features a prominent phase effect.

== Charts ==
| Chart (1973) | Peak position |
|---|---|
| Ireland (IRMA) | 14 |

== Personnel ==
- Phil Lynott – bass guitar, lead vocals
- Eric Bell – lead and rhythm guitar
- Brian Downey – drums

== Artwork ==
In 2025 artist Jim Fitzpatrick, who worked with the band on many of their album covers, said on The Ireland Podcast that the black and white artwork for the UK cover of "The Rocker" was "one of the best images I did." Fitzpatrick explained that the image was reused later, with colour, for the band's "Remembering – Part 1".

== Cover versions ==
Raven covered the song for their 1994 album Glow.

British heavy metal band Saxon covered the song on their 2021 album of covers, Inspirations.

== In popular culture ==
The song was remixed for the PlayStation 3 video game Gran Turismo 5: Prologue.

The song is featured in the soundtrack of the 2013 film Rush.
