= Thin Lizzy (album) =

Studio album by Thin Lizzy
- Released: 30 April 1971
- Recorded: 4–9 January 1971
- Studios: Decca Studios, London
- Genres: Folk rock; blues rock
- Length: 38:39
- Labels: Decca; London (Canada and US)
- Producers: Scott English, Nick Tauber

Thin Lizzy chronology
Thin Lizzy (1971)	Shades of a Blue Orphanage (1972)

US London Records edition cover

Singles from Thin Lizzy
- 1. "The Farmer" / "I Need You" Released: 31 July 1970 (IRL)

Thin Lizzy is the debut studio album by Irish rock band Thin Lizzy, released on 30 April 1971. The album was released in the United States on 14 July 1971.

Following the release of the album, the band recorded the EP New Day, produced and recorded by Nick Tauber at Decca Studios on 14–17 June 1971 and released on 20 August 1971. The songs from the EP were included in later editions of the album.

== Background and recording ==
In the autumn of 1970, Brian Tuite and Peter Bardon took over the management of Thin Lizzy. Lynott told Tuite: "we've got twelve songs at the moment that we'd be happy enough to record". After listening to some of the songs Tuite tried to find a record deal for the band. Since he had a good friendship with Decca Records's A&R man, Frank Rodgers, tried to arrange a gig for Thin Lizzy and another of his acts, soul singer Ditch Cassidy. Cassidy lacked his regular band, and so Tuite put Thin Lizzy as his backing band.

After watching Thin Lizzy's performance at the Zhivago Club on 12 November 1970, Frank Rodgers showed his interest in them rather than Cassidy, and offered them a record deal with Decca; however, Rodgers also suggested another showcase gig for other Decca personnel before signing a contract. This time the band performed their original material. "Look What The Wind Blew In" was one of the songs that caught Rodgers's attention. Afterward Tuite travelled to London to meet Decca's head of A & R, Dick Rowe. The paperwork was drawn up on 12 November 1970, and on the first day of December, Decca officially signed “Tin Lissy" to a one-year recording contract, with the option of extending the deal by two further periods of one year in September 1971 and September 1972. All going well, they were committed to delivering three albums to the company. The advance was £500, with a further £500 to be paid after the album had been completed.

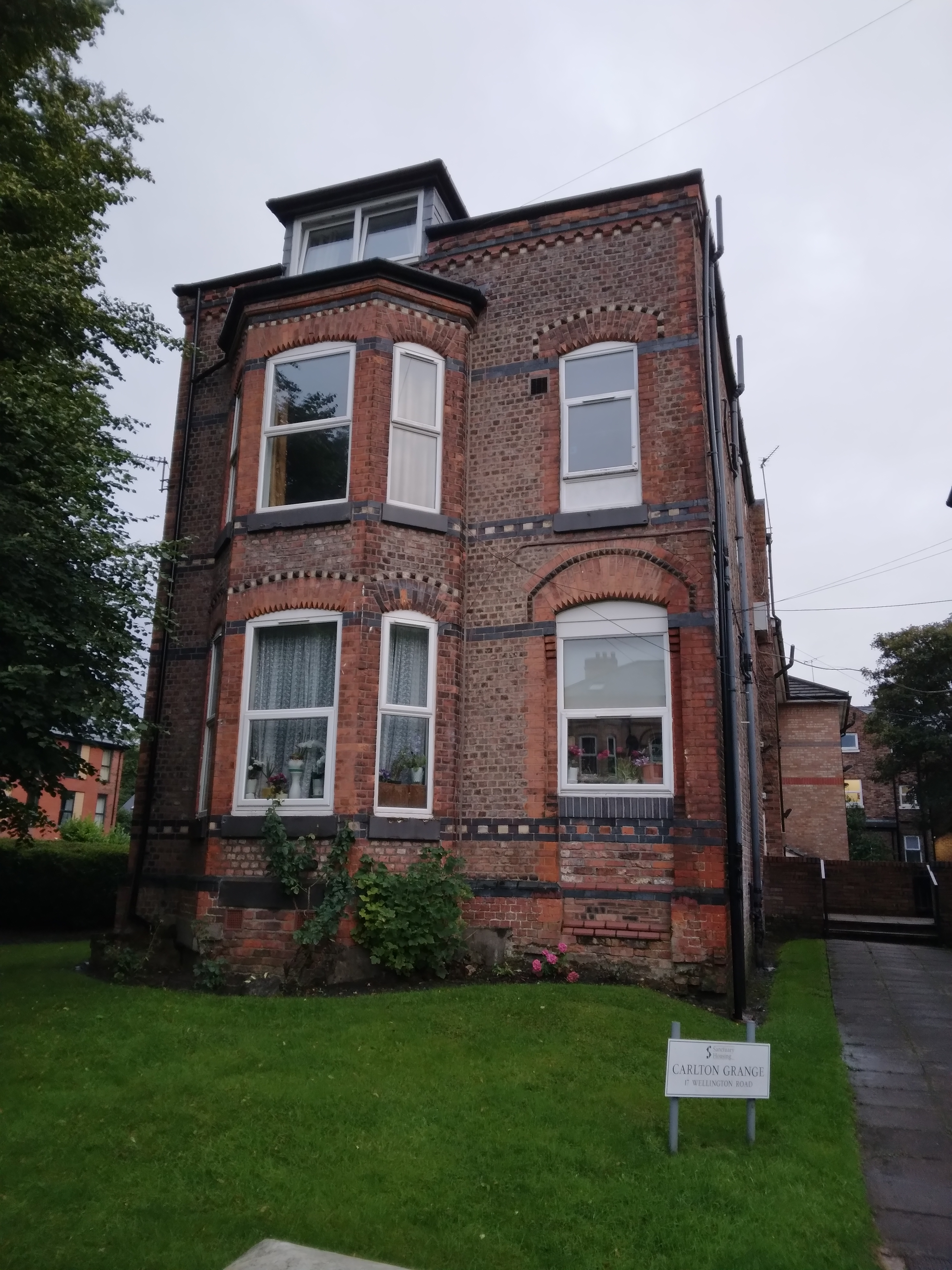
Former site of the Clifton Grange Hotel, Whalley Range, Manchester which was owned by Lynott's mother Philomena from 1966 to 1980 and inspired numerous songs, including the eponymous Clifton Grange Hotel

Thin Lizzy left Ireland after an afternoon gig on 3 January 1971 at the Afton Club in Dundalk, to start recording their first album in London's Decca Studios. On their way to London, Lynott met John Peel and introduced Thin Lizzy to him; within ten months Peel would be booking the group for a session on his Radio 1 show, on 12 October 1971. The band booked a guesthouse in Sussex Gardens in which to stay during the first album recording. The work began on the Monday morning and was done on Friday evening. Brian Downey says: "We got up at nine in the morning, [went] into the studio, played from about ten or half ten to eight or nine, then clocked off and went back to the guesthouse. Then we did it again, for the whole week". According to manager Brian Tuite, while working with producer Scott English, Lynott had a fight with him about the bass sound: "Philip fell out a bit with him because Scott wanted to turn down the bass. It got to the stage where I was up in the control room and Scott would say, 'Go down and tell the bass player to turn down.' He wouldn’t use the [talkback] mike because Phil wouldn't do it anyway. So I'd say to Philip, 'The Bearded One wants you to turn down the bass,' and he'd say, 'Tell that fucking Yank to piss off.' He knew full well the mike would be open."

Eric Bell explained that the band was stoned during the whole process of recording and that he doesn't remember anything from the sessions but he remembers Scott English's accompaniment with band of giving them bags of weed: "We were permanently stoned. Scott English was this jovial American guy, a nice big bloke. He had this enormous bag of grass in one of the drawers in the studio. He brought it out, threw it on the table and said, 'Help yourselves, boys!' That was it. I can’t actually remember recording the first album. I didn’t know anything until the end of the record, it was just a haze. Smoking a bit of dope and playing music went hand-in-hand for us. We were just that type of band at that point in time. It seemed to work for us, we got ideas. There was a lot of things on that album that were completely ad-libbed."

== Reception ==
Professional ratings
Review scores
Source	Rating
AllMusic	3/5 stars
Collector's Guide to Heavy Metal	8/10

Eduardo Rivadavia, in a retrospective review for AllMusic, described the album as "surprisingly mellow" and wrote that a number of songs sound "confused and unfinished". However, he did describe "Look What the Wind Blew In" as a "hint of things to come", and that the bonus track "Dublin" from the "New Day" EP contained "Lynott's first great lyric". Canadian journalist Martin Popoff appreciated the experimental flavour of the album "drawing mainly from bluesy non-metal influences" and found the compositions "astonishingly well written, very Irish, very heart-felt".

== Artwork ==
According to Decca's record sleeve co-ordinator, John Slater, Phil Lynott came to his office to discuss ideas for the album cover and to explain his ideas: "His first notion was for a burning hand coming out of a freshly dug grave! He wasn't interested in doing it with a cartoon twist, it had to be real life." They decided upon an American automobile theme, but failed to find the right car, so eventually chose a fish-eye photograph of the headlight of "a Vauxhall Victor or something like that." Lack of communication between Decca and Thin Lizzy resulted in the album cover initially having the wrong spelling of the band's name, showing 'Tin Lizzy'.

Philip Tapsfield of the Decca Art Department recalls: "One of our in-house artists, David Ansty, designed their sleeve. He actually did the sleeve with the name 'Tin Lizzy' instead of 'Thin Lizzy'." Decca tried to convince the band to change their name instead of designing the cover again, but the band's refusal resulted in the postponement of the album release for a week, while the artwork was being corrected. The band's manager Ted Carroll has also stated that another designer, Walt McGuire from Decca American, designed different artwork for the US release, which is now a collector's item. The US album cover shows a mini cartoon model of a Ford Model T car (aka Tin Lizzie) driving over a naked female hip, while the back sleeve features various band photos including a fish-eye shot taken in Dublin in autumn 1970, by photographer Roy Esmonde, along with some shots taken in the studio.

== Influence ==
The song "Honesty Is No Excuse" was covered by Cass McCombs on his 2013 album Big Wheel and Others.

== Track listings ==
All tracks are written by Phil Lynott, except where noted.

Side one
No.	Title	Writer(s)	Length
1.	"The Friendly Ranger at Clontarf Castle"	Eric Bell, Lynott	3:01
2.	"Honesty Is No Excuse"		3:40
3.	"Diddy Levine"		7:04
4.	"Ray-Gun"	Bell	3:05
5.	"Look What the Wind Blew In"		3:23

Side two
No.	Title	Writer(s)	Length
6.	"Eire"		2:07
7.	"Return of the Farmer's Son"	Brian Downey, Lynott	4:14
8.	"Clifton Grange Hotel"		2:26
9.	"Saga of the Ageing Orphan"		3:40
10.	"Remembering"		5:59

New Day EP bonus tracks
No.	Title	Writer(s)	Length
11.	"Dublin"		2:26
12.	"Remembering, Pt. 2 (New Day)"	Bell, Downey, Lynott	5:04
13.	"Old Moon Madness"		3:52
14.	"Things Ain't Workin' Out Down at the Farm"		4:29
Total length:			54:30

=== Remastered and expanded release ===
On 11 October 2010, a new remastered and expanded version of Thin Lizzy was released. This version features the following bonus tracks:

No.	Title	Length
11.	"The Farmer"	3:40
12.	"Dublin"	2:30
13.	"Remembering Pt. 2 (New Day)"	5:08
14.	"Old Moon Madness"	3:56
15.	"Things Ain't Working Out Down at the Farm"	4:32
16.	"Look What the Wind Blew In" (1977 overdubbed and remixed version)	3:22
17.	"Honesty Is No Excuse" (1977 overdubbed and remixed version)	2:46
18.	"Dublin" (1977 overdubbed and remixed version)	2:32
19.	"Things Ain't Working Out Down at the Farm" (1977 overdubbed and remixed version)	3:58
Total length:		71:03

== Personnel ==
Thin Lizzy

- Philip Lynott – vocals, bass guitar, acoustic guitar
- Eric Bell – lead and rhythm guitar, twelve-string guitar
- Brian Downey – drums, percussion

Additional musicians

- Ivor Raymonde – mellotron on "Honesty Is No Excuse"
- Eric Wrixon – keyboards on "The Farmer"
- Gary Moore – additional guitars, keyboards on tracks 16–19
- Midge Ure – additional vocals, guitars on tracks 16–19

Production

- Scott English – producer
- Nick Tauber – producer
- Peter Rynston – engineer
- Roy Esmonde – photography
- David Antsy – cover design
- Walt Mcguire – cover design

== Charts ==
Chart performance for Thin Lizzy
Chart (2026)	Peak position
Danish Vinyl Albums (Hitlisten)	39
German Albums (Offizielle Top 100)	41
German Rock & Metal Albums (Offizielle Top 100)	14
Greek Albums (IFPI)	78
Norwegian Physical Albums (IFPI Norge) 55th Anniversary deluxe edition	9
Scottish Albums (Official Charts)	9
Swedish Hard Rock Albums (Sverigetopplistan)	18
Swedish Physical Albums (Sverigetopplistan)	9
UK Albums Sales (Official Charts)	10
