= Clonakilty Cowboys =

Studio album by The Noel Redding Band
- Released: 1975
- Recorded: 1975
- Genre: Blues rock, Pub Rock
- Label: RCA
- Producer: Muff Winwood

The Noel Redding Band chronology
Clonakilty Cowboys (1975)	Blowin' (1976)

Clonakilty Cowboys is the first album by the English-Irish folk rock band The Noel Redding Band. Released in 1975, the album is named after Clonakilty, from where the band was formed.

== Reception ==
Professional ratings
Review scores
Source	Rating
allmusic	3/5 stars

In a review for the music website allmusic, critic William Ruhlmann described the album as "very much a British rock album of its time", going on to say that it "didn't make any noise on the charts and it didn't deserve to".

== Track listing ==
No.	Title	Writer(s)	Length
1.	"There's a Light"	David Clarke, Noel Redding, Pete Kircher	2:59
2.	"Throw Me a Buoy"	Clarke, Redding	2:52
3.	"After All"	Clarke	4:36
4.	"Roller Coaster Kids"	Clarke	3:18
5.	"Eight Nights a Week"	Clarke, Redding	3:37
6.	"Clonakilty Cowboys"	Clarke	2:55
7.	"Snowstorm"	Clarke, Redding	3:01
8.	"Born to His Name"	Clarke, Redding	2:50
9.	"If I Had"	Clarke, Redding	3:40
10.	"Got to Move Away"	Redding, Carol Rosen	3:44

== Personnel ==
The Noel Redding Band

- Noel Redding – bass guitar, vocals, guitar arrangements
- David Clarke – vocals, keyboards, piano, organ, clavinet
- Eric Bell – guitar, vocals
- Les Sampson – drums, percussion

Additional personnel

- Robbie Walsh – guitar
- Muff Winwood – production
