= Shades of a Blue Orphanage =

Studio album by Thin Lizzy
- Released: 10 March 1972
- Recorded: 17 December 1971 – January 1972
- Studios: De Lane Lea Studios, Wembley, London
- Genres: Folk rock; hard rock
- Length: 40:09
- Label: Decca
- Producer: Nick Tauber

Thin Lizzy chronology
Thin Lizzy (1971)	Shades of a Blue Orphanage (1972)	Vagabonds of the Western World (1973)

Shades of a Blue Orphanage is the second studio album by Irish rock band Thin Lizzy, released in 1972. The title is a combination of the members' previous bands: Shades of Blue and Orphanage.

"Sarah" was written for Phil Lynott's grandmother who raised him when his mother, Philomena, was unable to do so. This song should not be confused with the 1979 song of the same name, for Lynott's daughter, included on Black Rose: A Rock Legend.

A remastered and expanded version of Shades of a Blue Orphanage was released on 11 October 2010.

== Reception ==
Professional ratings
Review scores
Source	Rating
AllMusic	3/5 stars
Collector's Guide to Heavy Metal	7/10
Pitchfork	6.3/10

Stuart Berman of Pitchfork stated that Thin Lizzy "weren’t lacking ambition at this stage, but rather direction", criticizing songs such as the album opener for its "early, clumsy stab at heaviosity from a band that, at this point, had a much better grasp of intimacy", but praising "Lynott’s lyrical voice" as a "sturdy anchor" to the band's output. Martin Popoff defined Shades of a Blue Orphanage an "honest work", showing hints of Lynott's folk acoustic past, "some '60s-directed progressive psychedelia and even out of context rockabilly" typical of such early 1970s rock records. Eduardo Rivadavia of AllMusic was largely critical of the album, describing it as "disappointing", and both the opening track and the title track as "overblown and disjointed". However, he picked out "Baby Face" and "Buffalo Gal" as bright moments, and praised Lynott's "eloquent and personal" performance on "Sarah".

== Track listings ==
All tracks are written by Phil Lynott, except where noted.

Side one
No.	Title	Writer(s)	Length
1.	"The Rise and Dear Demise of the Funky Nomadic Tribes"	Lynott, Eric Bell, Brian Downey	7:06
2.	"Buffalo Gal"		5:30
3.	"I Don't Want to Forget How to Jive"		1:46
4.	"Sarah"		2:59
5.	"Brought Down"		4:19

Side two
No.	Title	Length
6.	"Baby Face"	3:27
7.	"Chatting Today"	4:19
8.	"Call the Police"	3:37
9.	"Shades of a Blue Orphanage"	7:06

Remastered CD edition bonus tracks
No.	Title	Writer(s)	Length
10.	"Whiskey in the Jar" (full-length version)	Traditional; arranged by Lynott, Bell, Downey	5:45
11.	"Black Boys on the Corner" (B-Side of the single "Whiskey in the Jar")		3:24
12.	"Buffalo Gal" (1977 overdubbed and remixed version)		5:10
13.	"Sarah" (1977 overdubbed and remixed version)		2:47
14.	"Brought Down" (1977 overdubbed and remixed version)		3:06
15.	"Suicide" (BBC Radio 1 John Peel Session)		4:03
16.	"Black Boys on the Corner" (BBC Radio 1 John Peel Session)		3:07
17.	"Saga of the Ageing Orphan" (BBC Radio 1 John Peel Session)		3:39
18.	"Whiskey in the Jar" (BBC Radio 1 John Peel Session)		5:55
Total length:			77:05

== Singles ==
- Whiskey in the Jar / Black Boys on the Corner – 7" (1972)

== Personnel ==
Thin Lizzy

- Philip Lynott – vocals, bass, rhythm guitar, acoustic guitar
- Eric Bell – lead guitar, acoustic guitar
- Brian Downey – drums, percussion

Additional musicians

- Clodagh Simonds – harpsichord, keyboards, mellotron
- Gary Moore – additional guitar on tracks 12–14

Production

- Nick Tauber – producer
- Louie Austin – engineer
- Dick Plant, Tony Duggan, Desmond Najekodunmi – assistant engineer
