= Neil Landon =

English musical artist (1941–2020)

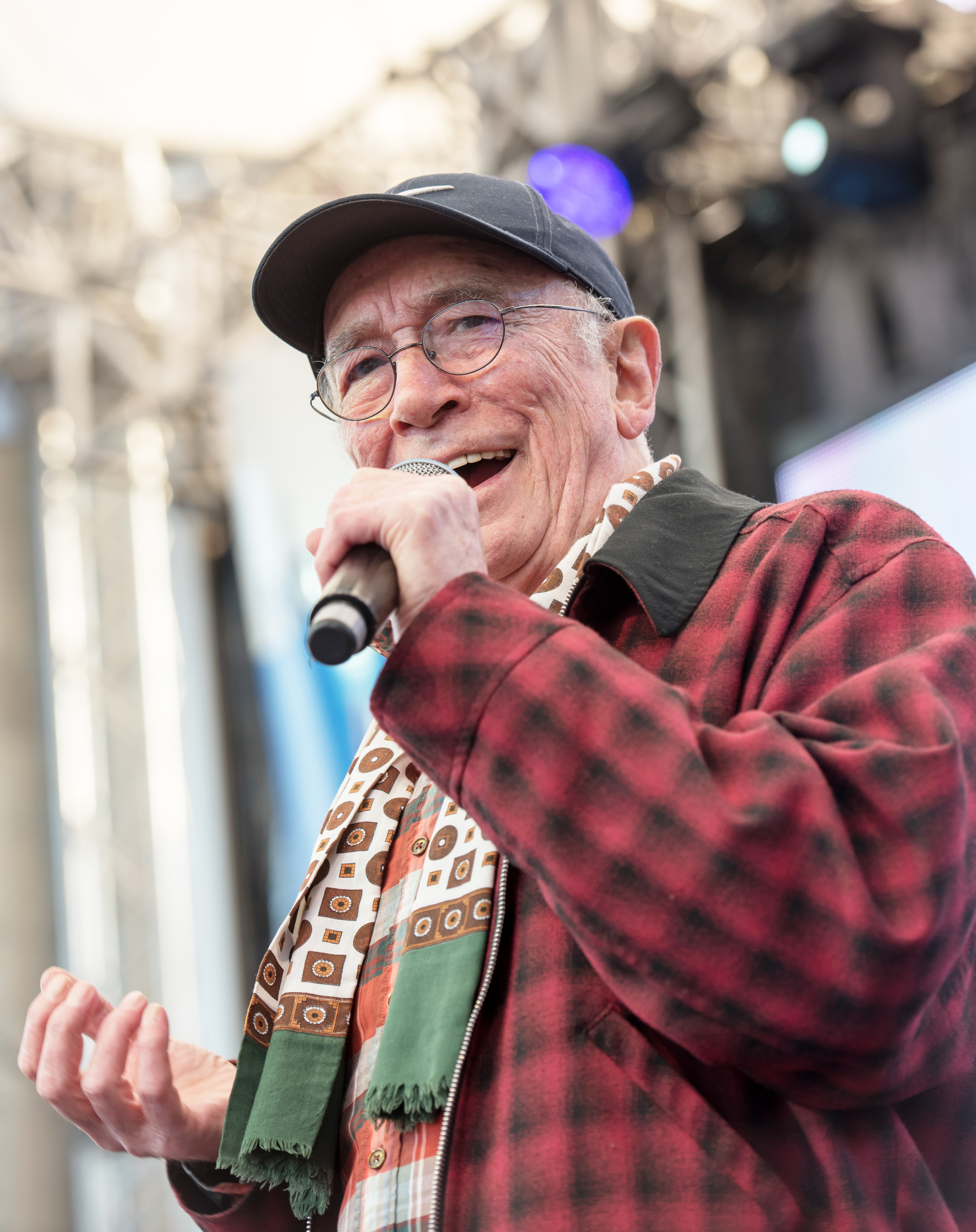

Background information
- Born: Patrick Cahill; 26 July 1941; Kirdford, Sussex, England
- Died: 26 March 2020 (aged 78) Hamburg, Germany
- Genres: Pop; rock; psychedelic rock; rock and roll
- Occupations: Singer, songwriter, musician
- Instruments: Vocals, guitar, percussion
- Years active: 1960–2020
- Formerly of: The Ivy League; The Flower Pot Men; White Plains; Fat Mattress

Neil Landon (born Patrick Cahill, 26 July 1941 – 26 March 2020) was an English singer, who has been credited with singing on a number of hits in the UK singles chart. In addition, he was a singer and songwriter with the band Fat Mattress, which he co-founded with guitarist/singer Noel Redding.

== Biography ==
=== Early life ===
Born in Petworth, Sussex, England, and later based in Folkestone, England, Landon started singing and playing semi-professionally under his real name of Pat Cahill in 1960, replacing Kitson 'Kit' Keen in the Dover based 'Rolling Stones' (no connection with the later famous band of that name).

=== Early career ===
When he left to front the 'Cheetahs' (1961–62), he was replaced by Mick Morris (later of Mirkwood). After adopting the name Neil Landon, he joined Folkestone group the 'Burnettes' (1962–65), in which Noel Redding became lead guitarist and Pete Kircher, the drummer. In 1965 Landon released two singles, "Waiting Here For Someone" b/w "I've Got Nothing To Lose" (Decca F 12330) and "I'm Your Puppet" b/w "I Still Love You" (Decca F 12451). Both were written and produced by John Carter and Ken Lewis. Despite television appearances however, early success eluded him.

=== The Ivy League and The Flower Pot Men ===
After replacing Ken Lewis in The Ivy League (Tony Burrows had replaced John Carter in 1966) Landon sang on a few of the group's less successful records. Subsequently, both Landon and Burrows became members of The Flower Pot Men, who scored a hit in 1967 with "Let's Go To San Francisco" (Deram DM142) which reached Number 4 in the UK singles chart.

=== Fat Mattress ===
In 1968, Landon began writing songs with former bandmate Redding, initially as a solo project but with the aim of involving other former bandmates as session musicians. Bassist Jim Leverton had connections with two of Landon's former bands having both played in the Burnettes as well as alongside the Rolling Stones. Since the demise of the Burnettes, Leverton had worked in the recording studio with the Walker Brothers and Cat Stevens among others, and had recently been playing as a member of Engelbert Humperdinck's backing band, where he had met the drummer Eric Dillon. With Leverton and Dillon now on board it was decided to turn the recording project into a new group and Fat Mattress was born.

The new band toured the United States as support for the Jimi Hendrix Experience, securing a recording contract on their return to the UK and playing the Isle of Wight Festival 1969. Fat Mattress recorded two albums and a third was underway when they disbanded at the end of 1970. The band's first album yielded the major Dutch hit "Magic Forest", which Landon co-wrote and performed lead vocal on.

=== Later career ===
After a spell in the U.S., Landon returned in 1972 to live in the UK where he put together a new band, 'Mainhorse Airline'. The group was short-lived however, and in 1974 Landon relocated to Hamburg, Germany where as 'Neil Landon and Friends', he quickly established a following. In September 1975 Landon's first German recording, a solo album produced by ex-Rattle Achim Reichel, was released. Two more albums, this time credited to the 'Neil Landon Band', followed as well as two more solo albums. He was also a featured member of German Rock'n'Roll Revival band "Rudolf Rock & die Schocker" using the stage name "Glitzer Glatze". They were quite well known in Germany, supporting among others Jerry Lee Lewis on his 1978 German tour. He sang on several LPs and 45s with this group. Throughout the 1980s and 1990s Landon continued to be involved in a wide range of musical projects, including a 1982, Klaus Voormann produced single, "One of the Big Boys"; stage appearances as lead singer with Klaus Gerlach's rock horror troupe; with the 'Neil Landon Five'; with Noel Redding at Hamburg's 'Fabrik' club in 1997; and in starring roles in the musicals, Let's Twist and Jailhouse in 1998 and 1999.

In the spring of 2001 Landon's solo show, 'Musical Highlights', was a success with audiences, and in the summer of that year he appeared with his own new 'Neil Landon Band'.

=== Death ===
Neil Landon died in Hamburg in 2020 after a short battle with cancer. He is survived by his wife Baerbel and his sons Patrick junior and Toby Mortimer.

== Discography ==
=== With The Ivy League ===
==== Albums ====
- Sounds of the Ivy League (1967)
- Tomorrow Is Another Day (1969)

==== Singles ====
Year	Single
1967	"Four and Twenty Hours"
1967	"Suddenly Things"
1967	"Thank You for Loving Me"

=== The Flower Pot Men ===
==== Singles ====
- "Let's Go To San Francisco" (Deram DM142) (1967) – UK Number 4

=== Fat Mattress ===
==== Albums ====
- Fat Mattress (1969)
- Fat Mattress II (1970)

==== Compilation albums ====
- The Black Sheep of the Family: The Anthology (2000)
- Magic Forest: The Anthology (2006)

==== Singles ====
- from Fat Mattress:
  - "Magic Forest"/"Petrol Pump Assistant" (1969)
- from Fat Mattress II:
  - "Naturally"/"Iridescent Butterfly" (1969)
  - "Highway"/"Black Sheep of the Family" (1970)
- Non-album singles:
  - "Magic Lanterns"/"Bright New Way" (1970)

=== Neil Landon ===
==== Albums ====
- Neil Landon (1975) – Neil Landon (Nova / Teldec 6.22353 AS)
- Rendezvous (1977) – Neil Landon Band (Nova / Teldec 6.23011 AS)
- Sold Out (live album) (1978) – Neil Landon Band (Nova / Teldec 6.23477 AO)
- Leben wie ein Maulwurf (1984) – Neil Landon (Mercury 818 574 – Q)
- The Best Of (compilation album) (1998) – Neil Landon (Yes/No YNCD 19982)
- Sings Musical Highlights (2000) – Neil Landon (Neues Theater Special Edition)
