= Vagabonds of the Western World =

- Cover art by Jim Fitzpatrick

Studio album by Thin Lizzy
- Released: 21 September 1973
- Recorded: 11 April – 19 July 1973
- Studios: AIR Studios and Decca 4, London
- Genres: Hard rock; blues rock
- Length: 39:59
- Label: Decca
- Producers: Nick Tauber, Phil Lynott

Thin Lizzy chronology
Shades of a Blue Orphanage (1972)	Vagabonds of the Western World (1973)	Nightlife (1974)

Vagabonds of the Western World is the third studio album by Irish hard rock band Thin Lizzy, released in 1973. It was the band's last album with original guitarist Eric Bell, as well as a trio, and the first to feature the artwork of Jim Fitzpatrick, whose work would appear on many subsequent albums by the band.

== Reception ==
Professional ratings
Review scores
Source	Rating
AllMusic	3.5/5 stars
Collector's Guide to Heavy Metal	7/10
Pitchfork	7.0/10
Uncut	3/5 stars

Pitchfork reviewer Stuart Berman remarked how the band were "starting to kick out the jams with greater confidence and consistency" on this album, with Phil Lynott producing "the sound of a spiritually adrift musician ecstatically discovering his true calling" on "The Rocker". Berman also commented favourably on the "swinging" "Mama Nature Said", the "gorgeous soul serenade 'Little Girl in Bloom'" and the title song. Eduardo Rivadavia of AllMusic described the album as Thin Lizzy's "first sonically satisfying album", with Lynott "brimming with attitude and dangerous swagger" on "The Rocker", their "first bona fide classic". He described "Little Girl in Bloom" as "absolutely flawless", and noted Eric Bell's slide guitar playing on the environmentalist "Mama Nature Said", but criticised "The Hero and the Madman" and "Slow Blues" as "overblown" and "tepid" respectively. Canadian journalist Martin Popoff remarked on the album's "crusty sound quality and style-searching waywardness", mixing influences ranging from American blues, to Motown, to early metal. He rated Vagabonds of the Western World the lowest of all Thin Lizzy's albums for four tracks which "seem either simple and out-of-character or dated", "bearing scant few traces of the high class Lizzy imprint."

== Track listings ==
Side one
No.	Title	Writer(s)	Length
1.	"Mama Nature Said"	Phil Lynott	4:52
2.	"The Hero and the Madman"	Lynott	6:08
3.	"Slow Blues"	Brian Downey, Lynott	5:14
4.	"The Rocker"	Eric Bell, Downey, Lynott	5:12

Side two
No.	Title	Writer(s)	Length
5.	"Vagabond of the Western World"	Lynott	4:44
6.	"Little Girl in Bloom"	Lynott	5:12
7.	"Gonna Creep Up on You"	Bell, Lynott	3:27
8.	"A Song for While I'm Away"	Lynott	5:10

When the album was repackaged for CD in 1991, it included the respective A and B-sides of the two singles released at around the same time. "Whiskey in the Jar" was Lizzy's first hit.

1991 CD edition bonus tracks
No.	Title	Writer(s)	Length
9.	"Whiskey in the Jar"	Traditional; arranged by Bell, Downey, Lynott	5:44
10.	"Black Boys on the Corner"	Lynott	3:21
11.	"Randolph's Tango"	Lynott	3:49
12.	"Broken Dreams"	Bell, Downey, Lynott	4:26
Total length:			57:19

=== Remastered and expanded release ===
On 11 October 2010 Vagabonds of the Western World was reissued as a 2CD deluxe edition. This version was remastered with bonus tracks. The original album and bonus material is featured on disc one, while disc two features bonus material.

Disc one bonus tracks
No.	Title	Writer(s)	Length
9.	"Randolph's Tango"		3:49
10.	"Broken Dreams"		4:26
11.	"The Rocker" (single version)		2:41
12.	"Here I Go Again" (B-side of the single "The Rocker")	Lynott	4:41
13.	"Cruising in the Lizzymobile" (originally "A Ride in the Lizzy Mobile", B-side of the German single "The Rocker")	Bell	4:07
14.	"Little Darling"	Lynott	2:55
15.	"Sitamoia"	Downey	3:20
16.	"Slow Blues" (1977 overdubbed and remixed version)		5:01
17.	"Randolph's Tango" (radio promo edit)		2:25
18.	"Whiskey in the Jar" (radio promo edit)		3:43
Total length:			77:07

Disc two
No.	Title	Writer(s)	Length
1.	"The Rocker" (BBC Radio One in Concert)		5:53
2.	"Things Ain't Working Out Down at the Farm" (BBC Radio One in Concert)	Lynott	7:32
3.	"Slow Blues" (BBC Radio One in Concert)		7:29
4.	"Gonna Creep Up on You" (BBC Radio One in Concert)		3:27
5.	"Suicide" (BBC Radio One in Concert)	Lynott	4:28
6.	"Vagabond of the Western World" (BBC Radio One John Peel Session)		4:27
7.	"Gonna Creep Up on You" (BBC Radio One John Peel Session)		3:22
8.	"Little Girl in Bloom" (BBC Radio One Rock On Session)		4:41
9.	"Sitamoia" (BBC Radio One Bob Harris Session)		3:45
10.	"Little Darling" (BBC Radio One Bob Harris Session)		3:05
11.	"Slow Blues" (BBC Radio One Bob Harris Session)		5:31
12.	"Showdown" (BBC Radio One Bob Harris Session)	Lynott	4:40
13.	"Black Boys on the Corner" (BBC Radio One John Peel Session)		4:12
Total length:			60:32

== Singles ==
- "Whisky in the Jar" / "Black Boys on the Corner" – 3 November 1972 (Irish Singles Chart No. 1, UK Singles Chart No. 6)
- "Randolph's Tango" / "Broken Dreams" – 4 May 1973 (Irish Singles Chart No. 14)
- "The Rocker" / "Here I Go Again" – 9 November 1973 (Irish Singles Chart No. 11)

In Germany, the B-side was "A Ride in the Lizzy Mobile".

- "Little Darling" / "Buffalo Gal" – 11 April 1974

In the USA, the B-side was "The Rocker".

== Personnel ==
Thin Lizzy

- Philip Lynott – vocals, bass guitar, associate producer
- Eric Bell – guitars, vocals
- Brian Downey – drums, percussion

Additional musicians

- Kid Jensen – voice on "The Hero and the Madman"
- Jan Schelhaas – organ on "Mama Nature Said" and "The Hero and the Madman"
- Fiachra Trench – string arrangement on "A Song for While I'm Away" and "Little Darling"
- Gary Moore – lead and acoustic guitar on "Sitamoia", "Little Darling" and "Slow Blues (1977 Version)" on disc 1 & tracks 8–13 on disc 2
- Strings: Tony Harris – viola; Ian MacKinnon – violin; Don McVay – viola; Alan Merrick – violin; Paul Mosby – cor anglais, oboe; Peter Oxar – violin; Peter Poole – violin; Godfrey Salmon – violin; Alan Sloan – violin; Quentin Williams – cello

Production

- Nick Tauber – producer
- Derek Varnals, Alan Harris, John Fuller – engineers
- Alan Leaming, Dave Baker, Pete Swetenham – assistant engineers
- Jim Fitzpatrick – artwork, design
- Rodney Matthews – design
- Mick Rock, John Thomson – photography

== Charts ==
Chart (2023)	Peak position
Scottish Albums (Official Charts)	99
