= Dave Clarke (musician) =

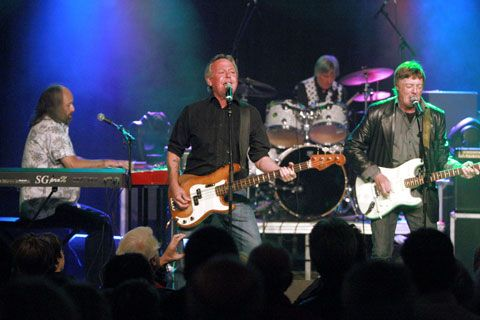
- Clarke (right) performing with Kast off Kinks in 2009

Background information
- Also known as: Big Dave
- Born: David Patrick Clarke; January 28, 1948 (age 78); Los Angeles, California, United States
- Origin: London, England
- Genres: Rock
- Occupation: Musician
- Instruments: Keyboards, guitars, vocals
- Years active: 1972–present

David Patrick Clarke (born January 28, 1948) is an American singer, guitarist and keyboard player. He was a member of The Noel Redding Band in the 1970s. In 1994, he became a member of The Kast Off Kinks, and has been ever since.

== Biography ==
Dave Clarke was born on January 28, 1948. Clarke started playing piano at the age of 4 and guitar at 9. His first record in 1963 (at the age of 15) was produced by Luigi Creatore at New York's Roulette Records. Often confused with his Dave Clark Five namesake, his 1971 solo album Pale Horse saw him temporarily renamed as Dave Carlsen. The album featured Keith Moon and Noel Redding.

He also auditioned for David Bowie at the Lyceum in 1971 but didn't go on the Ziggy Stardust Tour.

Clarke formed The Noel Redding Band with Redding, Les Sampson and Eric Bell (after false starts with Pete Kircher, Mickey Gee and Mick Taylor). Despite the name, the band's songwriting and lead vocal duties were shared equally by Clarke and Redding. The band went on to two singles, two albums on RCA (Clonakilty Cowboys and Blowin') and four major US tours. Another album was eventually released later on Dave's own Mouse Record label. He then formed White Line with Jimmy McCulloch and his brother Jack, releasing two singles and one album.

Clarke met Carl Wilson and Bruce Johnston in London in 1977 and went to California on the Beach Boys payroll. He formed a band in Los Angeles with members of Spirit, Jo Jo Gunne and The Undisputed Truth – all Clarke's songs, some of which were later released on his second solo album under the name The Dream Machine. Jimmy McCulloch instigated another new LA band featuring Jim, Dave, Carl Wilson and Terry Kath. Terry died prematurely, the band would soon follow. Songwriter throughout for Southern Music, ATV Music, Screen Gems and Heath-Levy.

Dave Clarke joined the Royal Navy in 1979 and after active service in the Falklands War and elsewhere, retired as Commander in 1992. He then set up Mouse Records and formed Shut Up Frank with Mick Avory, Noel Redding, Jim Leverton, Richard Simmons and Dave Rowberry.

He collaborated on and off with Tim Rose from 1974 until Tim's death in 2002, including shows in Ireland and England and three albums.

He has been lead singer and lead guitarist with The Kast Off Kinks since 1994.
