= Noel Redding =

English musician (1945–2003)

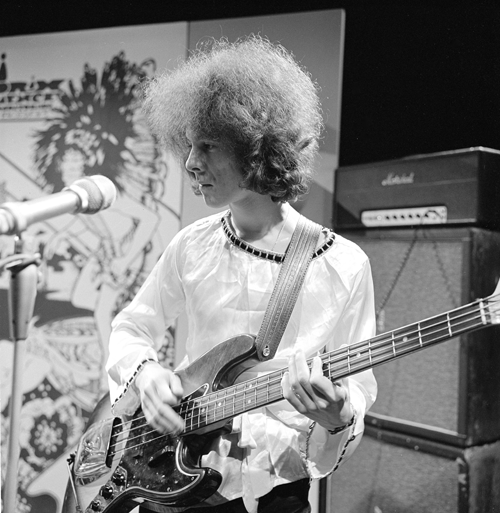
- Redding with the Jimi Hendrix Experience in 1967

Background information
- Born: David Noel Redding; 25 December 1945; Folkestone, Kent, England
- Died: 11 May 2003 (aged 57) Clonakilty, Ireland
- Genres: Psychedelic rock; folk rock; hard rock; blues rock
- Instruments: Bass guitar; guitar; vocals
- Years active: 1963–2003
- Formerly of: The Jimi Hendrix Experience; Fat Mattress; Road; the Noel Redding Band; Mountain

David Noel Redding (25 December 1945 – 11 May 2003) was an English rock musician, best known as the bass player for the Jimi Hendrix Experience and guitarist/singer for Fat Mattress.

Following his departure from the Experience in 1969 and the dissolution of Fat Mattress in 1970, Redding formed the short-lived group Road in the United States, which released the self-titled album Road before he re-located to Clonakilty, Ireland, in 1972. There he formed the Noel Redding Band with former Thin Lizzy guitarist Eric Bell, with whom he released two albums. Although by the 1980s Redding had largely removed himself from the music business, he would later perform around his new hometown with wife Carol Appleby.

He was inducted into the Rock and Roll Hall of Fame in 1992 as a member of the Jimi Hendrix Experience.

== Biography ==
=== Background ===
Redding was born at the Royal Victoria Hospital in Folkestone, Kent, to Bromley-born Margaret (née Berggren) and Horace Albert Redding. He grew up on Cliff Road, Seabrook, where his mother ran a guest house, with his Swedish-born grandmother, his brother Anthony, and his sister Vicki. He attended St Leonards Primary school in Hythe, and the Harvey Grammar School in Folkestone. At the age of nine he played violin at school, and then mandolin and guitar. His first public appearances were at the Hythe Youth Club, and at his school.

At 17, Redding became a professional musician and toured clubs in Scotland and Germany with Neil Landon and the Burnettes (formed in late 1962) and the Loving Kind (formed in November 1965). In addition, the Lonely Ones reunited in September 1964, and Redding remained with them a year before taking his leave.

=== The Jimi Hendrix Experience ===
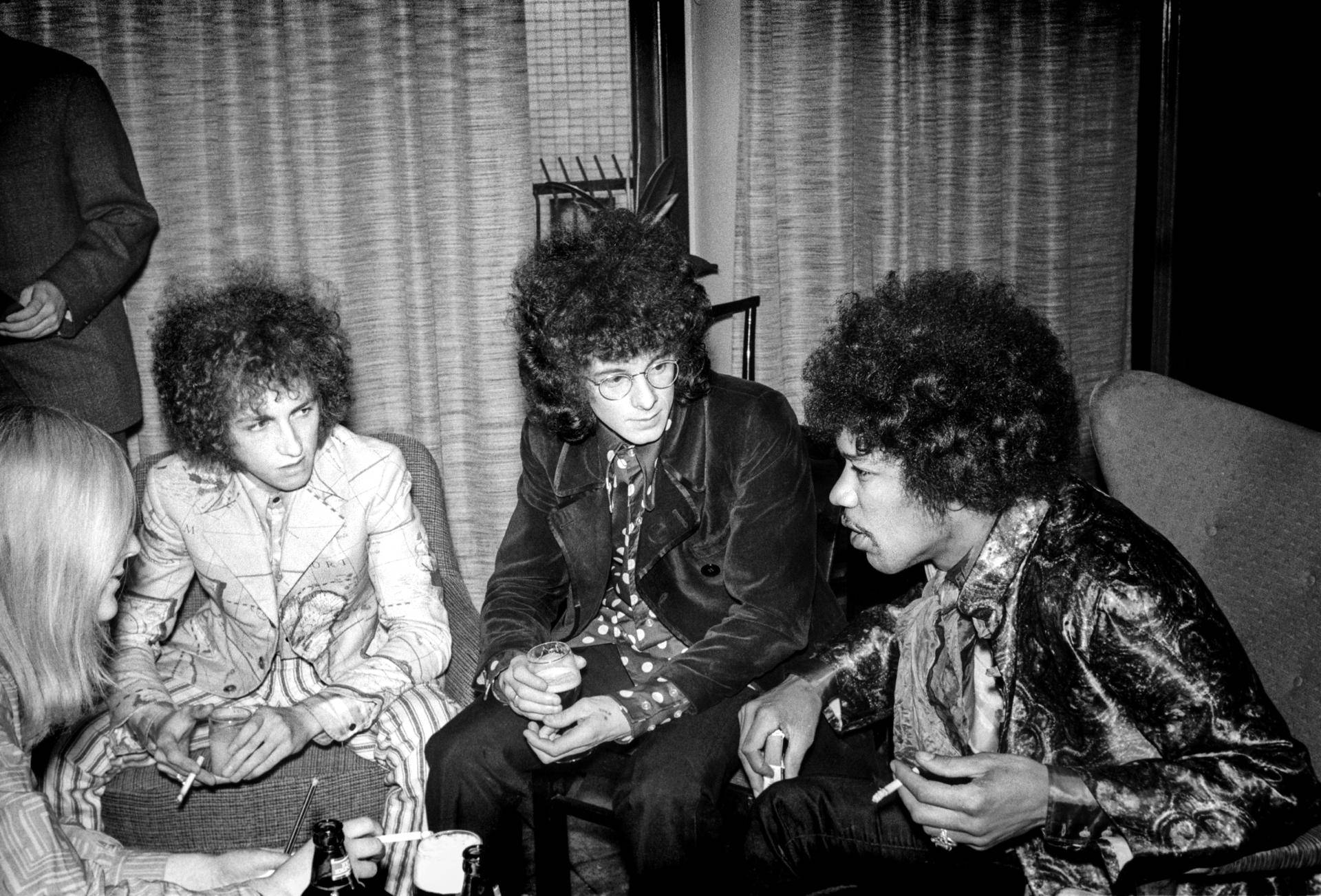
L to R: Mitchell, Redding, Hendrix

Upon his arrival in England in September 1966, Jimi Hendrix and his producer/manager Chas Chandler set about finding backing musicians. Although Redding had played guitar up to that point, he switched to bass guitar and became the second member of the Jimi Hendrix Experience, followed shortly by drummer Mitch Mitchell, to form a power trio. With the group, he recorded three landmark albums: Are You Experienced, Axis: Bold as Love, and Electric Ladyland. Redding also wrote and sang lead on two songs, "Little Miss Strange" and "She's So Fine". His playing style was distinguished by the use of a pick, a mid-range "trebly" sound, and in later years the use of fuzz and distortion effects through overdriven Sunn amps. For the bass line in "Red House" (take used on Smash Hits), Redding was recorded playing on a normal six-string guitar.

By 1969, Hendrix was performing and recording with a number of different musicians. Without consulting Redding, Hendrix announced that he intended to expand the group. Redding responded by quitting the Experience during the American tour on 29 June 1969, and returned to England. However, when Hendrix's attempts to form a new group were unsuccessful, his manager, Michael Jeffery, tried to reunite the Experience in early 1970. The three were interviewed by Rolling Stone magazine to announce the reformation, but ultimately Redding was passed over in favour of bassist Billy Cox, who had performed with Hendrix at Woodstock and on the Band of Gypsys album with Buddy Miles.

=== Fat Mattress ===
In 1968, Redding formed the group Fat Mattress with another Kent musician, Neil Landon. The band also included Jim Leverton on bass and keyboards and Eric Dillon on drums. Redding played guitar and vocals, and a key part of the Fat Mattress sound was the vocal harmonies between him, Landon and Leverton. The band initially toured in support of the Jimi Hendrix Experience, requiring Redding to play two full sets each night. He left Fat Mattress after only one album with them, though some of his compositions would appear on their second album.

== Later years ==
Redding soon went on to other projects. While living in Los Angeles, he formed Road, a three-piece in the same psychedelic hard rock vein as the Experience, with Rod Richards (ex-Rare Earth) on guitar and Les Sampson on drums, and Redding switching back to bass. They released one album, Road (1972), with the three members taking turns on lead vocals.

Redding moved to Ireland in 1972. He formed the Noel Redding Band with Eric Bell (from Thin Lizzy), Dave Clarke, Les Sampson, and Robbie Walsh. Despite the band's name, Redding shared songwriting and lead vocal duties equally with Clarke. They released two albums for RCA, three tours of the Netherlands, two tours of England, one tour of Ireland, and a 10-week tour in the US. The band dissolved after a dispute with their management company. Tracks recorded for a third unreleased album were later released as The Missing Album on Mouse Records.

In his book Are You Experienced?, co-authored with his wife Carol Appleby, he spoke openly about his disappointment in his being cut off from the profits of the continued sale of the Hendrix recordings. He had signed away his royalties in 1974, and in 1980 sold the bass guitar he used with the Experience to a collector. Redding had received $100,000 as a one-off payment after he had been told that there would be no more releases of Jimi Hendrix Experience material. This was before the advent of CDs and DVDs.

In 1990, Redding and Appleby were involved in a car crash returning home from a concert in Glounthaune. Appleby was left brain dead by the accident, with Redding later stating that "she was in intensive care on life support and after four days I had to make the terrible decision of shutting down the machine". They had been together for seventeen years and, just two days prior to the accident, Appleby had finished helping Redding co-write his autobiography.

In 1997, Fender produced the Noel Redding Signature Jazz bass in a signed limited edition of 1000. Premiered at the NAMM Show in January 1997, the bass was based on the 1965 Jazz bass which Redding used throughout his time with the Experience. Redding tracked down the person to whom he had sold the bass some years prior, who agreed to allow Fender to inspect it. Redding stated that "Fender got the original bass from him, copied it, and sent me a prototype, and it was exactly the same as my original bass; they did a brilliant job".

After meeting San Francisco musician and songwriter Keith Dion in London during the awarding of an English Heritage Blue Plaque Award in 1997, Redding performed several tours across the United States with Dion's band "3:05 AM". Recordings from these tours were released on the UK and European releases "West Cork Tuning" and "Stone Free". Video footage from these tours was shown in May 2014 during the now annual Noel Redding Tribute Festival held in Clonakilty each year. Positive feedback was also received from the Irish Cultural Minister and the head of the Irish Film Board.

In 2002, a live album Live From Bunkr · Prague was released. Predominantly made up of Experience material, the concert was recorded in 1995 in the Czech Republic with guitarist and singer Anthony Krizan of the Spin Doctors, rhythm guitarist Ivan Král of the Patti Smith Group and drummer Frankie LaRocka. The band rehearsed for a mere 45 minutes before performing. Václav Havel, the then President of the Czech Republic watched from the side of the stage.

Redding's last performance was in Clonakilty at De Barras pub, where he had held the Friday night residency for nearly 20 years, performing with some of the local musicians who appeared on his last album Thank You, Goodnight and Good Luck including Steve Pawsey, Jeff Ward, Jim O'Neil, Eric Bell and Les Sampson.

== Death ==
Redding was found dead in his home in Clonakilty on 11 May 2003, three weeks after the death of his mother. A postmortem was carried out on 13 May at Cork University Hospital in Wilton, Cork. The report concluded that Redding died from "shock haemorrhage due to oesophageal varices in reaction to cirrhosis of the liver". He was 57 years old and survived by a brother, a sister and a son, Nicolas Noel Redding, by his former wife, Danish-born Susanne.

== Legacy ==
In the village of Ardfield, local people erected a plaque to Redding's memory. His then-girlfriend, the US-born Deborah McNaughton, had returned to America where she died from breast cancer nine months after Redding's death.

Three months prior to his death, Redding had threatened to sue Experience Hendrix, LLC, the company that manages the Hendrix catalogue, for £3.26 million in lost earnings. The estate rejected his claim and went on to release a posthumous compilation album entitled The Experience Sessions in 2004. Along with unreleased takes of Redding-penned Experience album tracks "She's So Fine" and "Little Miss Strange", the album contained unreleased songs recorded by The Jimi Hendrix Experience which Redding had written whilst with the band. Most of the tracks are outtakes from the Axis: Bold As Love and Electric Ladyland albums, and feature Redding on guitar with Hendrix on bass. It also featured a live version of Hendrix's "Red House" with Redding on rhythm guitar. Notably the album features the song "Dream", but omits the other Redding-penned song "Dance" which was recorded during the same session on which Hendrix participated on bass. Written by Redding for drummer Mitch Mitchell to sing, Hendrix would later take Redding's guitar riff and use it for his own song "Ezy Rider", which was first released on the posthumous album The Cry of Love.

A town square in Redding's hometown of Folkestone was renamed "Noel's Yard" as a memorial, described as being "a public 'Theatre in a Square' which promotes commerce, the arts, entertainment, as well as the best of British seaside living within a vibrant and safe creative community".

In 2013, an art exhibition was organised to mark the 10th anniversary of Redding's death. It was opened by his brother Anthony.

== Discography ==
The Loving Kind

- "Accidental Love" / "Nothing Can Change This Love" (Piccadilly 7N 35299) 1966
- "Love the Things You Do" / "Treat Me Nice" (Piccadilly 7N 35318) 1966
- "Ain't That Peculiar" / "With Rhyme and Reason" (Piccadilly 7N 35342) 1966

The Jimi Hendrix Experience

For a more complete listing of Redding's recordings with Hendrix, see Jimi Hendrix discography and Jimi Hendrix posthumous discography.

- Are You Experienced (1967)
- Axis: Bold as Love (1967)
- Electric Ladyland (1968)

Fat Mattress

- Fat Mattress (1969)
- Fat Mattress II (1970)
- "Naturally" / "Iridescent Butterfly" (1969)
- "Magic Lanterns" / "Bright New Way" (1969)
- "Highway" / "Black Sheep of the Family" (1970, co-wrote the A-side only, no performance)

Road

- Road (1972)

Randy California

- Kapt. Kopter and the (Fabulous) Twirly Birds (1972, appears pseudonymously on three songs)

Noel Redding Band (also known as the Clonakilty Cowboys)

- Clonakilty Cowboys (1975)
- Blowin' (1976)
- The Missing Album (1995)
- "Roller Coaster Kids" / "Snowstorm"
- "Take It Easy" / "Back on the Road Again"

Lord Sutch and Heavy Friends

- Lord Sutch and Heavy Friends (1970)

British Invasion All-Stars

- British Invasion All-Stars (2001)

305 AM and Keith Dion

- West Cork Tuning (2001)
- West Coast Experience (2002)
- Stone Free (2003)
- On Tour with 305 AM (2003)
- West Cork Tuning Deluxe Edition (2003)

Noel Redding and Friends

- Live From Bunkr · Prague (2002)
- Thank You, Goodnight and Gud' Luck (2009)

Yardbirds Experience

- Family Tree: Birds of a Feather (2006)

== Sources ==
- Obituary from Billboard.com
