= Eric Bell =

Northern Irish rock and blues musician (born 1947)

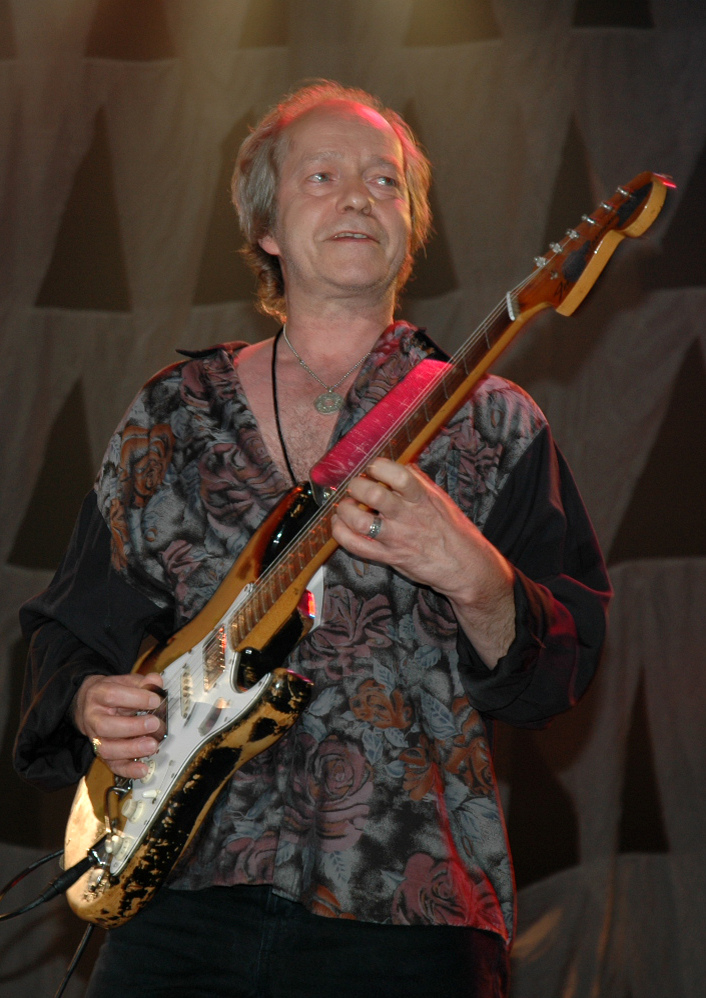
- Bell in 2005

Background information
- Born: Eric Robin Bell; 3 September 1947 (age 79); England
- Origin: Belfast, Northern Ireland
- Genres: Rock; blues rock; folk rock
- Occupations: Musician; songwriter
- Instruments: Guitar; vocals
- Years active: 1966 – present
- Member of: Eric Bell Band
- Formerly of: Them; Thin Lizzy; The Noel Redding Band

Eric Robin Bell (born 3 September 1947) is a Northern Irish rock and blues musician, best known as a founding member and the original guitarist of the rock group Thin Lizzy, of which he was a member from 1969 to 1973. After his time in Thin Lizzy, he briefly fronted his own group before joining the Noel Redding Band in the mid-1970s. He has since released several solo albums and performs regularly with a blues-based trio, the Eric Bell Band.

== Career ==
=== Early career ===
Bell was born in England on 3 September 1947 and brought up as a young child in Belfast, Northern Ireland, by his adoptive sibling-parents Harold and Ivy Bell. From Jocelyn Avenue, Woodstock Road, in the east of the city, he attended Orangefield High School. As a boy he was enthralled by the music of Lonnie Donegan and "mesmerised" by the guitars in the Shadows. He began his career with local groups around the Belfast area, including the last incarnation of Them to feature Van Morrison, between September and October 1966. He also played with a number of other bands including Shades of Blue, The Earth Dwellers and The Bluebeats, before joining an Irish showband named The Dreams. He left in 1969, having tired of the showband format, and at the end of that year formed a band with Irish musicians Phil Lynott, Eric Wrixon and Brian Downey. Bell suggested the name Thin Lizzy, after Tin Lizzie, a robot character in The Dandy comic.

=== Thin Lizzy ===
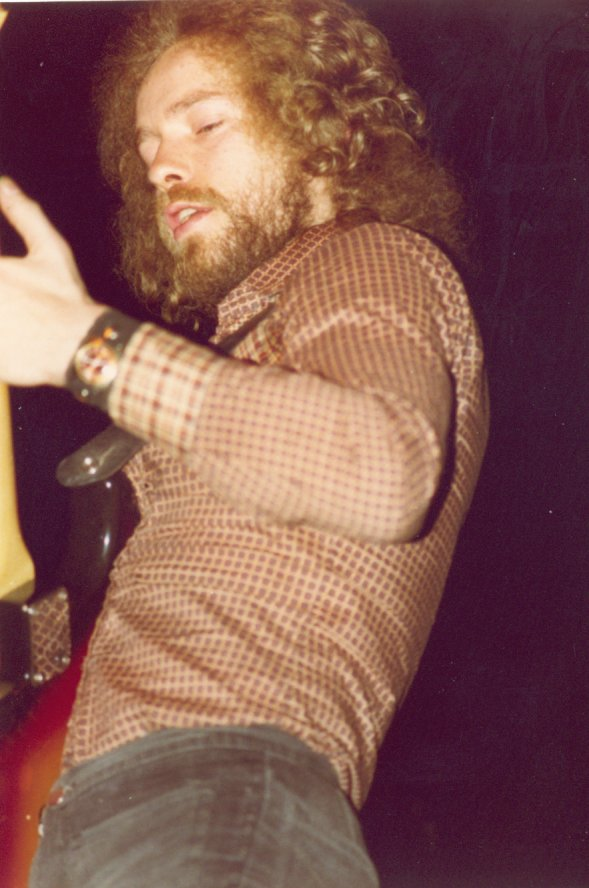
Eric Bell with Thin Lizzy, 1972

Organist Eric Wrixon left Thin Lizzy after a few months and the remaining trio later secured a contract with Decca Records. As lead guitarist, Bell played on Thin Lizzy's first three albums Thin Lizzy, Shades of a Blue Orphanage and Vagabonds of the Western World, as well as their hit single "Whiskey in the Jar". He co-wrote a number of songs with Lynott and Downey, including "The Rocker" which became a live favourite throughout the band's career. He also composed one song on his own, "Ray Gun", from their first album, Thin Lizzy.

Although Thin Lizzy gained in popularity during the early 1970s, the pressures of recording, touring, and the excesses of the rock star lifestyle began to take their toll. He left the band after a New Year's Eve concert in 1973, after throwing his guitar into the air, pushing the amplifiers into the audience, and storming off stage. He stated later that he had no regrets about leaving: "I really had to leave because of ill-health. It was exhaustion, and the majority of things that were available to me... I couldn't really handle it." He was temporarily replaced by Gary Moore.

=== The Noel Redding Band ===
In 1974, after a brief period fronting his own Eric Bell Band, Bell was recruited by ex-Jimi Hendrix sideman Noel Redding, along with guitarist/singer Dave Clarke and drummer Les Sampson, to form the Noel Redding Band. Bell was unsure of the musical direction Redding was taking, but went on to record two albums with the group before they split in 1976. A third album of unused tracks was released in 1995. Bell composed the song "Love and War" for the second album, Blowin'.

=== The 1980s and Mainsqueeze ===
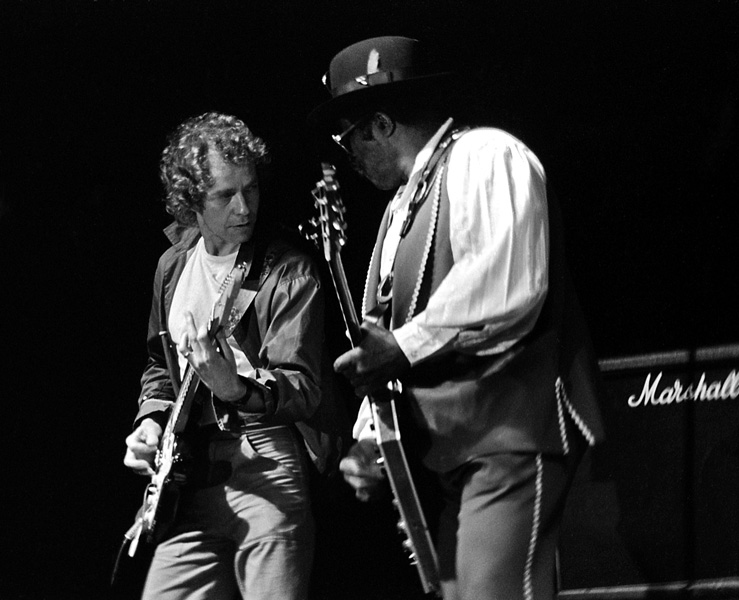
Bell and Bo Diddley performing with Mainsqueeze in Novi Sad, former Yugoslavia, 27 February 1984

In 1980, Bell reunited with Thin Lizzy to record a tribute song to Jimi Hendrix, "Song for Jimmy" [sic], which was released as an orange flexi disc and given away with Flexipop in August 1981. It was later included on Thin Lizzy's Vagabonds, Kings, Warriors, Angels box set in 2002, although much of Eric Bell's lead guitar work was missing from this version as the relevant master tapes could not be found. Bell also appeared as a guest on Thin Lizzy's final tour in 1983 and the accompanying live album, Life.

Bell had also reactivated his own band in the late 1970s and released an EP in 1981.

Bell subsequently joined saxophonist Dick Heckstall-Smith's eight-piece blues rock ensemble Mainsqueeze. They toured Europe, recorded a live album in 1983 and later toured as Bo Diddley's backing group, recording the Hey... Bo Diddley: In Concert album in 1986.

=== Later career ===
Bell has continued to perform and record with the Eric Bell Band throughout the 1990s and 2000s, releasing several albums. He has also recorded with the Barrelhouse Brothers.

In 2005, he joined Gary Moore onstage to perform "Whiskey in the Jar" at the Phil Lynott tribute concert "The Boy Is Back in Town" in the Point Theatre, Dublin. This was released on a DVD called One Night in Dublin: A Tribute to Phil Lynott. Bell lived in Dublin, then London before moving to West Cork, Ireland, then to Carrowdore in the Ards Peninsula, County Down.

Bell later blasted heavy metal band Metallica for failing to pay him £2,000 for a live show in Dublin in 1999.

In November 2024, Bell received the Legend Award at the Northern Ireland Music Prizes.

== Discography ==
=== Thin Lizzy ===
- Thin Lizzy (1971)
- Shades of a Blue Orphanage (1972)
- Vagabonds of the Western World (1973)
- "Song for Jimmy" – Flexipop single (1981)
- Life (1983) (1 track)

=== The Noel Redding Band ===
- Clonakilty Cowboys (1975)
- Blowin' (1976)
- The Missing Album (1995)

=== Eric Bell Band ===
- "The Eric Bell Band E.P." (1981)
- "Lonely Man / Anyone Seen My Baby" – single version of the E.P. (1981)
- Live Tonite (Sweden, 1996)
- Irish Boy (Spain, 1998)
- Live Tonite Plus (Extra tracks, 2001)
- A Blues Night in Dublin (2002)
- Lonely Nights in London (2010)
- Belfast Blues in a Jar (2012)
- "Lonely Man " – 10inch vinyl (2021)

=== Eric Bell ===
- Exile (2015)
- Standing at a Bus Stop (2017)

=== Mainsqueeze ===
- Live at Ronnie Scott's Club (France, 1983)
- Hey... Bo Diddley: In Concert – as backing group for Bo Diddley (1986)

=== Others ===
- The Dreams – The Best of Dreams (1969)
- Whistler – Ho Hum (1971)
- Brush Shiels – Brush Shiels (1977)
- Smiley Bolger – Ode to a Black Man (1991)
- Honeyboy Hickling – Straight from the Harp (2000)
- Barrelhouse Brothers – Pick It Up, Pass It On (2002)
- The Animals and Friends – Instinct (2004)
