= Fat Mattress =

English rock band

- Origin: Folkestone, England
- Genres: Folk rock; psychedelic rock; progressive rock
- Years active: 1968–1970
- Labels: Original; Polydor (UK), Atco (US); Post-breakup; Sequel, Esoteric
- Past members: Neil Landon; Noel Redding; Jim Leverton; Eric Dillon; Steve Hammond; Mick Weaver

Fat Mattress were an English rock band that formed in Folkestone in 1968. Founded by guitarist and vocalist Noel Redding, during his time as bassist for The Jimi Hendrix Experience, and vocalist Neil Landon, the band was completed by multi-instrumentalist Jim Leverton, drummer Eric Dillon and keyboardist Mick Weaver. The band released two albums – Fat Mattress and Fat Mattress II – before splitting up in 1970.

== History ==
Fat Mattress was formed in late 1968 by Noel Redding with vocalist Neil Landon, bass guitarist Jim Leverton and drummer Eric Dillon. Redding (from Folkestone) and Leverton (from Dover) had been involved in the flourishing early 1960s group scene in South East Kent which also included Landon (who hailed originally from Kirdford, Sussex). Dillon (from Swindon, Wiltshire) was brought in by Leverton who had met him while playing in Engelbert Humperdinck's backing band. The band was formed while Redding was a member of the Jimi Hendrix Experience, with a view to enabling Redding to play guitar and to sing lead, as well as to record original material. While he had done all three things with the Experience, they were restricted to rare occasions. Martin Barre was briefly a member of the band, but soon left to replace Mick Abrahams in Jethro Tull.

The first major public exposure of the band was as the opening act to the Jimi Hendrix Experience on a tour of the United States, during which Redding performed with both bands. Landon, Redding, and Leverton all sang lead, allowing the group to employ vocal harmonies.

The group was signed to Polydor Records and released the eponymous Fat Mattress album in 1969. The album was modestly successful, with one song, "Magic Forest" becoming a hit in the Netherlands.

In August 1969, the band made an appearance at the Isle of Wight Festival in front of a crowd of an estimated 120,000 people. The line-up also included Bob Dylan & The Band, The Nice, The Pretty Things, The Who, and the Bonzo Dog Doo-Dah Band.

On 27 September 1969, Fat Mattress (along with The Who) appeared on the German TV show, Beat-Club. They performed three songs; "Naturally", "Mr. Moonshine" and "Magic Forest".

On 22 February 1970, Fat Mattress headlined over David Bowie's new band Hype at the Roundhouse, a gig later described by the BBC as "arguably ... mark[ing] the birth of glam rock."

A major U.S. tour was cancelled after completing only five dates of an initially anticipated 30. In the midst of recording Fat Mattress II, Redding and Leverton had a falling out, resulting in Redding's departure from the band. He was replaced by Steve Hammond at roughly the same time as Mick Weaver was added to relieve Leverton on keyboard duties, allowing Leverton to focus on bass and vocals. Fat Mattress II was less of a success than their debut, and the band split in the middle of recording what would have been their third album.

== Band members ==
- Neil Landon – vocals (1968–1970; died 2020)
- Jim Leverton – bass, vocals, harpsichord, organ (1968–1970)
- Eric Dillon – drums, percussion (1968–1970)
- Noel Redding – guitar, vocals (1968–1970; died 2003)
- Steve Hammond – guitar (1970; died 1994)
- Mick Weaver – keyboards (1970)

== Discography ==
=== Studio albums ===
- Fat Mattress (1969) U.S. No. 134
- Fat Mattress II (1970)

=== Compilation albums ===
- The Black Sheep of the Family: The Anthology (2000)
- Magic Forest: The Anthology (2006)

=== Singles ===
- from Fat Mattress:
  - "Magic Forest"/"Petrol Pump Assistant" (1969)
- from Fat Mattress II:
  - "Naturally"/"Iridescent Butterfly" (1969)
  - "Highway"/"Black Sheep of the Family" (1970)
- Non-album singles:
  - "Magic Lanterns"/"Bright New Way" (1970)
