= Nick Tauber =

British record producer

Nick Tauber is a British record producer best known for his work with Thin Lizzy, Toyah and Marillion in the 1970s and 1980s. Nick Tauber continues to manage, produce, and consult with acts/artists/and producers. In the late 1990s, Tauber was involved with British pop/punk act Kowloon, guiding them through several UK, and European tours. In the early 2000s, he managed British rock act Nine Miles Wide, UK bands Freak, The Cornerstones, Girlband "Blush", and The Revenge.

== Albums produced by Tauber ==
- Thin Lizzy, Shades of a Blue Orphanage (1972)
- Thin Lizzy, Vagabonds of the Western World (1973)
- Slaughter & The Dogs, Do It Dog Style (1978)
- Cock Sparrer, True Grit (1978)
- Thin Lizzy, The Continuing Saga of the Ageing Orphans (1979)
- Girl, Sheer Greed (1980)
- Toyah, Toyah! Toyah! Toyah! (1980)
- Toyah, Anthem (1981)
- Secret Affair, Business as Usual (1982)
- Stiff Little Fingers, Now Then... (1982)
- Bernie Tormé, Turn Out the Lights (1982)
- Toyah, Warrior Rock: Toyah on Tour (1982)
- Specimen, Batastrophe (1983)
- Toyah, Love Is the Law (1983)
- Marillion, Script for a Jester's Tear (1983)
- Silent Running, When the 12th of Never Comes (1983)
- Marillion, Fugazi (1984)
- Spear of Destiny, One Eyed Jacks (1984)
- The Armoury Show, "Castles in Spain" (single) (1985)
- Girlschool, Running Wild (1985)
- UFO, Misdemeanor (1985)
- Venom, Calm Before the Storm (1987)
- The Band of Holy Joy, Manic, Magic, Majestic (1989)
- Venom, Prime Evil (1989)
- Venom, Tear Your Soul Apart (1990)
- The Band of Holy Joy, Positively Spooked (1990)
- The Brink, Nowhere To Run (2019)
