= Brian Tesler =

British television producer (1929–2024)

Brian Tesler CBE
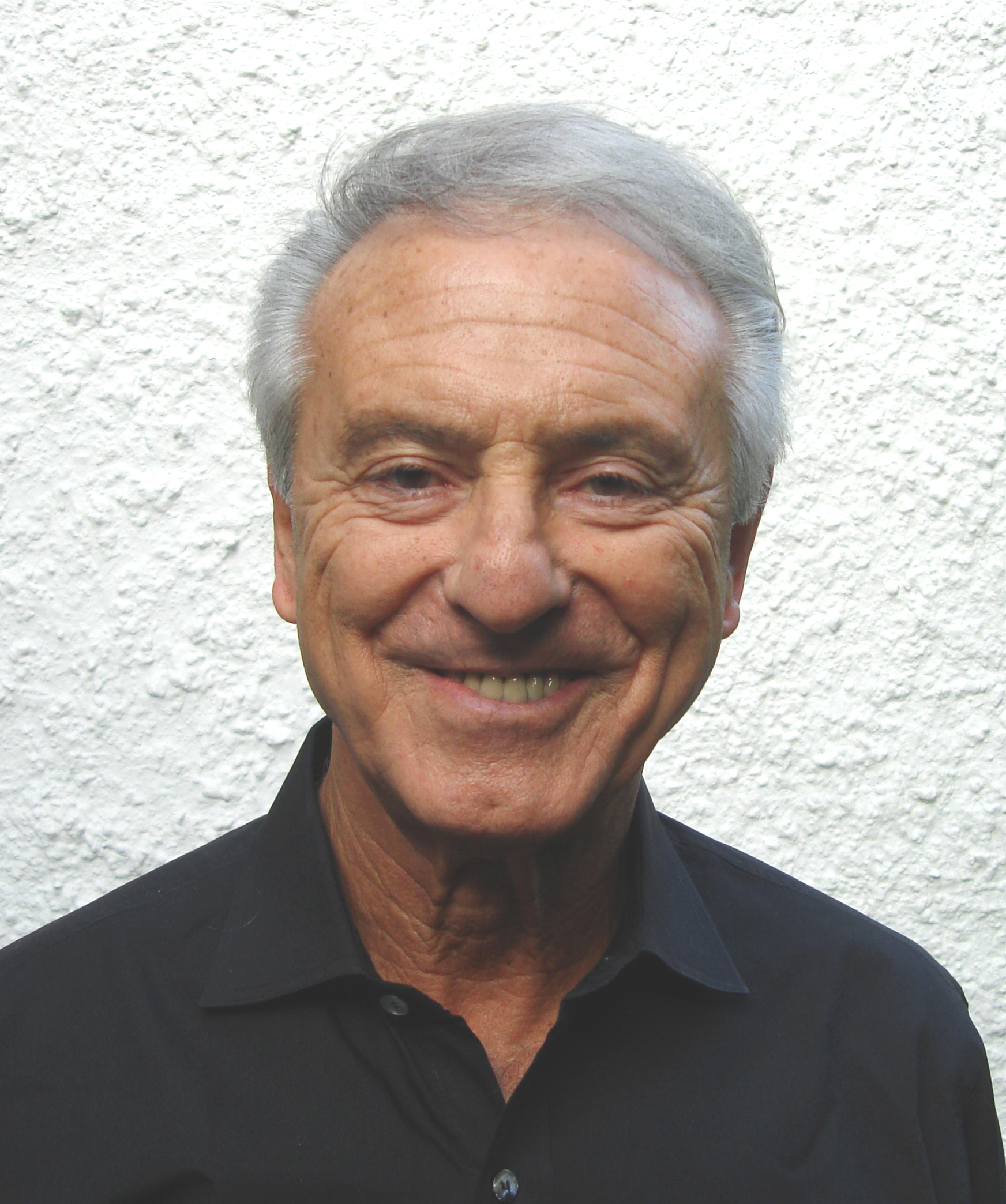
- Born: 19 February 1929; Stepney, London, England
- Died: 30 October 2024 (aged 95)
- Education: Exeter College, Oxford
- Occupations: Television producer and executive
- Years active: 1952–1994
- Spouse: Audrey Maclean (m. 1959; died 2008)
- Children: 1

Brian Tesler, CBE (19 February 1929 – 30 October 2024) was a British television entertainment producer and senior executive. His career encompassed British television's post-war evolution from a single-channel BBC to the arrival of multiple terrestrial, satellite and cable channels in the 1990s. After experience in radio presentation with the British Forces Broadcasting Service in the 1940s he began in television as a light entertainment producer and director for BBC Television in 1952, producing mainly panel shows before gaining experience and working his way upwards to producing larger and more significant programmes. He moved to Britain's fledgling independent commercial television service ITV in 1957, joining Associated Television (ATV), who held the franchise for weekends in London. Here he took over ITV's biggest variety show, Sunday Night at the London Palladium.

In 1960 Tesler moved into executive management by becoming Supervisor of Features and Light Entertainment at ABC Weekend TV which provided commercial television for the North of England and the Midlands. Tesler was promoted to be ABC's Programme Controller in 1962 and two years later Director of Programmes. In 1968 he became Director of Programmes at Thames Television which provided weekday programmes in London.

In 1974 Tesler was invited to become Deputy Managing Director of London Weekend Television (LWT) and in 1976 he became LWT's Chief Executive. He resigned in 1990, remaining deputy chairman until his retirement from television in 1994.

== Early life ==
Tesler was born in Stepney, east London on 19 February 1929. His Jewish father, David, came to England from Ukraine in 1916, setting up his own hatmaking business. His mother, Esther Hyman, also Jewish, was born in Mile End in East London, her parents having emigrated from Russia in about 1893. Her father was a baker.

Tesler was educated at the Chiswick County School for Boys in West London. As well as its academic excellence and absence of antisemitism Tesler found the extra-curricular activities there, including its drama opportunities, to be to his liking. Tesler loved the music hall and variety shows and was a regular visitor to the major entertainment theatres in London. In later life he credited his youthful enjoyment of all aspects of show business as a valuable self-education which prepared him for his career in light entertainment.

One of the teachers at his school encouraged Tesler's interest in reading, turning it into a love of English literature, and persuaded him that a University of Oxford degree in English was something to which he could aspire. Another teacher, responsible for the school's drama projects, encouraged Tesler's growing interest in the theatre by casting him prominently and successfully in school plays. Tesler won a scholarship for a university place to be taken up after his two-year National Service in the Army.

Tesler was mustered in the Royal Artillery in the summer of 1947 but after auditioning was posted to the British Forces Broadcasting Service (BFBS) radio station in Trieste in Northern Italy as a presenter. He stayed in the BFBS in Trieste until he was demobilised in September 1949.

Tesler's scholarship took him to Exeter College, Oxford in Autumn 1949 to read English Literature and Language. After three years during which there was some concern from his tutors that he was spending more time with show business activities than his studies, he graduated in 1952 with a First Class Honours Degree, with the highest marks in his year, in English. While at Oxford Tesler was a member of the Oxford University Dramatic Society (OUDS), joined the reporting team on The Isis Magazine, sang occasionally with the University Jazz Club and wrote and sold songs with fellow student, the composer Stanley Myers.

== BBC Television ==
Tesler joined BBC Television as a trainee Light Entertainment producer in 1952, recruited on a six-months trial. His first television production, which he also directed, was a musical show called Starlight starring Pat Kirkwood singing and dancing to the music of Eric Robinson's orchestra. It was transmitted on 2 January 1953. Tesler followed this with similar programmes starring Joyce Grenfell and the singing duo Pearl Carr and Teddy Johnson.

Tesler then rescued a failing panel-game, Down You Go!, which encouraged the BBC to make him producer of a new panel-game for Sunday nights, called Why?. This, however, was "a resounding flop", as Tesler wrote later. It was cancelled after only three shows. Despite this failure Tesler was put in charge of the Light Entertainment Department's output of panel games, both finding and producing or supervising them, which he proceeded to do by introducing Guess My Story, Find the Link, Tall Story Club, One of the Family and The Name's the Same, as well as having overall responsibility for the long-running What's My Line?.

BBC Television Presentation logo from the 1950s

Tesler quickly gained in experience and while continuing to produce panel games he worked his way upwards at the BBC, developing and producing larger and more significant shows. He produced a pilot show for a possible new series written by the radio writers Frank Muir and Denis Norden for the husband and wife light comedy team, Bernard Braden and Barbara Kelly. Barbara with Braden transmitted in July 1953 and was well received by the critics, though the series did not appear for another two years, and was then titled Bath-Night With Braden. It was the first comedy show to transmit on a weekly basis rather than once a fortnight. And So to Bentley, a series also written by Muir and Nordern, featuring the Australian comic actor Dick Bentley with Peter Sellers and Bill Fraser, was regarded as a flop, but showed Tesler had increasing confidence in comedy direction and confirmed to him the value of a live studio audience. Fast and Loose was another comedy series, this time written by Bob Monkhouse and Dennis Goodwin. It was the first series to show their talents as performers as well as writers.

Tesler's musical talents encouraged him to develop music shows was well as comedy. Among them was Music and Magic, described by Radio Times as "a miscellany of music, dance and illusion", which featured illusionists like David Nixon and performers like Frankie Vaughan together with some technical trickery. Tesler broke some boundaries with We Got Rhythm, a show with an all-black cast of singers, dancers and cabaret artistes, including Leslie "Hutch" Hutchinson. Frank Chacksfield's light music orchestra was of symphonic size but Tesler was able to use all the television techniques then at his disposal to convert what would otherwise be essentially a radio programme into a television show spectacular. The television spectacle of The Great Little Tilley was only possible by Tesler organising a two-studio production utilising studios D and E at the BBC's Lime Grove Studios in West London, staging dramatic sequences about the life and times of the male impersonator Vesta Tilley in one studio and her music hall performing sequences in the other, while Pat Kirkwood as Tilley in a live production was forced to rush backwards and forwards between the two.

In January 1955, after two years under contract to BBC Television, Tesler signed with the BBC for a further two years. His new contract barred him from working for any of the new commercial television stations being set up to launch Independent Television (ITV) in Britain. Tesler later wrote in his autobiography that "the idea of working in the cut-throat commercial world was repugnant," and that he felt his future at the BBC held plenty of attractive production prospects. At the time he was in the middle of the first season of Ask Pickles, a popular television vehicle for the radio star Wilfred Pickles.

With Ask Pickles, Tesler invented British television's first "sentimental" request show in which viewers could have their wishes come true. Pickles wanted to expand into television and to do that Tesler devised a new show. "Wilfred Pickles invites you to Ask Pickles for the things you would like to see and hear," announced Radio Times. Tesler's office received as many as 10,000 request letters a week from viewers and Ask Pickles became the most popular show on television, scoring appreciation ratings in the 90s. Tesler won the first ever Light Entertainment (Production) Award from the Guild of Television Producers and Directors (now the British Academy of Film and Television Arts [BAFTA]) for Ask Pickles in December 1957.

Another radio star who wanted to break into television was the bandleader Billy Cotton. Tesler was given the task of devising a television version of Cotton's long-running Sunday lunchtime BBC Radio show. As a music hall devotee and avid radio listener, Tesler knew Cotton's act well and knew what would work. He brought in a comedy scriptwriter, engaged guest artistes for comedy routines with Cotton and the band, and even persuaded the 60-year-old Cotton to join in dance routines with a line of dancers, The Leslie Roberts Silhouettes. The Billy Cotton Band Show became a long-running light entertainment success for BBC Television for twelve years, Tesler producing it for its first season.

Towards the end of that first season with Cotton, it was announced by Val Parnell, the chief executive of Associated Television (ATV), that Tesler, "one of television's top producers", would join the staff of ATV on 1 January 1957. As Tesler's BBC contract was drawing to a close at the end of 1956 he was offered a further two years, but the BBC refused to increase his pay, saying, as later reported by Tesler, "working for the BBC is reward enough". Discovering that a disappointed Tesler might be available, Parnell and his deputy, Lew Grade, offered Tesler double his BBC salary for three years with an annual expenses-paid trip to New York to study US television thrown in. His views on commercial television expressed two years previously had changed. "Personally I think that this is the right time for me, having enjoyed the privileges of BBC television," he told TV Mirror, "to go out into the cut-and-thrust of commercial TV." ATV held the major ITV contracts for the weekends in London and weekdays in the English Midlands and was eager to transmit a lot of light entertainment, Tesler's speciality.

Tesler completed the first season of the Billy Cotton Band Show and initiated and produced the first two programmes of a new series starring Petula Clark, and cast and laid out the rest of the series, before leaving the BBC after four years.

== Associated Television ==
Tesler started at Associated Television in London on 1 January 1957. He was to produce his initial show for the company, an edition of Val Parnell's Saturday Spectacular, for live transmission on 19 January. He told his bosses, Parnell and Lew Grade, that he wanted the singer, dancer and comedian Dickie Henderson to star in it. Parnell tried to veto the choice as he and Henderson had fallen out. Tesler, however, had a clause in his contract that allowed him the power to cast his own programmes. He insisted on Henderson being the star and Parnell was forced to allow it. The show was so popular and Henderson's performance judged so impressive that Parnell encouraged Tesler to bring him back four more times for the Saturday show.

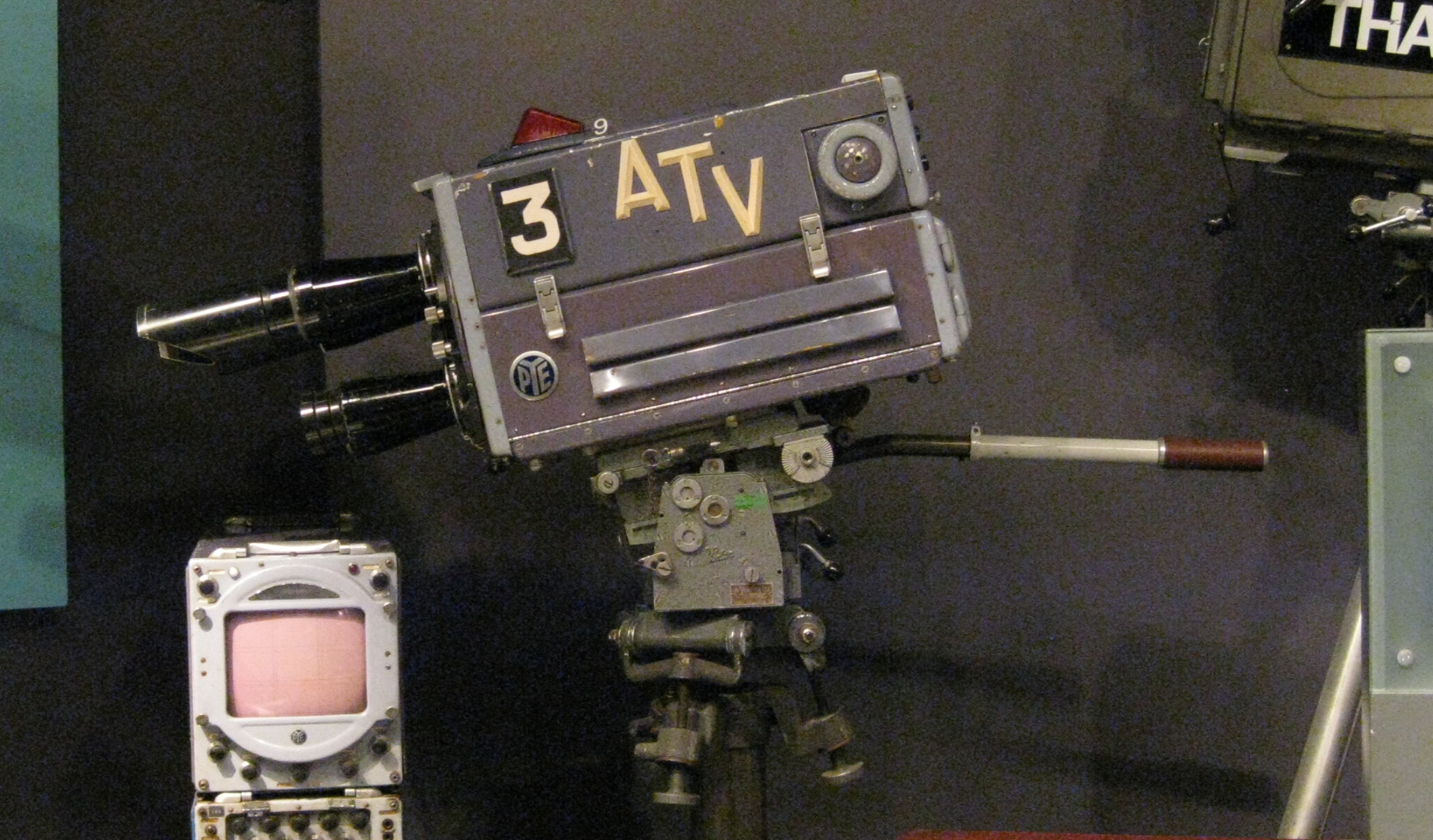
ATV Camera

Tesler became Parnell's favoured producer for Saturday Spectacular. In 1957, Tesler's first year at ATV, he produced Saturday night specials with some of the top British comedy stars of the time like Max Bygraves, Frankie Howerd, Benny Hill, and Norman Wisdom, Americans like Rosemary Clooney, Ray Bolger and Johnnie Ray, and old-time entertainment idols like Jack Buchanan and George Formby. This series of entertainment specials, which ran from November 1956 to March 1961 (though in the last year or so without Tesler as he left ATV at the end of 1959) performed well for audience appreciation, occasionally making it into that week's ten most-watched programmes. The shows were produced at ATV's Wood Green Empire, a 1912 music hall and variety theatre in North London, converted (like several theatres all over the country with the arrival of ITV) into a television studio with the stage extended over the stalls with space for an orchestra, the control room and band room tucked into the old rear stalls area and the audience confined to the circle above it. Nearly all the shows produced by Tesler at ATV were produced at the Wood Green Empire.

While he continued to produce Saturday Spectacular, Tesler was asked by Parnell to take over running Sunday Night at the London Palladium in the autumn of 1957. This show was transmitted 39 weeks a year from the West End's premier variety theatre. It was first broadcast in September 1955 so had been running for two seasons by the time Tesler took it over and in that time only 4 editions had failed to make the Top 10 of British television's most popular programmes. In its heyday 28-million viewers watched it, at that time nearly half the population of the United Kingdom. The comedian Tommy Trinder had always been the compère of the show, but Tesler considered him "old hat" and wanted to replace him. Despite the viewing figures, Tesler also thought the show "had become routine, its novelty and glamour ... fading". To enliven the show Parnell agreed to let Tesler bring in the precision dance troupe the Tiller Girls and asked him to find a way to replace Trinder, who had rattled Tesler already and had offended Parnell and Grade so much they had decided not renew his contract for the 1958–59 season.

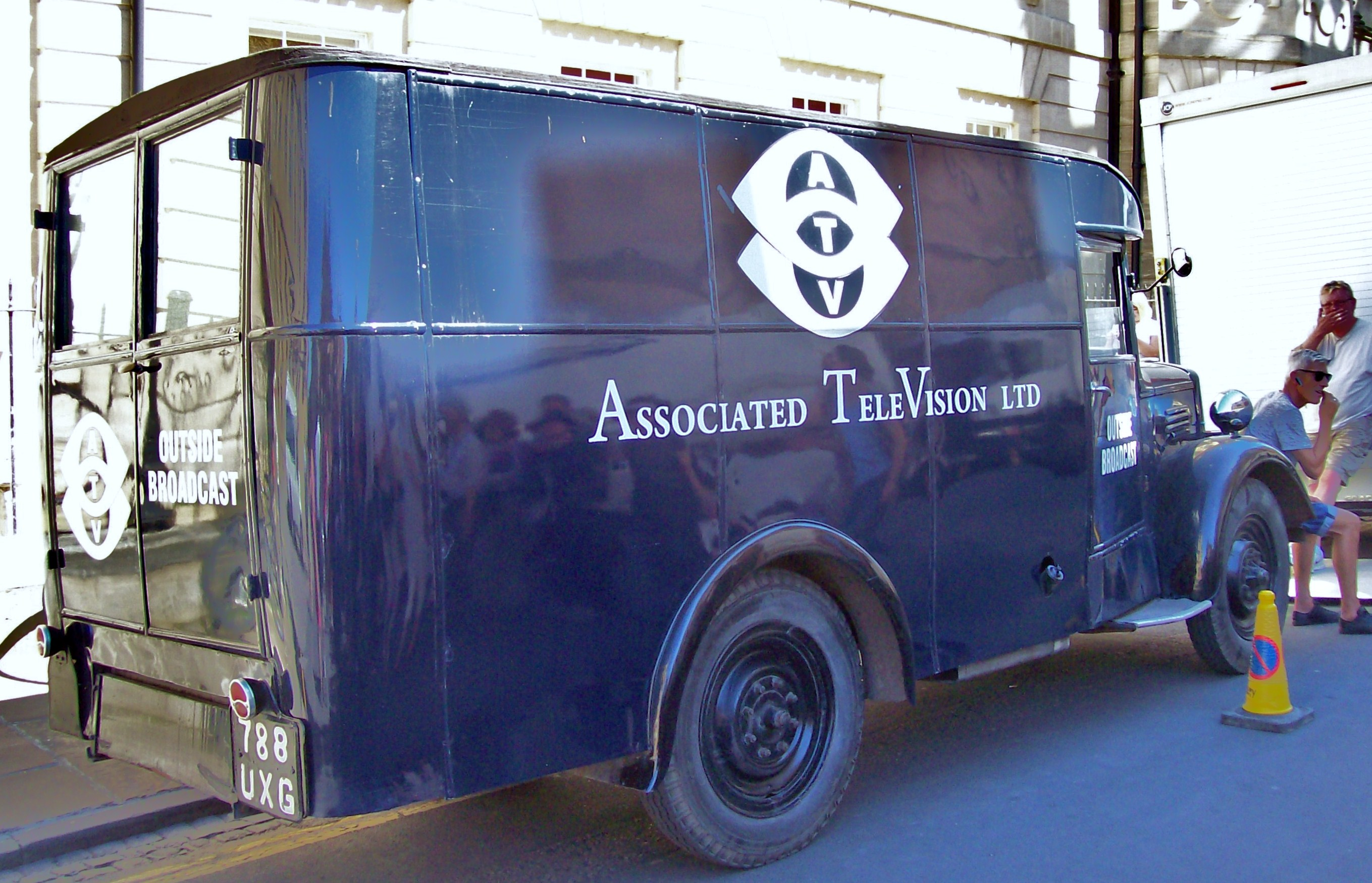
Part of ATV's Outside Broadcast fleet, used to televise shows at the London Palladium in the late 1950s (photographed in 2016)

For the first few months of the 1957–58 season Trinder was taking time off from the Palladium for an extended tour of South Africa. Tesler took the opportunity to engage various compères to take his place temporarily in order to pick the best of them to take over in autumn 1958 when Trinder's contract would not be renewed. He tried out Dickie Henderson, Bob Monkhouse, Hughie Green, Alfred Marks and Robert Morley, each for a few weeks. At the same time, Tesler was producing a show called New Look, with a team of young, mostly unknown, performers, chosen by Tesler. Among them was an all-round dancer, musician and comedian, Bruce Forsyth, who caught Parnell's attention. Tesler and Parnell knew immediately that in Forsyth they had found their new Palladium compère. After a couple of successful tryouts on the Sunday shows Forsyth was engaged full-time to replace Trinder for the 1958–59 season. Within weeks audience figures rose to over 14 million households.

Tesler's show New Look was a studio-based revue with a regular team of young all-round entertainers who could gain television experience and possibly be moulded into star material. Tesler chose wisely. Among them, including Forsyth, were Jack Douglas, Joyce Blair and her brother Lionel Blair, Ronnie Stevens, Jeremy Lloyd and Roy Castle. When Parnell saw Castle in the pilot of New Look he immediately put him into the 1958 Royal Variety Performance.

Tesler continued a heavy production schedule at ATV, making at least one Saturday Spectacular a month and sometimes more often, featuring artistes of the like of Harry Secombe, Bernard Bresslaw, Dave King and Arthur Askey. Once New Look was completed Lew Grade also asked Tesler to come up with an idea to feature the West End's latest showplace, a theatre-restaurant named The Talk of the Town. Tesler brought in outside broadcast cameras to cover live a floorshow in the first half of the programme and a big name cabaret act in the second. Tesler also composed the music for the opening titles. Live from Talk of the Town had a short run in December 1959. Hosted by Noele Gordon it starred among others, Diana Dors, John Bentley, Beryl Reid and Bruce Forsyth. The series ended with a gala edition on New Year's Eve 1959.

Live from Talk of the Town was Tesler's last production for ATV. He had decided he would become a freelancer at the end of his ATV contract so that he could have freedom to pick the shows he wanted to produce. He left ATV on 31 December 1959.

== ABC Television ==
Resolving to become a freelance producer, Tesler lined up contracts with both ATV and the BBC at the beginning of 1960, but before they could begin he was approached by Howard Thomas, the managing director of ABC Weekend TV. ABC held the commercial television franchises for weekends in the North of England and the English Midlands and was one of the so-called "Big Four" companies that between them produced most of the ITV networked programmes. Thomas invited Tesler to become ABC's Supervisor of Features and Light Entertainment. Thomas offered him a "free hand" answerable only to him. Tesler was wary of becoming a programme executive at this point in his career, feeling that for the time being he wanted to stay as a producer. "I would miss the sheer fun of it," he wrote later, "the thrilling danger of a live production; the exhilaration of seeing something come off ... live, on air." Thomas persisted, however, and Tesler, having been shown ABC's state-of-the-art new production studios at Teddington in west London accompanied by Thomas' further persuasive efforts, accepted and joined ABC in February 1960 to be in charge of everything ABC transmitted other than drama and outside broadcasts.

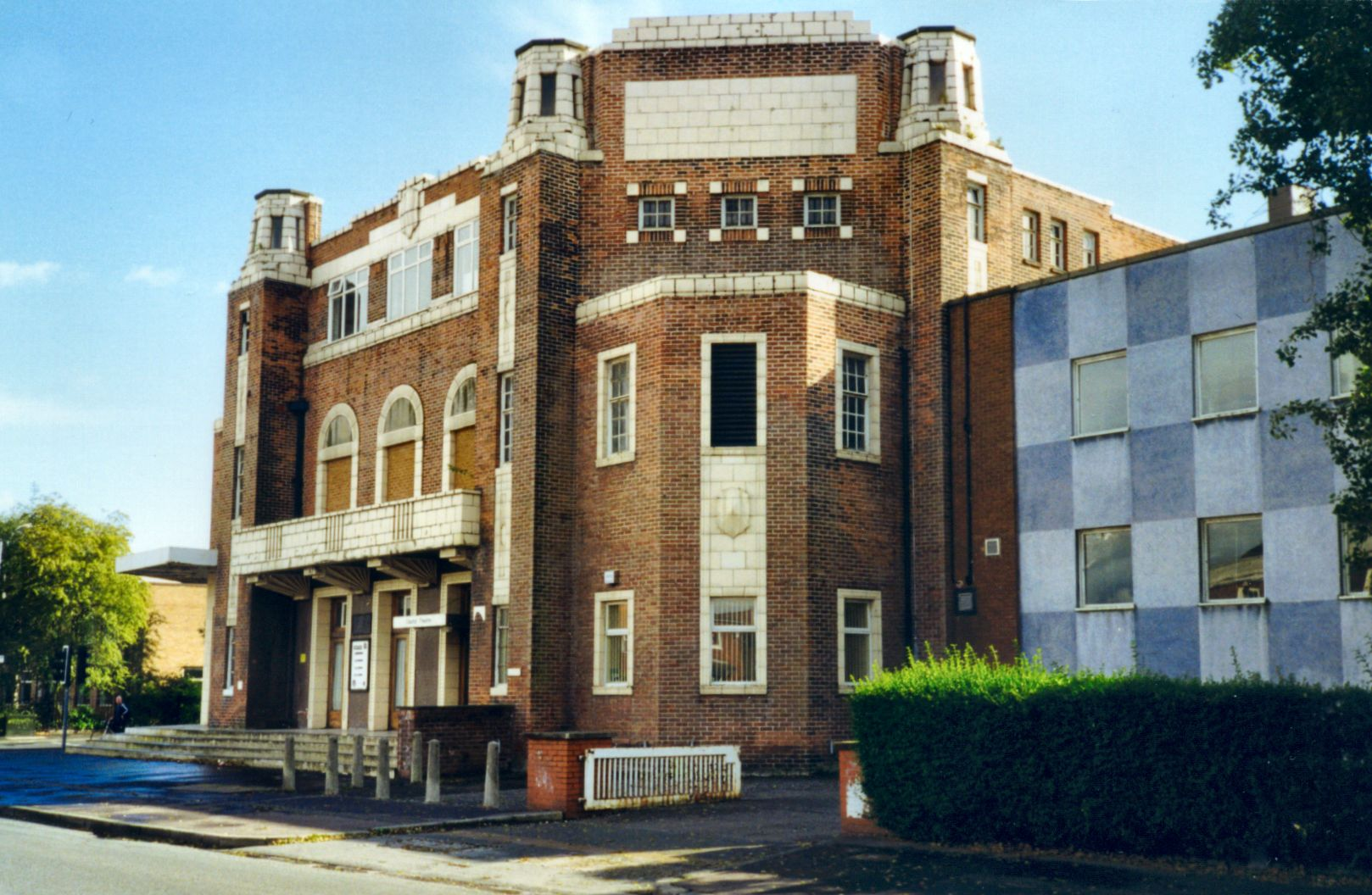
ABC Weekend TV studios in Didsbury, Manchester, disused and photographed prior to their demolition in 1998

Now controlling what was thought to be the only combined Light Entertainment and Features Department in television, Tesler needed to exercise executive responsibilities which were new to him and at the same time develop knowledge and expertise in features, an area of television in which he had not previously been involved. Disregarding his lack of experience he moved quickly to improve ABC's feature offerings, particularly in terms of the company's regional identity. He set up local news and current affairs operations at the studios at Didsbury in Manchester and Aston in Birmingham for programmes of local interest, ABC of the North and ABC of the Midlands, to be transmitted to their respective regions on Saturday evenings. Tesler also had at his disposal a large Outside Broadcast (OB) capability which enabled easy coverage of live light entertainment specials throughout the North and Midlands, morning worship from individual churches and a live farming programme from all over the ABC region.

At the end of his first year at ABC Tesler was able to write that the company had transmitted the first British television programme to be devoted solely to books and authors, The Book Man; a popular science programme with high ratings, You'd Never Believe It!; a teenage religious series, The Sunday Break; and an investigative religious series called Living Your Life.

As for the regional aspect of light entertainment in his first year at ABC, Tesler set up weekly outside broadcast live transmissions of adapted theatrical farces from many of the multiple repertory theatres throughout the Midlands and the North under the umbrella title of Comedy Matinee. And a musical show, Sing Along With Joe, featuring Joe "Mr Piano" Henderson, transmitted from a wide variety of factories throughout ABC's regions.

Tesler was also able to increase ABC's light entertainment contributions to the ITV network in 1960. Bob Monkhouse presented Candid Camera with the help of Jonathan Routh fooling the public with pranks from September 1960, Our House, a rare 60-minute situation comedy was launched and ran for 39 episodes, a pop and rock show Wham! began in April 1960, though it received poor reviews and a second series was cancelled. Steamboat Shuffle presented a wealth of traditional jazz acts and occasional folk singers on board a mocked up Mississippi riverboat moored on the Thames by ABC's Teddington Studios in the summer of 1960, and Tesler was able to sign up American dancer and singer Sammy Davis Jr to make his first British television appearance on ABC. Even though as an executive Tesler's producing days were supposed to be behind him, he could not resist taking on directing Sammy Davis Jr meets the British. Tesler vowed it would be his last production job but was tempted to produce one more programme, a Christmas show for 1960, Alice Through the Looking Box, featuring many of the biggest comedians, actors and personalities of the day. It won ITV's biggest audience on that Christmas Day.

During the ensuing seven-and-a-half years before the end of ABC's franchise in the North and Midlands, Tesler established a growing reputation as a production executive, particularly when in October 1962 he was promoted to be ABC's Programme Controller, in charge of the creation and presentation of all the company's output, and in 1964 when he was made Director of Programmes and elected to the Board of ABC Television, becoming the first ITV Programme Controller to be appointed to a Board.

ABC was the smallest of the so-called 'Big Four' ITV companies which were expected to make the programmes that would be networked over the whole country, but it was increasingly able to carry more production weight than its size suggested. Much of this was down to Tesler's personal reputation and his ability to attract a new school of producers, directors and writers. With them under contract it was easier to entice top performers and presenters to ABC.

Many of the programmes and series Tesler introduced at ABC became major network successes. Among them were the pop music show, Thank Your Lucky Stars, which lasted for five years from 1961; Big Night Out, which brought outside broadcast cameras to major entertainment events around the country and ran for five series from 1961 to 1965; Comedy Bandbox, which showed off new comedians like Jimmy Tarbuck, Mike Yarwood and Les Dawson; Opportunity Knocks, a talent show presented by Hughie Green, which became one of ITV's Top Twenty shows and ran for 14 years; and The Eamonn Andrews Show − Live from London! was produced from Teddington in 1964 and was British television's first late night chat show. It, too, appeared regularly in the Top Twenty TV ratings. After Sammy Davis Jr, American entertainers like Bing Crosby, Frank Sinatra and Peggy Lee made their first British TV specials for ABC. A successful new sitcom emerged in Never Mind the Quality, Feel the Width with Joe Lynch and John Bluthal. Blackpool Night Out from the resort's ABC Theatre, later became The Blackpool Show, hosted by Mike and Bernie Winters, Tony Hancock and Dickie Henderson. Tommy Cooper and Ken Dodd joined ABC for their own comedy shows on Saturday nights, and Bruce Forsyth starred in his own Sunday night ABC series.

Tesler ensured that sport dominated the network on Saturday afternoons with a new show, World of Sport, hosted by Eamonn Andrews, and supported by ABC's outside broadcast vehicles, at that time ITV's largest fleet. Culture was represented by an arts programme, Tempo, which was so successful it remained as ITV's only regular programme on the arts until 1968 and showed that ITV could be highbrow while remaining populist.

Network drama on ABC flourished with one-off plays continuing successfully in Sunday night's Armchair Theatre, and a number of popular drama series were sustained or emerged under Tesler's encouragement, such as espionage series The Avengers, Redcap about the military police, Public Eye, a crime and detection series, and action-drama spy series Callan.

In 1967 the Independent Television Authority (ITA) announced a rearrangement of franchises to start in 1968. This meant that there would no longer be a contract for ABC to reapply for. The Northern area, split into North West and Yorkshire, was to become a seven-day operation, as would the Midlands. Existing weekday contractors, Granada in the North West and ATV in the Midlands, were considered the favourites. ABC decided to submit two applications: one for the service for London weekends, the other for the Midlands seven-day operation, although it favoured the first contract.

It was expected that ABC would be awarded the London licence, but the strength of another application, from the London Weekend Television consortium, ruled this out. Since the Midlands seven-day franchise was to be taken by ATV, and the ITA had no desire that an operator with the reputation of ABC should lose out through no fault of its own, they ordered a merger between ABC and the existing London weekday company Rediffusion, with ABC having majority control, to become the weekday supplier for London, the prime ITV contract. The ITA also insisted that the Managing Director of the merged company should be ABC's Howard Thomas, and the Director of Programmes should be Brian Tesler, the only individuals named or specified in the 15 franchise awards, and "regarded as having the safest hands in the network".

The two companies became Thames Television. ABC ceased weekend broadcasting in the North and Midlands on Sunday 28 July 1968 and, with Rediffusion, and with Tesler as Director of Programmes, became the weekday supplier in the London region.

== Thames Television ==
The combined forces of the two contractors, ABC Weekend Television and Rediffusion, working under the new title of Thames Television, started transmission on 29 July 1968. Tesler, as Director of Programmes of the new company, was in the enviable position of being able to pick most of the best executives, programme makers and staff from the previous companies. From ABC came Philip Jones in charge of Light Entertainment and Lloyd Shirley running Drama. Tesler invited Rediffusion's Head of Features, Jeremy Isaacs, to join Thames as Controller of Features and Current Affairs with responsibility also for children's programmes, and also from Rediffusion came Grahame Turner as Head of Outside Broadcasts and Sport and Guthrie Moir took over Thames' Education and Religion.

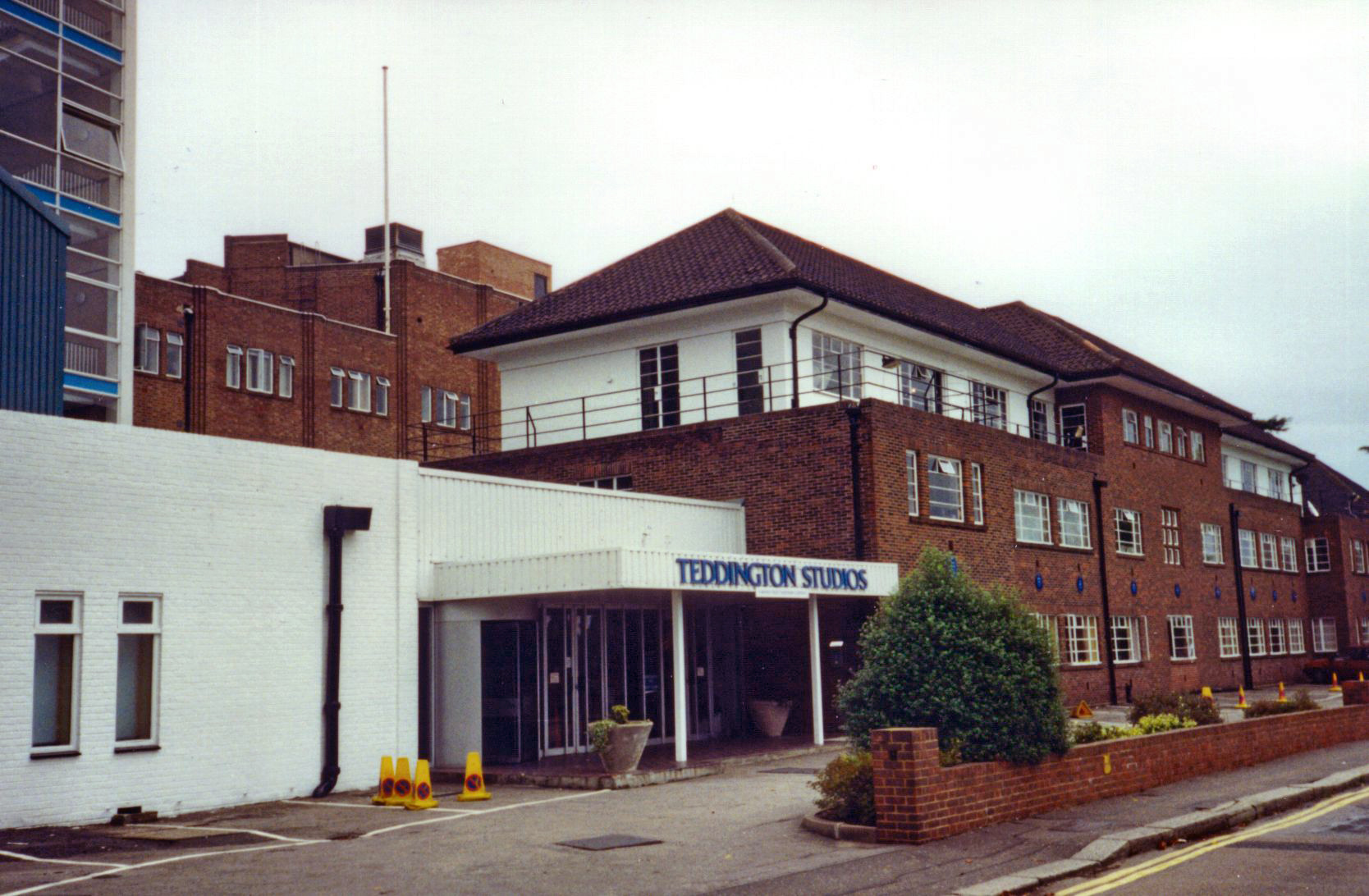
Thames Television studios in Teddington, London, photographed in 2006 after being relinquished by Thames TV and 10 years prior to their demolition

It was decided the main production centre for Thames' drama and light entertainment was to be ABC's studios in Teddington and, while using Rediffusion's central London studios to start with, Thames set about erecting a complex of offices with studios for features, news and presentation on Euston Road in central London. It opened in 1970 with four state-of-the-art studios, engineered for colour television, and greatly expanded Thames' production resources.

With staff and studios lined up, Tesler, now liberated from the tight confines of a two-day weekend, set about building a more expansive weekday schedule of programmes. A kingpin of the week was achieved when Jeremy Isaacs brought with him Rediffusion's highly regarded weekly current affairs programme This Week. A regular for each day was Eamonn Andrews who, no longer presenting his once a week chat show which it was felt would not sit well on a week night, became the anchor of a daily London news and current affairs programme in the early evening named Today. A major and much-publicised documentary series The Life and Times of Lord Mountbatten, about Earl Mountbatten of Burma, came to Thames from Rediffusion and Isaacs also supplied a varied run of many well-received documentaries. Persuading the Thames board to guarantee a large investment, in 1971 Tesler set up with Isaacs the production of a monumental 26-hour-long historical documentary series about the Second World War. The World at War first aired in October 1973 to large audiences and went on to win many awards and multiple foreign sales.

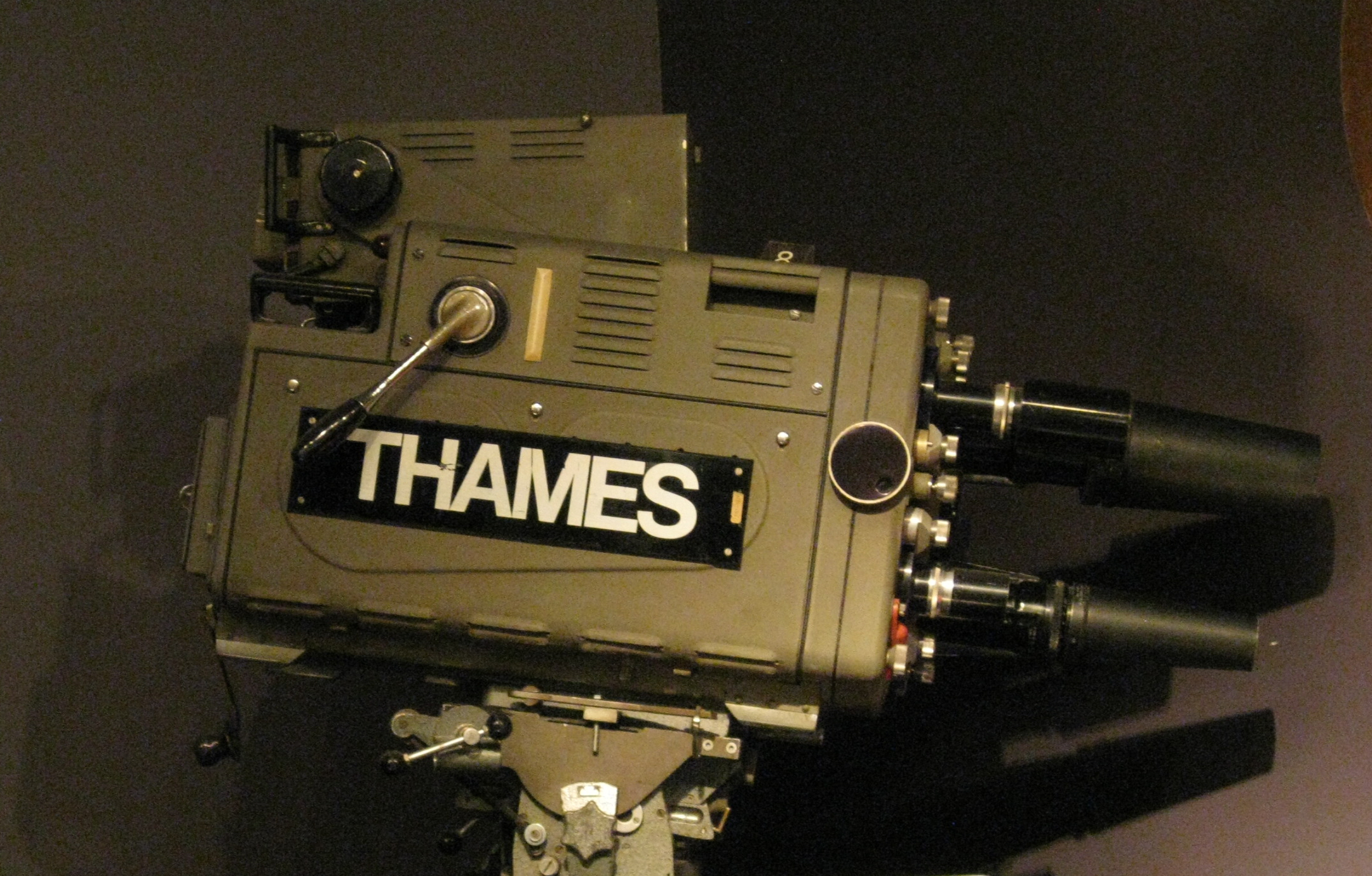
Thames TV Camera

In light entertainment, Tesler's ATV and ABC stable of big variety names came to work for him at Thames on major shows and situation comedies, joining top twenty winners like Opportunity Knocks and The Benny Hill Show. Multiple sitcoms on weekday nights began in Thames' early years and consolidated the company's supremacy on the ITV network. Among them were Father, Dear Father, the Sid James vehicle Bless This House, Love Thy Neighbour, with a controversial take on race relations, and Man About The House. The middle of the week was boosted when Tesler acquired the rights to This Is Your Life, which the BBC had allowed to lapse. Its original presenter, Eamonn Andrews, brought it back successfully in a long run of many years on Wednesday nights, beginning in the first few days of colour transmission on ITV in London in November 1969.

Excellent ratings, critical praise and awards both domestic and international were quickly earned by the drama department with long-running series such as Public Eye with Alfred Burke and Van der Valk with Barry Foster, mini-series like Jenny, Lady Randolph Churchill with Lee Remick and single dramas under the Armchair Theatre title. Drama was also the home for a radical move in television, crucially approved by Tesler, where rather than being studio bound, plays could be shot on location using 16mm film. Euston Films was set up in 1971 under whose umbrella major drama series like The Sweeney and Minder could be liberated into a whole new territory, a system quickly copied by other drama departments around the network and at the BBC.

Education benefitted from the setting up of Thames Television. Rediffusion had been a pioneer of broadcasting for schools and ABC of adult education with both being ahead of the BBC. Tesler encouraged Guthrie Moir to press ahead at Thames with multiple education programmes for children and adults and Moir introduced a puppet show for smaller children, Rainbow, which ran for many years and won Best Children's Programme in 1975. Outside of education Tesler ensured a healthy supply of children's programmes, including Sooty (featuring a teddy bear hand puppet) which had been dropped by the BBC after running there since 1952. Action and adventure drama series for youngsters went out in large numbers in late afternoon or early evening. Thames came up with a belated successful competitor for the BBC's long-running Blue Peter magazine programme for children. Magpie ran from 1968 to 1980.

Tesler also ensured Thames' Outside Broadcast (OB) department, which inherited much of ABC's OB facilities, was kept busy with coverage of many London-based activities, including royal and state occasions, show business galas, award shows, as well as light entertainment, consumer programmes, location video recording for drama, and weekday sporting events in London.

Halfway through the 10-year franchise period, in 1974, the Independent Broadcasting Authority awarded Thames high marks for all-round competence and reliability. Tesler later reported: "We had won more national and international awards than any other ITV company. Our revenue from advertising was higher than any other ... and (we) earned consistently high overall ratings."

At the end of 1973, Tesler's contract as Thames' Director of Programmes was to expire, but his intention was to remain with the company on a new contract. Early in December, Thames' Managing Director Howard Thomas informed Tesler that he, Thomas, was to become Chairman of the company and proposed that Tesler should become Managing Director in his place. Tesler was delighted and accepted, but the promotion was blocked when Thames' largest shareholder, Thorn EMI, insisted Tesler become a direct employee of Thames. Previously he had been employed through his own private company, Multithon. Tesler refused to give way and as a result lost the promotion.

Astonished by what he considered to be "an asinine miscalculation" by Thames TV, and sensing an opportunity, the Chairman and Managing Director of London Weekend Television, John Freeman, approached Tesler and offered him the position of Deputy Managing Director of LWT with the promise of becoming Chief Executive when, in two years' time, Freeman was to stand down. Tesler, hurt by Thames' attitude over his succession and having not yet been awarded a renewed Director of Programmes contract from the company, felt he owed neither moral nor financial loyalty to Thames Television, so accepted Freeman's offer and resigned from Thames with three months' notice.

He later wrote that he was very much aware that in resigning from Thames at the age of 45 he was "saying farewell to more than twenty years of personal involvement with programmes and programme-making and hadn't the faintest idea of what might await me in my new career."

== London Weekend Television ==
Tesler joined London Weekend Television (LWT) as Deputy Managing Director in May 1974. Not everyone there welcomed him warmly. He had come from Thames Television, the so-called "rival", and LWT's Controller of Programmes, Cyril Bennett, was unhappy about being passed over for the post Tesler had taken. Many of the senior programme staff, and particularly those who owed their positions to Bennett, felt he had been treated badly and were "deeply resentful". Despite this, David Docherty, in his history of the first 21 years of LWT, reports that "through the next two years ... the new man bedded down and established himself with the Board, the programme-makers and the technical staff."

Unlike Thames Television, LWT had had a shaky start to its franchise in 1968. Financial problems, changes of shareholders, resignations of some senior executives, union difficulties, press hostility and some poor programming had led the Independent Broadcasting Authority to consider removing LWT's contract altogether. However, the appointment of John Freeman as Managing Director and Chairman and Cyril Bennett as Controller of Programmes in 1971 had improved the outlook for the station. By the time Tesler arrived in 1974 LWT Drama had been doing well with series and one-off plays. Light entertainment had been enlivening the network's Saturday evenings with both new and long-running situation comedies, together with music and comedy spectaculars. Sport and Current Affairs were the equal of ITV's other similar programming. LWT's programme achievements had been recognised by seven British Academy of Film and Television Arts BAFTA Awards, including recognition for its arts programme Aquarius and for The Stanley Baxter Picture Show which won four of the awards.

But the mid-term review by the IBA in 1974 was scathing about LWT's religion and adult education and its children's fare. Drama, it said, was "uneven", scheduling "lacked skill", presentation was "weak" and local programming was considered "inadequate". By 1976 ITV's revenue was becoming depressed and the BBC was winning viewers. LWT's Deputy Programme Controller (Current Affairs), John Birt, later recorded that by 1976 the company "seemed to be in the doldrums, and ITV's weekend schedules - compared with the BBC's - appeared dull". The IBA was also concerned that LWT was backsliding on its public service responsibilities. In his first two years at LWT as Deputy Managing Director Tesler had observed what he termed a "deceleration" of the company's creative drive.

In June 1976 Tesler reached the pinnacle of his television career when he became Chief Executive of LWT. He wanted to mark this achievement by developing new ideas and expansion in the programme division. He felt that what was urgently required to improve LWT's performance was a creative conference of the company's programme makers so that they "could get to know each other, exchange ideas, share problems, develop a sense of solidarity." The three-day conference in November 1976 was a marked success. LWT's Deputy Controller of Programmes (Entertainment), Michael Grade, later wrote that "Brian Tesler ... chaired the conference brilliantly. In his closing speech he was clear-eyed about LWT's failures but hopeful enough about its future prospects ..." Tesler wrote later that "the spirit of camaraderie and cooperation aroused by the conference, the cross-fertilisation it had engendered, and the creative and coordinating committees it had given birth to, would galvanise LWT's programme department into excellence again."

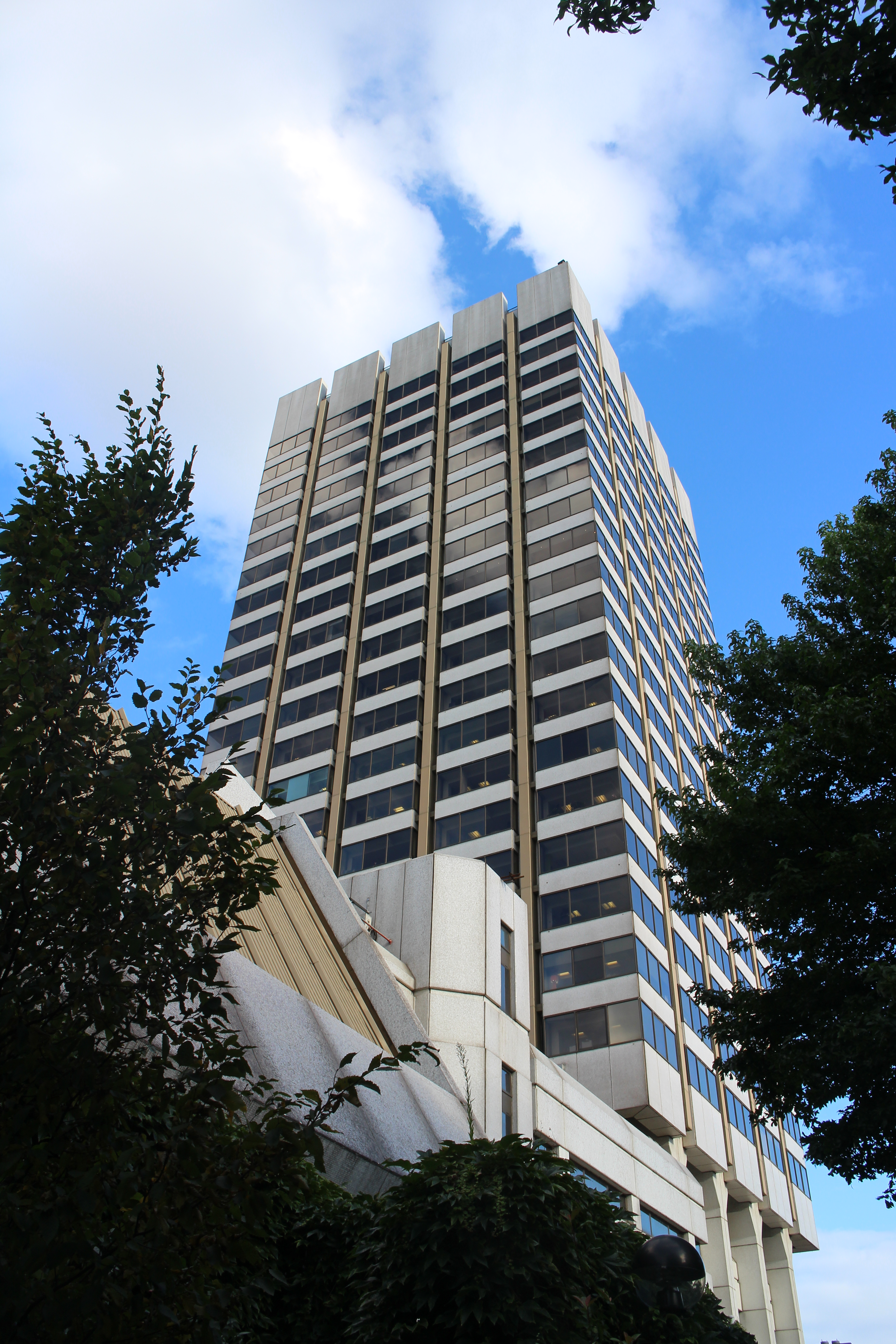
London Weekend Television offices and studios photographed in 2016, nine years before their demolition

The excitement brought into being by the conference was dashed however, by the death immediately afterwards of the Programme Controller, Cyril Bennett, compounded by an initial fear that his death might have been suicide. The grief among the programme staff was widespread. Tesler recognised that it was his responsibility to help the company emerge from this shock. He took over as Programme Controller for three months until a new appointment could be made. He set up a Creative Committee of programme heads to plan shows, discuss programme schedules, share ideas and sort out problems, and used his position as chairman of the Committee to assess the qualities of each of the heads to decide which of them should take over as Programme Controller. In February 1977 Tesler appointed Michael Grade as Director of Programmes. The creative energy sparked by the conference but dulled by Bennett's death was now unleashed. "LWT started to reinvent itself," wrote ITV historian Paul Bonner. "Under Brian Tesler's Managing Directorship LWT was to become the success for which its founders (almost all of whom had by that time left the company) had so earnestly striven."

The "reinvention" of LWT from the beginning of 1977 was a remarkable turnaround. Tesler's pride in this achievement was tempered by his sadness that he was no longer involved in programme making. In writing of his years in television in The Best of Times, published in 2016, he was honest about his regret:

"The achievement only peripherally involved me. I encouraged it, approved it, persuaded the Board to fund it, tweaked it a little in my weekly sessions with Michael Grade, made a suggestion here, a recommendation there, offered guidance and advice when it was sought, but I had to reconcile myself to the fact that I had finally said goodbye to any significant personal involvement in programme making. For the first time in more than 20 years I was not a Producer, a Controller or a Director of Programmes."

In 1982 Tesler was appointed Deputy Chairman of LWT in addition to his Chief Executive post and on 1 February 1984, when John Freeman retired, Tesler became LWT Chairman while retaining his position as Managing Director.

In his time as Chief Executive Tesler faced multiple challenges and activities of a type which he never had to deal with as a programme maker. An eleven-week strike by television unions in 1979 which resulted in a loss of income from advertising and three months' loss of production, the resignation of two Directors of Programmes at crucial moments, a recession and ensuing radical cost-cutting and job losses in the 1980s, and jail threats and large fines for Tesler and LWT when programme content placed them in serious contempt of court were among the worst of Tesler's problems. Meeting and greeting the Queen and other members of the Royal Family and introducing them to performers when hosting royal galas transmitted by LWT, winning a renewed franchise to broadcast at the weekends in London in 1982, bringing a more balanced schedule of programmes into being as LWT moved back into a commanding position when financial matters improved in the late 1980s, being honoured as a Commander of the Most Excellent Order of the British Empire (CBE) for services to television in 1986, and LWT winning more BAFTA and Prix Italia Awards than any other ITV company and more Montreux Rose d'Or Awards than the BBC were among the pleasanter aspects of his job.

In February 1990, on becoming 61, Tesler stood down as Chief Executive of LWT, but retained his position as Chairman of the LWT television company and continued to chair LWT's Programme Advisory Board. He subsequently became Deputy Chairman of LWT's parent company, LWT (Holdings), and chairman of three of the company's divisions: LWT Programmes, London Weekend Television International and The London Studios.

Tesler was consequently heavily involved with LWT's application for a further renewal of its franchise on 1 January 1993. A potentially lucrative management incentive share scheme was introduced in an attempt to retain and motivate senior LWT managers who might otherwise be persuaded to join competitors for the franchise. 54 executives, including Tesler, invested in the scheme in 1989 at 83 pence a share in the hope of benefitting considerably if LWT was to win a new franchise. Two years later LWT was successful and its shares rose considerably. The scheme matured in June 1993 and produced great financial benefits for those involved. Tesler's investment returned £6,870,000. On 31 August 1993, he sold some of his shares on the first day possible, for £375,000. He also contributed £200,000 to a payout to staff who had not been able to take part in the "golden handcuff" scheme. The news that LWT managers had benefited so greatly was met with much press criticism. It was suggested the rewards were out of proportion to the risks the managers had run. Tesler was mentioned, along with other LWT executives, in an early day motion in the House of Commons signed by 65 MPs condemning the share scheme and deploring what it called a "crass personal lust for money".

In June 1993, at the same time as Tesler and the other investors in the scheme were profiting, Granada Television, the ITV company which held the franchise for the north west of England, began to buy LWT shares. In December 1993 they made a hostile bid for the company. The following February Granada succeeded in a takeover of LWT, which now became part of the Granada Group. Tesler, as an LWT shareholder, refused to accept Granada's offer and, resigning from the Board, sold 631,000 shares - about half his stake in the company - for £4,500,000.

Tesler retired from LWT and all his television activities on his 65th birthday on 19 February 1994.

== Other media activities ==
As well as his mainstream work within broadcasting, Tesler occupied a number of related posts during his career.

In 1974 Tesler became a member of the board of management of the Services Sound and Vision Corporation which was formally the British Forces Broadcasting Service (with whom he had worked in Trieste during his time in the army).

In 1975 Tesler was nominated as ITV's representative on the Prime Minister's working party on the Future of the British Film Industry. He remained as the representative when the working party was succeeded by the Interim Action Committee on the Film Industry and again in 1985 when it became the British Screen Advisory Council. Tesler remained on the council until his retirement in 1994.

From 1979 until his retirement he was also ITV's representative as a governor of the National Film and Television School, and as a governor of the British Film Institute, for the last three years as deputy chairman.

1980 saw Tesler appointed chairman of the Independent Television Contractors Association, a position he held for two years.

Tesler was also the representative of London Weekend Television on the board of Independent Television News, a post he relinquished in 1976.

In 1980, as a senior ITV executive, Tesler joined the panel of consultants appointed by the IBA to set up the new independent television channel, Channel 4, becoming a member when the Channel 4 board was constituted. He completed his five-year term on the Board in 1985.

In 1985 Tesler was appointed chairman of Super Channel, a satellite broadcasting operation beaming a pick of programmes from ITV, Channel 4 and the BBC into the European mainland for 18 hours a day. It began transmitting in January 1987 to 9 million viewers in 14 countries served by cable stations. The project failed to make money and when in May 1988 LWT Holdings refused to contribute any further finance, Tesler felt it appropriate to resign as chairman.

Tesler was president of the Television and Radio Industries Club (TRIC) in 1979-80 and was one of its six companions.

In 2000 Tesler was elected a member of the Hall of Fame of the Royal Television Society.

== Lord Chancellor's Department ==
In January 1991, while still working for London Weekend Television, Tesler was appointed on a voluntary basis to the Lord Chancellor's Committee for Inner London, part of the Chancellor's Advisory Committee on Justices of the Peace, based at Southwark Crown Court. The Committee's function was to interview prospective candidates for the post of Magistrate and make recommendations to the Lord Chancellor. In December 1993 he was appointed Chairman of the Committee.

When his tenure as Chairman ended in 1996 Tesler was asked to serve as a lay interviewer for the Judicial Appointments Commission to examine prospective Assistant Recorders, Acting Stipendiary Magistrates, Presidents of Industrial Tribunals and Circuit and District Judges.

Tesler additionally was invited by the Office of the Commissioner for Public Appointments to serve as an Independent Assessor, working for the Home Office in the search for a head of the Boundary Commission of England, and for the National Health Service in appointing Non-Executive Directors for primary care trusts. The statutory end for these voluntary activities is the age of 70, but Tesler bypassed the law and finally retired as an interviewer and assessor in 2010 at the age of 81.

== Personal life ==
Tesler married Audrey Maclean on 28 October 1959. She had been his production assistant at Associated Television for the previous two years. She told the Daily Mirror: "I came to work for Brian while his regular assistant was away on holiday. Somehow I stayed."

They set up home in Chiswick in West London and had a son, Simon.

When Tesler retired in 1994 he and his wife set up a small charity, The Multithon Trust, which supports the treatment of and research into the causes of illness, disease and disability, and the care and welfare of those who suffer from them.

Audrey Tesler died of cancer in 2008, three weeks before their Golden Wedding.

Tesler wrote two books about his life and career. The first, Before I Forget, was published in 2006, and described his young life, growing up in a Jewish family in London before and during the Second World War. He recalled in some detail his childhood introduction to music hall and radio entertainment, and about his later experience with the British Forces Broadcasting Service during his Army service. The second book, The Best Of Times, published in 2016, is an in-depth account of his professional career as a producer of light entertainment in the 1950s and 1960s and then as a senior executive in independent television from the 1970s until 1994.

Tesler died after a short illness on 30 October 2024, at the age of 95. A small Jewish family funeral was held at Golders Green Crematorium on 06 November 2024.
