= Guess My Story =

Guess My Story may refer to:

- Guess My Story (Canadian TV series), 1954
- Guess My Story (British TV series), 1953-1955
