= Eunice Gayson =

English actress (1928–2018)

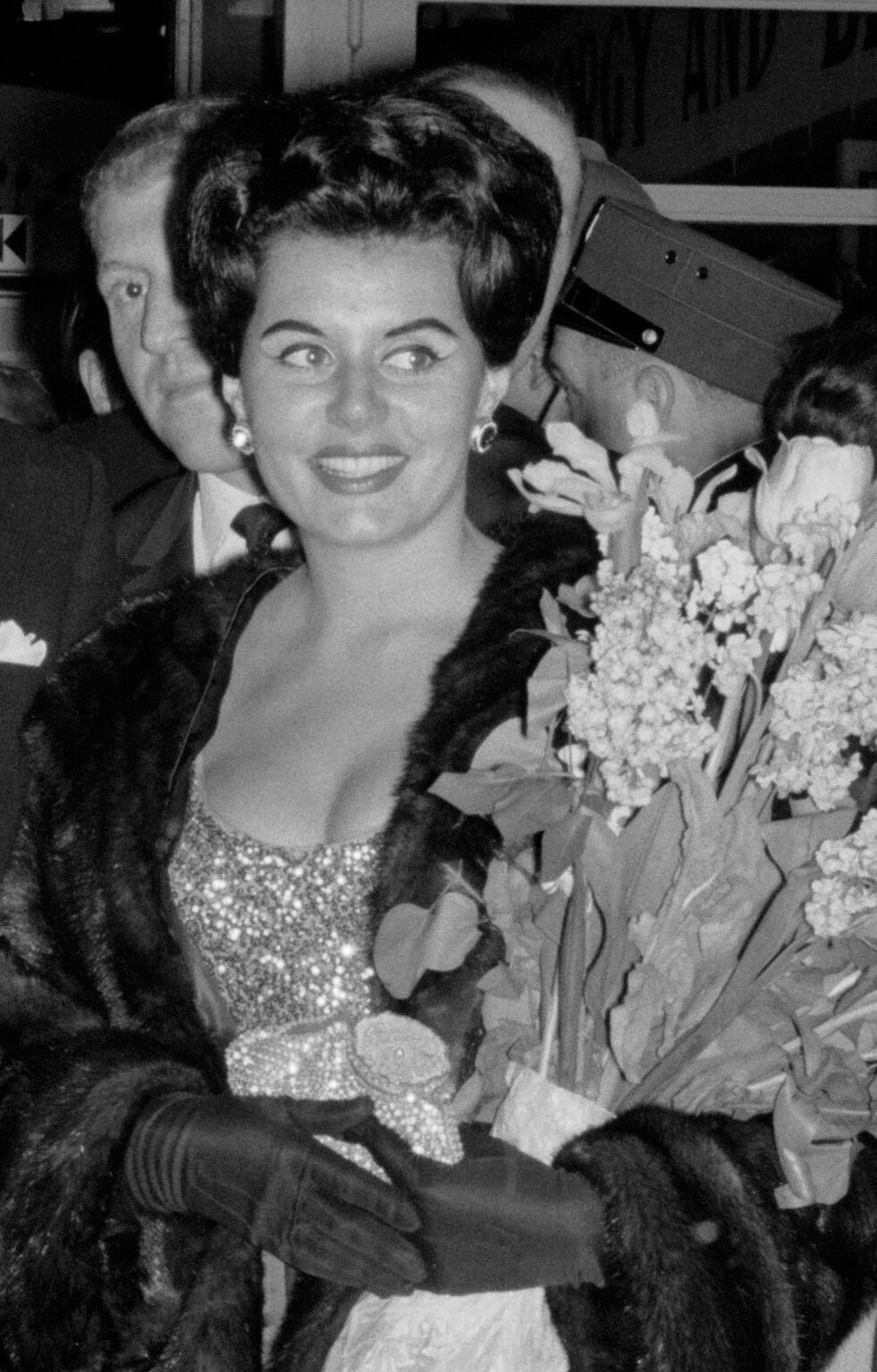
- Gayson in 1960
- Born: Eunice Elizabeth Sargaison; 17 March 1928; Streatham, London, England
- Died: 8 June 2018 (aged 90); London, England
- Education: Edinburgh Academy
- Occupation: Actress
- Years active: 1948–2018
- Notable credit(s): Bond girl Sylvia Trench in Dr. No and From Russia with Love
- Spouse(s): Leigh Vance (m. 1953; div. 1959) Brian Jackson (m. 1968; div. 1977)
- Children: 1

Eunice Elizabeth Sargaison (17 March 1928 – 8 June 2018), known professionally as Eunice Gayson, was an English actress best known for playing Sylvia Trench, James Bond's love interest in the first two Bond films (Dr. No and From Russia with Love) and is thus considered to have been the first "Bond girl".

== Early life ==
Gayson and her twin sister Patricia were born in 1928 in Croydon to John and Maria Sargaison (née Gammon). Her father was a civil servant. The family lived in Streatham, London and moved to Purley, Surrey and later Glasgow, before settling in Edinburgh. There she attended the Edinburgh Academy and studied operatic singing.

== Career ==
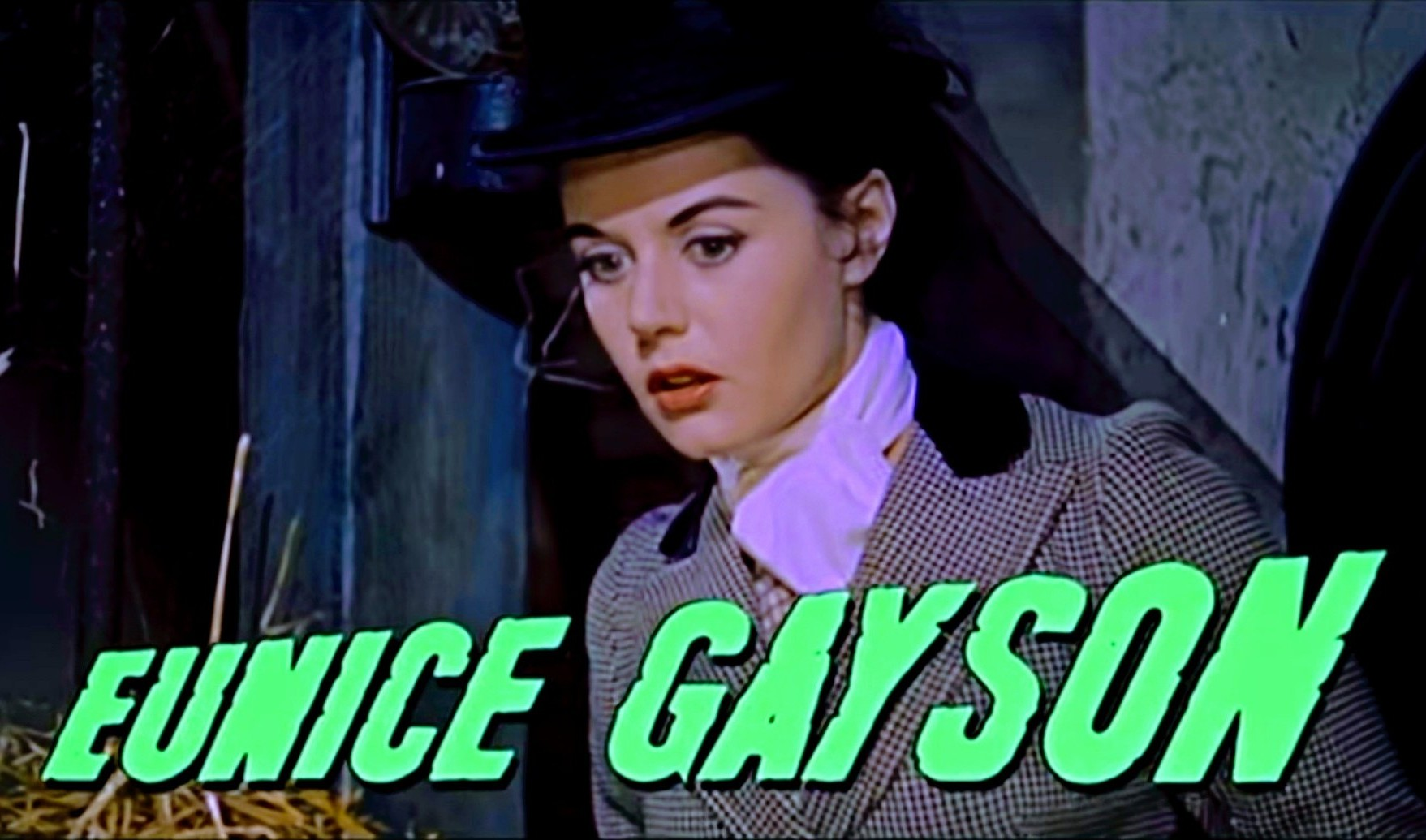
Gayson as Margaret in The Revenge of Frankenstein

Gayson played a major role in the Hammer horror film The Revenge of Frankenstein and appeared on television in series such as The Saint (which starred a future James Bond, Roger Moore) and The Avengers. She played the Baroness Elsa Schraeder in the 1962 London stage production of The Sound of Music, during which time she also filmed scenes for the first two Bond films, Dr. No (1962) and From Russia with Love (1963). She remained a regular in London theatre, appearing in, among other productions, the comedy The Grass Is Greener (1971). In the early 1990s, Gayson appeared in Stephen Sondheim's Into the Woods in the role of the grandmother.

=== Bond films ===
In the first two James Bond films, Dr. No and From Russia with Love, Gayson played James Bond's love interest in London, Sylvia Trench. In early scenes, Bond attempts to set up a liaison with her but gets called away on a mission before anything serious can develop. This was intended to be a running motif in multiple films, but the character was dropped after the second film. The character is responsible for Bond's iconic introductory catchphrase, "Bond, James Bond"; when Trench introduces herself to Bond as "Trench, Sylvia Trench" during a game of chemin de fer in Dr. No, Bond replies in kind, mimicking Trench's own cadence, after she inquires of him "Mister..?"

Gayson had initially been cast in Dr. No as Miss Moneypenny, M's secretary, while the actress who played Moneypenny, Lois Maxwell, had been cast as Sylvia Trench. However, Maxwell found the Trench character too immodest, and their roles were switched. Gayson is therefore considered the first "Bond girl."

== Personal life ==
Gayson married the writer Leigh Vance in 1953, a marriage that was featured on the American daytime television series Bride and Groom. They divorced in 1959, and in 1968 she married the film and stage actor Brian Jackson. She and Jackson had a daughter before divorcing after ten years of marriage. Their daughter Kate later appeared in the casino scene in the 1995 Bond film GoldenEye. Gayson died on 8 June 2018, aged 90.

== Filmography ==
=== Film ===
Year	Title	Role	Notes
1948	My Brother Jonathan	A Young Girl	
1948	It Happened in Soho	Julie	
1949	The Huggetts Abroad	Peggy	Uncredited
1949	Melody in the Dark	Pat Evans	
1950	Dance Hall	Mona	
1951	To Have and to Hold	Peggy Harding	
1952	Down Among the Z Men	Officer's Wife	Uncredited
1952	Miss Robin Hood	Pam	
1953	Street Corner	Janet	Uncredited
1954	Dance Little Lady	Adele	
1954	One Just Man		
1955	Out of the Clouds	Penny Henson	
1956	The Last Man to Hang	Elizabeth Anders	
1956	Zarak	Cathy Ingram	
1957	Carry On Admiral	Jane Godfrey	
1957	Light Fingers	Rose Levenham	
1958	The Revenge of Frankenstein	Margaret	
1958	Hello London	Herself	Documentary
1962	Dr. No	Sylvia Trench	
1963	From Russia with Love	Sylvia Trench	

=== Television ===
Year	Title	Role	Notes
1948	Between Ourselves		Television film
1948	Halesapoppin!		Television film
1948	Lady Luck	Faith	Television film
1949	Pink String and Sealing Wax	Emily Strachan	Television film
1949	The Director	Katie	Television film
1949	Dick Whittington	Alice	Television film
1950	Here Come the Boys		1 Episode
1950	Treasures in Heaven	Carol Benson	Television film
1950	Mother of Men	Jennie	Television film
1953	Guess My Story	Self – Panelist	
1954	The Vise	Julia Benton	Episode: "Death Pays No Dividends"
1959	Juke Box Jury	Self – Panelist	1 episode
1960	What's My Line?	Self – Guest Panelist	Episode: "George Jessel (2)"
1964	Danger Man	Louise Bancroft	Episode: "A Man to Be Trusted"
1964–1965	The Saint	Nora Prescott; Christine Graner	Episode: "The Invisible Millionaire"; Episode: "The Saint Bids Diamonds"
1966	The Avengers	Lucille Banks	Episode: "Quick-Quick slow Death"
1967	Before the Fringe		2 episodes
1967	The Dick Emery Show		1 episode
1967	Further Adventures of Lucky Jim		Episode: "Jim Cleans Up"
1967	The Reluctant Romeo	Gina Darletti	Episode: "What's in a Name"
1968	The World of Beachcomber		
1970	Albert and Victoria	Madame Aix	Episode: "The Gothic Church"; Episode: "Lovers' Quarrel"
1970	Turkey Time	Louis Stoatt	Television film
1972	The Adventurer	Countess Marie	Episode: "Thrust and Counter-Thrust"
2012	This Morning	Self	1 episode
2013	The Playboy Morning Show	Self	1 episode
