= Alexander Walker (critic) =

British film critic and writer (1930–2003)

Alexander Walker (23 March 1930 – 15 July 2003) was a British film critic who wrote for the London Evening Standard from 1960 to the end of his life. He wrote 20 books.

== Life and career ==
Walker was born in Portadown, County Armagh in Northern Ireland, the only son of Alfred, a commercial traveller, and Ethel Walker. He was educated at Portadown Grammar School, Queen's University, Belfast, the College of Europe in Bruges, Belgium and the University of Michigan, where he lectured in political philosophy for two years from 1952.

He worked for the Birmingham Post from 1953, where he was noticed by Godfrey Winn, who became a significant influence upon him as well as, later, Lord Beaverbrook and Lord Rothermere. The film critic of the London Evening Standard from 1960, he remained in the role until his death in 2003. His most extended work was a book trilogy on the history of the British film industry: Hollywood England, National Heroes and Icons in the Fire. In addition, he was the author of an Elizabeth Taylor biography, a history of the impact made on Hollywood by the rise of the talkies (The Shattered Silents) and a study of the work of Stanley Kubrick.

Walker assembled a collection of more than 200 drawings and prints by modern artists, which were bequeathed to the British Museum after his death in 2003. In 1968, he was a member of the jury at the 18th Berlin International Film Festival.

Walker was a frequent broadcaster on radio and television on the arts. He authored the television series Moviemen and the BBC Radio series Film Star. He was the author and co-producer of television programmes on the history of Hollywood, Greta Garbo, and Charlie Chaplin. Walker was a member of the British Screen Advisory Council (formerly the Wilson Interim Action Committee on the Film Industry) from 1977 to 1992 and of the Board of Governors at the British Film Institute from 1989 to 1995.

Walker was critical of the films Nothing Personal and Some Mother's Son, both which are set during the Troubles in Northern Ireland. He claimed that ""the Ulster people are not represented in the film at all and the English are represented as either public school brutes or fruity-voiced wimps", and said that there was "undoubtedly an element of propaganda in these films... When they are shown abroad, the people who make the films and the people from the Irish Film Board who attend make speeches. In essence, what they are doing is giving their support to something which is anti-British". Rod Stoneman, who was chief executive of the Irish Film Board at the time, rejected Walker's criticism, and pointed out that, of the 23 Irish films which the board had assisted since its relaunch in 1993, only four had touched upon the Troubles.

=== Ken Russell ===
Walker had a close relationship with Kubrick, but was a fierce critic of the British director Ken Russell, referring to the director's visceral The Devils (1971) as being "a garish glossary of sado-masochism … a taste for visual sensation that makes scene after scene look like the masturbatory fantasies of a Roman Catholic boyhood." Having previously been a defender of Russell's early work for the BBC he was increasingly critical of Russell films of the 1970s. Reviewing The Music Lovers (1970) he wrote: "This man must be stopped: bring me an elephant gun." In a television showdown between the two men in response to Walker's assessment of The Devils as "monstrously indecent", Russell reached over and hit him around the head with a rolled up newspaper copy of his own review. In later life, when asked about the incident and if he regretted it, Russell responded that he did regret it: "I wish it had been an iron bar."

== Honours ==
In 1970, 1974, and 1998, Walker was named Critic of the Year at the annual British Press awards, also being commended in 1985. He was made a Chevalier de l'ordre des Arts et des Lettres in 1981, and won the Golden Eagle Award in the Philippines for services to international cinema in 1982.

== Personal life and death ==
Walker died in July 2003, aged 73. He listed his recreations in Who's Who as "ski-ing and persecuting smokers". He lived at 1 Marlborough, a block of flats at 38-40 Maida Vale in the area of the same name.

== Books ==
- Double Takes - notes and afterthoughts on the movies 1956-1976, Elm Tree Books 1977
- His history of British film:
  - Hollywood England – The British Film Industry in the 1960s: Harrop 1974
  - National Heroes – British Cinema in the 70s and 80s, London: Harrop 1985
  - Icons in the Fire – the decline and fall of almost everybody in the British film industry 1984-2000, London, Orion Books 2004
- Stanley Kubrick - Director, Norton 1999
- Audrey - her real story, St. Martin's Press 1995
- Bette Davis – a celebration, New York: Applause Theatre Books, 1998
- Dietrich, New York: Harper and Row 1984
- The Celluloid Sacrifice – aspects of sex in the movies, London: Joseph 1966
- Elizabeth - The Life of Elizabeth Taylor, Weidenfeld 1991
- Garbo - A portrait, Macmillan 1980
- Fatal Charm – The Life of Rex Harrison, St. Martin's Press 1993
- Joan Crawford - the ultimate star, Harper and Row 1983
- It's only a movie, Ingrid – encounters on and off the screen, London, Headline 1988
- Peter Sellers - the authorized biography, Weidenfeld and Nicolson 1981
- Vivien - The life of Vivien Leigh, Weidenfeld and Nicolson 1987
- Rudolph Valentino, Stein and Day 1976
- Shattered Silents - how the talkies came to stay, London: Elm Tree Books 1978, New York: Morrow Quill Paperbacks, 1980
- Stanley Kubrick directs, New York: Harcourt, Brace, Jovanovich 1972
- Stardom - the Hollywood phenomenon, Stein and Day 1970
- No Bells on Sunday: the Journals of Rachel Roberts (editor), London: Pavilion Books, 1984; New York, Harper & Row 1984
