= John Terry (film financier) =

Sir John Elliott Terry (11 June 1913 – 29 March 1995) was a British film financier and lawyer who helped to found the National Film School and served as manager of the National Film Finance Corporation (NFFC) for over 20 years.

He worked as a solicitor for the National Film Finance Corporation from 1949 to 1956, served as its secretary from 1956 to 1958, and was managing director from 1958 to 1978. During his time with the NNFC he supported hundreds of films and helped launch the careers of many well known directors, including Karel Reisz, Ken Loach, Ridley Scott and David Puttnam.

In 1970, he was one of several people who helped to establish the National Film School and served as its governor until 1981. He was governor of the London International Film School from 1982 to 1990, and a governor of the Royal National College for the Blind in Hereford between 1980 and 1985.

In 1975, he chaired Harold Wilson's Working Party on the Future of the British Film Industry, and later became Deputy Chairman of the Interim Action Committee on the Film Industry which was set up as a result of the report he had helped to compile. When the Government disbanded that committee, Terry, together with John Chittock and Michael Deeley, established the British Screen Advisory Council, of which he was made honorary vice-president in 1993.

He was knighted for his services to the film industry in 1976.

He served as a firefighter in World War II and was badly injured in the incident which saw Harry Errington awarded the George Cross.

== Personal life ==
Terry married Joan Fell in 1940. The couple had two children - a son and a daughter.
