= BSAC =

BSAC can stand for:

- The British Screen Advisory Council
- Bit Sliced Arithmetic Coding, audio coding from MPEG-4 Part 3
- British South Africa Company, 1889–1965
- British Sub-Aqua Club
- British Society for Antimicrobial Chemotherapy
- Black Swamp Area Council, scouting organisation in Ohio
- Benedictine Study and Arts Centre, Ealing, London
