= Happy Landing (1938 film) =

1938 American musical comedy film

- Directed by: Roy Del Ruth
- Written by: Boris Ingster
- Produced by: Darryl F. Zanuck; David Hempstead
- Starring: Sonja Henie; Don Ameche; Jean Hersholt; Cesar Romero
- Music by: David Buttolph; Cyril J. Mockridge; Ernst Toch
- Production company: 20th Century Fox
- Distributed by: 20th Century Fox
- Release date: January 28, 1938
- Running time: 102 minutes
- Country: United States
- Language: English

Happy Landing is a 1938 American musical comedy film directed by Roy Del Ruth, starring Sonja Henie, Ethel Merman, Don Ameche and Cesar Romero.

== Plot ==
A bandleader, Duke Sargent, and his manager Jimmy Hall are flying from New York to Paris when they must make a forced landing in Norway. A misunderstanding results in local girl Trudy Ericksen being romantically committed to Duke, but he has Flo Kelly waiting for him back in New York and slips away.

Trudy follows him to New York, but ends up in Central Park on a skating date with Jimmy and soon is signed up as the star of a big-city ice revue.

== Cast ==
- Sonja Henie as Trudy
- Cesar Romero as Duke
- Don Ameche as Jimmy
- Ethel Merman as Flo
- Billy Gilbert as Counter Man
- Raymond Scott as Leader of Quintet
- Wally Vernon as Al
- Leah Ray as Specialty Singer

== Production ==
In November 1937 while shooting the film Henie was injured when her skate crossed on some cotton on the ice. She soon recovered and returned to work in a week.

The production numbers involved 84 skaters under dance director Henry Losee. It was difficult finding skaters who could dance and dancers who could skate so he ended up employing half dancers and half skaters and they would teach each other. Henie later took 60 of the skaters with her on tour after making the movie.

== Reception ==
The Los Angeles Times called it her best picture to date. The New York Times praised the "ingenious script" and "engaging support players" saying the film "has pace, humour, spectacle and a pleasant if minor score." Filmink called it "great fun. Very strong cast."

== Follow Up ==
Daryl F. Zanuck was so pleased with the film he optioned Henie to make three more. However shortly after the film came out Henie said she was getting sick of movie work saying "I can't stand the strain - working from early morning to seven or eight at night and I do not intend to do so. I train hard and can keep going at top speed with anybody but not as much as movies demand." When Zanuck heard this he said "this is all news to me." However she went on to make My Lucky Star for the studio.

== Home media ==
Happy Landing was released on Region 0 DVD-R by 20th Century Fox Cinema Archives on December 30, 2013.
