= Hello London =

1960 British film by Sidney Smith

- Theatrical release poster
- Directed by: Sidney Smith
- Screenplay by: Ken Englund; Herbert Sargent; George Fowler
- Produced by: George Fowler
- Starring: Sonja Henie; Michael Wilding; Ronny Graham; Eunice Gayson
- Cinematography: Otto Heller
- Edited by: Oswald Hafenrichter
- Music by: Philip Green; Philip Martell
- Production company: Kinran Pictures
- Release date: 20 October 1960
- Running time: 78 minutes
- Country: United Kingdom
- Language: English

Hello London is a 1960 colour CinemaScope drama-documentary/promotional musical film directed by Sidney Smith and starring Sonja Henie, Michael Wilding, Ronny Graham and Eunice Gayson. It was written by Ken Englund, Herbert Sargent and George Fowler, and produced by Fowler. It was Henie's final film appearance,

Norwegian figure skater and film star Sonja Henie is shown around London before taking part in a charity show. The film features songs, comedy routines and several sequences of Henie's extravagant ice-dance performances.

== Plot ==
Sonja Henie arrives in London with her Stars on Ice touring company and after a show is asked to take part in a benefit concert the next evening in aid of the British Orphans Association. Her manager objects, because it would clash with a Paris engagement. Michael Wilding and Eunice Gayson kidnap him so he misses his plane, and take Henie to a nightclub and a bus tour around London, hoping to persuade her to do the show, which she does.

== Cast ==
- Sonja Henie as herself
- Michael Wilding as himself
- Ronny Graham as himself
- Eunice Gayson as herself

Rest of cast listed alphabetically:

- Dora Bryan as barmaid
- Roy Castle as himself
- Robert Coote as himself
- Lisa Gastoni as herself
- Charles Heslop as himself
- Stanley Holloway as himself
- Oliver Johnston as himself
- Trefor Jones as himself
- Ruth Lee as woman
- Dennis Price as himself
- Oliver Reed as press photographer
- Joan Regan as herself

== Songs ==
- "The Way to Make It Hip" – Roy Castle
- "Do It for Me" – Roy Castle, Sonja Henie, Michael Wilding, Eunice Gayson
- "On Top of a Bus" – Sonja Henie, Michael Wilding and company
- "My Four British Tailors" – Ronny Graham, Dennis Price and Trefor Jones
- "Petticoat Lane" – Stanley Holloway
- "That Deadly Species the Male" – Dora Bryan
- "Fly Alight Fancy and Free" – Sonja Henie and children
- "The Truth of the Matter" – Dennis Price, Eince Gayson, Michael Wilding
- "When You Know Someone Loves You" – Joan Regan
- "The Magic of You" – Sonja Henie and company

== Release ==
The British Film Institute gives the film's release date as 20 October 1960. Other sources, such as The British 'B' Film, Melody in the Dark: British Musical Films, 1946–1972 and British Sound Films: The Studio Years 1928–1959, cite 1958.

== Critical reception ==
The Monthly Film Bulletin wrote: "Why on earth it required three writers to produce this ingenuous concoction of ice spectacle, cabaret, music hall and an itinerary, culminating in a visit to the Battersea Fun Fair, which is nothing if not exhaustive, is something of a mystery. Michael Wilding and the rest, playing themselves, bring little more than an air of frantic gaiety to jokes and music that would scarcely have passed muster twenty years or more ago."

Kine Weekly wrote: "The popular stars and guest artists seize their chances, but the direction and editing lack discipline. At once illuminating and entertaining, its prospects could, nevertheless, be immensely improved by drastic cutting. ... The picture slightly overdoes the 'variety' stuff before getting Sonja Henie and her company on the London bus, but the itinerary, culminating in a visit to the Battersea Fun Fair, is nothing if not comprehensive. Sonja Henie acts naturally and cuts delightful glacial capers as Sonja; and Michael Wilding, Eunice Gayson, Lisa Gastoni, Dennis Price, Stanley Holloway, Dora Bryan, Roy Castle and Joan Regan make their presence felt as themselves. There is more padding towards the finish, but the charity ice show finale glitters."

In British Sound Films: The Studio Years 1928–1959 David Quinlan rated the film as "poor", writing: "Heavily dated patchwork musical."

Augusto Corrieri wrote in In Place of a Show: "The film was an economic flop and turned out to be the last of Sonja Henie's otherwise very successful ice skating-themed movies."

Chibnall and McFarlane in The British 'B' Film called the film: "appalling."

Adrian Wright, in Melody in the Dark: British Musical Films, 1946–1972, writes:

Here is a vanity project by Henie, who planned the film as the first of many she would release wherever she rested her caravan around the globe, in effect what we might now understand as a promotional 'video' intended to boost attendance at her live ice extravaganzas. We must be thankful that the idea was realised with such enthusiasm, resulting in director Sidney Smith's hotchpotch of scenes set on London buses (a cramped location for some ridiculous choreography), in under-populated night-spots, at a gentlemen's outfitter in Savile Row (one of its sales assistants is Welsh tenor Trefor Jones ...), at Battersea's funfair, and in protracted extracts from Ms Henie's ice show of the moment. Presumably, these routines are offered as the main course, but they are so uninventively filmed, and exposed in such cavernous spaces (you can almost feel cinemagoers wishing they'd brought a cardigan), that they fail to warm the spirits. The luxury of Eastmancolor and the expansiveness of Cinemascope do nothing to melt the glacial atmosphere. The permanently fixed smiles of delight on the faces of Wilding, with none of the charisma that sustained him through his long years as Anna Neagle's on-screen lover, and Gayson, and the dialogue they are obliged to reiterate, remind us that actors must eat and will at times do just about anything for the money.
