= Everything Happens at Night =

1939 film by Irving Cummings

- Directed by: Irving Cummings
- Written by: Art Arthur; Robert Harari; F. Scott Fitzgerald (uncredited)
- Produced by: Harry Joe Brown (associate producer)
- Starring: Sonja Henie; Ray Milland; Robert Cummings
- Cinematography: Edward Cronjager; Lucien N. Andriot (uncredited)
- Edited by: Walter Thompson
- Distributed by: 20th Century-Fox
- Release date: December 22, 1939
- Running time: 78 minutes
- Country: United States
- Language: English

Everything Happens at Night is a 1939 American drama-comedy film starring Sonja Henie, Ray Milland and Robert Cummings.

== Plot ==
American Geoffrey Thompson and Englishman Ken Morgan are reporters from rival newspapers who are sent to a remote Swiss village to find Nobel Prize winner Dr. Hugo Norden. Nodern escaped from a concentration camp and was reportedly killed but there are rumors he is living in the village.

Both men arrive in the village and are forced to share a room. They meet Louise, a young woman whom both men fall in love with. It turns out that Louise is Norden's daughter.

Geoffrey intercepts Ken's cable to his paper and directs it to his own paper. The story upsets Louise, who was unaware they were reporters, and brings the Gestapo on a mission to kill Norden. Geoffrey and Ken team up to smuggle Louise and her father across the border to the safety of France.

They are all about to sail to America. Ken arranges for Geoffrey to miss the boat, ensuring that he will have Louise to himself.

== Cast ==
- Sonja Henie as Louise Norden
- Ray Milland as Geoffrey Thompson
- Robert Cummings as Ken Morgan
- Maurice Moscovitch as Dr Hugo Norden
- Leonid Kinskey as Groder
- Alan Dinehart as Fred Sherwood
- Fritz Feld as Gendarme
- Jody Gilbert as Hilda
- Victor Varconi as Cavas
- William Edmunds as Hotel Clerk
- George Davis as Bellhop
- Paul Porcasi as Pierre – Bartender
- Michael Visaroff as Otto – Woodcutter
- Eleanor Wesselhoeft as Woodcutter's Wife
- Christian Rub as Telegrapher
- Ferdinand Munier as Conductor
- Holmes Herbert as Featherstone
- Rolfe Sedan as Waiter
- Frank Reicher as Pharmacist
- John Bleifer as Second Sled Driver

== Production ==
In April 1939 Fox announced the film as part of its slate for the following year. It was based on an original screenplay and was a different type of Sonja Henie vehicle as the storyline was more serious. Richard Greene was originally announced for the role of the English reporter. Greene was delayed working on Little Old New York so Fox borrowed Robert Cummings from Universal.

Filming started in September. Gregory Ratoff had to direct some skating sequences because director Irving Cummins was pulled on to Johnny Apollo. Filming finished by October.

== Reception ==
Filmink said it "feels like the one SH [Henie] film not originally devised for SH. Gloomy, almost film noir treatment. Interesting. Different SH movie. Strong male leads."
