= New Look (TV series) =

British TV comedy series (1958–1959)

New Look is a 1958 to 1959 British television show aired on ITV. It was produced by Associated Television (ATV). It was a comedy programme. Of the 12 episodes made, only five survive.
