= Interim Action Committee on the Film Industry =

Committee

British prime minister Harold Wilson set up a working party in August 1975 to report on 'the requirements of a viable and prosperous British film industry over the next decade'. Chaired by John Terry, the managing director of the National Film Finance Corporation (NFFC), it reported in January 1976, principally recommending the establishment of a British Film Authority to bring together the NFFC, British Film Fund Agency and the film activities of the Department of Education and Science and the Department of Trade. However, before action could be taken, Wilson resigned as prime minister. His successor, James Callaghan appointed an Interim Action Committee on the Film Industry (IAC), with Wilson as chairman, with a view to paving the way for a British Film Authority.

The committee met under the auspices of the Department of Trade and Industry, which provided the secretariat and facilities. Following the election of the Thatcher government in 1979 it became evident that the idea of a British Film Authority was being dropped, although the IAC was retained as a forum for advice about film-related matters. In the 1984 White Paper on Film Policy, which set about removing the mechanisms of state support for the film industry, it was proposed that the IAC should subsume the role of the Cinematograph Films Council. In 1985 the Interim Action Committee was replaced by The British Screen Advisory Council.

== Reports ==
The IAC produced five reports.

- Proposals for the Setting up of a British Film Authority (Cmnd 7071), 1978.
- The Financing of the British Film Industry (Cmnd 7597), Second Report of the Interim Action Committee, 1979.
- Film industry: statistics, technological developments and cable television (Cmnd 7855) Third Report of the Interim Action Committee on the Film Industry, 1980.
- Film and television co-operation (Cmnd 8227) Fourth report of the Interim Action Committee on the Film Industry, January 1981.
- Distribution of films for exhibition in cinemas and by other means (Cmnd 8530) Fifth report of the Interim Action Committee on the Film Industry, January 1981.
