= Guess My Story (Canadian game show) =

- Genre: Quiz show
- Country of origin: Canada
- Original language: English
- No. of seasons: 1

Production
- Running time: 30 minutes

Original release
- Network: CBC Television
- Release: 2 July – 6 August 1954

Guess My Story is a Canadian quiz show that aired on CBC Television in 1954.

== Premise ==
This Toronto-produced quiz show involved four guests, one of which had been involved in an event in the recent news. Three panelists had to ask questions to identify the news story and which of the guests had been involved. The same format was later used to produce the show Front Page Challenge.

== Scheduling ==
This half-hour series aired Fridays at 8:00 p.m. (Eastern) from 2 July to 6 August 1954.
