= Guess My Story (British game show) =

British TV game show (1953–1955)

- Genre: Game show
- Created by: William Taylor
- Country of origin: United Kingdom

Original release
- Network: BBC
- Release: 1953 – 1955

Guess My Story is a British television series which aired from 1953 to 1955 on the BBC. It was a panel game show aired in a 30-minute time-slot. It was conceived by William Taylor.
