= British Screen Forum =

Organization

- Formation: 1985
- Purpose: Promotion of the UK audiovisual industries and government links
- Location: London, W1
- Region served: United Kingdom
- Chairman: Jon Gisby
- Website: British Screen Forum

The British Screen Forum was established in 1985 under the name British Screen Advisory Council, becoming the British Screen Forum in January 2020. It is a membership organisation that represents the audiovisual industries of the United Kingdom and provides thought leadership to the government, the industries and policy makers. British Screen Forum seeks to "frame the debate for the future of the UK screen sectors", primarily through conferences, roundtables and insight events for members at which industry trends are discussed, as well as publishing briefings and reports. Members are drawn from a wide range of organisations, representing writers, technicians, independent producers, directors, distributors, exhibitors, broadcasters, games publishers, games developers, pay TV platforms and online platforms.

== History ==
The British Screen Advisory Council (BSAC) was the successor to the Interim Action Committee on the Film Industry, administered under the auspices of the Department of Trade and Industry (DTI). Initially it did enjoy limited facilities through the DTI, including secretarial assistance. This support was withdrawn in July 1986 as "a consequence of the Government's wish to leave the BSAC to handle its own affairs".

Richard Attenborough served as Honorary President until his death in 2014. Founder Member and long standing Board Member Michael Deeley was subsequently appointed to this post.

The 2020 rebranding as British Screen Forum was accompanied by a new website with enhanced member facilities.

== See also ==
- UK Film Council
