= 20XX =

2017 video game

- Developers: Batterystaple Games; Fire Hose Games
- Publisher: Batterystaple Games
- Director: Chris King
- Artist: Zach Urtes
- Composer: Brandon Ellis
- Platforms: Windows, PlayStation 4, Nintendo Switch, Xbox One
- Release: Windows: October 12, 2016 (Early access); August 16, 2017 (full); PS4, Switch; July 10, 2018; Xbox One; July 11, 2018
- Genre: Platform
- Modes: Single-player, multiplayer

20XX is a platform game developed by American studio Batterystaple Games. The early access version was released for Microsoft Windows on Steam on October 12, 2016, and in full on August 16, 2017. PlayStation 4, Nintendo Switch, and Xbox One versions were released in July 2018. A sequel, 30XX, was released on Steam Early Access on February 17, 2021, and in full on August 9, 2023.

== Gameplay ==
Inspired by Mega Man X, players must defeat enemies and complete difficult platforming challenges to finish a stage. In contrast to Mega Man X, stages are proceduraly generated based on level segments, or "chunks", and allow for both local and online co-op. Rather than giving several lives, the game has permadeath, but is a "roguelite" in that the player can use Soul Chips earned during the level to unlock new types of passive upgrades to buy, and gain upgrades for the next attempt of that particular run.

During levels, players can use bolts gained as currency to buy passive upgrades or to restore health or energy in vending machines. They can find upgrades in treasure chests and other places. Upon beating a boss the player can choose between multiple rewards: the boss's power (granting them a new special ability), bolts, or a random passive upgrade.

== Plot ==
The game follows Nina, an armored girl armed with a power blaster, and Ace, an armored boy with an energy sword, in the aftermath of a robotic uprising. Traveling from their base on the Ark, a space station orbiting the Earth, they have been hired to clear dangerous locations infested with robots running amok.

== Development ==
20XX began development after a crowdfunding campaign on Kickstarter in the spring of 2014, when the game was called Echoes of Eridu. Following a successful Kickstarter, the game joined the Fire Hose Games accelerator program and appeared in the Indie Megabooth at Penny Arcade Expo 2015.

The game was developer Chris King's first commercial game, and its development was prompted by the belief that it was his last chance to do such a risky thing as game development without a family to support, as he was in his late 20s. The idea behind the game was due to his belief that Capcom had ceased to make enough Mega Man titles, and that he and other fans desired more of that style of gameplay.

The developer's main focus was on the game feel and getting it to play similarly to Mega Man. The most difficult aspect of developing the game was debugging its netcode that allowed for online play.

Chris believes that Steam's Early Access program was essential to the development of the game, and he "couldn't imagine" releasing the game without it.

== Soundtrack ==
The game's soundtrack was composed by Brandon "Cityfires" Ellis and includes chiptune and synthesizer elements to make it resemble that of a Super NES game.

== Reception ==
Reception

Aggregate scores
Aggregator	Score
Metacritic	NS: 77/100 (Note: Based on 14 reviews); PS4: 77/100 (Note: Based on 6 reviews); XONE: 79/100 (Note: Based on 6 reviews)
OpenCritic	68% recommend (Note: Based on 47 reviews)

Nintendo Life described the gameplay as addictive, and, although they felt some aspects were a bit repetitive, they said the upgrades and customization made up for it. Nintendo World Report recommended it to fans of Mega Man and platform games, but they felt it should have more story.

== See also ==
- Mega Man X
- Mighty No. 9
