= Trigger Happy =

Trigger Happy may refer to:

- Trigger Happy (book), by Steven Poole
- Trigger Happy!, 1956 jazz album by Herman "Trigger" Alpert
- Triggerhappy (Transformers), a fictional character from the Transformers franchise
- Trigger Happy TV, British television show
- "Trigger Happy" (Weird Al Yankovic song)
- Trigger Happy, a playable character from the Skylanders video game franchise
- Trigger Happy (1961 film)
- Trigger Happy (1996 film)
