= Smart bomb (disambiguation) =

A smart bomb or guided bomb is a precision-guided munition designed to achieve greater accuracy.

Smart bomb may also refer to:

- A precision-guided munition
- Smart Bomb (DC Comics), a fictional character from DC Comics
- Smart Bomb Interactive, a video game development studio based in Salt Lake City, Utah
- Smart Bomb (video game), a 2005 puzzle video game for the PSP
- Smartbomb (book), a 2005 book about the video game industry
- "Smartbomb", a song by BT from the album Movement in Still Life
- Smartbomb (EP), an EP by Left Spine Down
- Smart Bomb (EP), an EP by Thrush Hermit
