= Game Design Workshop =

2004 book by Tracy Fullerton

Game Design Workshop: A Playcentric Approach to Creating Innovative Games
- 4th Edition cover art
- Author: Tracy Fullerton
- Original title: Game Design Workshop: Designing, Prototyping, & Playtesting Games (1st Edition)
- Subject: Game design
- Publisher: AK Peters/CRC Press
- Publication date: 2004, 2008, 2014, 2018, 2023
- Pages: 556
- ISBN: 978-1-138-09877-0
- OCLC: 859196163

Game Design Workshop is a book on game design by Tracy Fullerton, originally published by CMP Books in 2004. It has been updated and released in four subsequent editions, the latest by A K Peters/CRC Press in 2023.

The book is based on the core game design curriculum taught at the USC Interactive Media & Games Division of the USC School of Cinematic Arts. Contributors to the fourth edition include many notable game designers, including: Eric Zimmerman, Christina Norman, Keita Takahashi, Anna Anthropy, Randy Smith, Robin Hunicke, Michael John, Asher Vollmer, Elan Lee, Jane McGonigal, Tim LeTourneau, Chaim Gingold, Jenova Chen, Richard Lemarchand, Frank Lantz, Adrian Hon, Stone Librande, Warren Spector, Kellee Santiago, among others.

Game Design Workshop is cited by numerous sources as one of the "must have" books for new game designers. It is in used in game design courses worldwide.

== See also ==
- List of books on computer and video games
