= Melissa Clark-Reynolds =

New Zealand entrepreneur and director

Melissa Clark-Reynolds ONZM
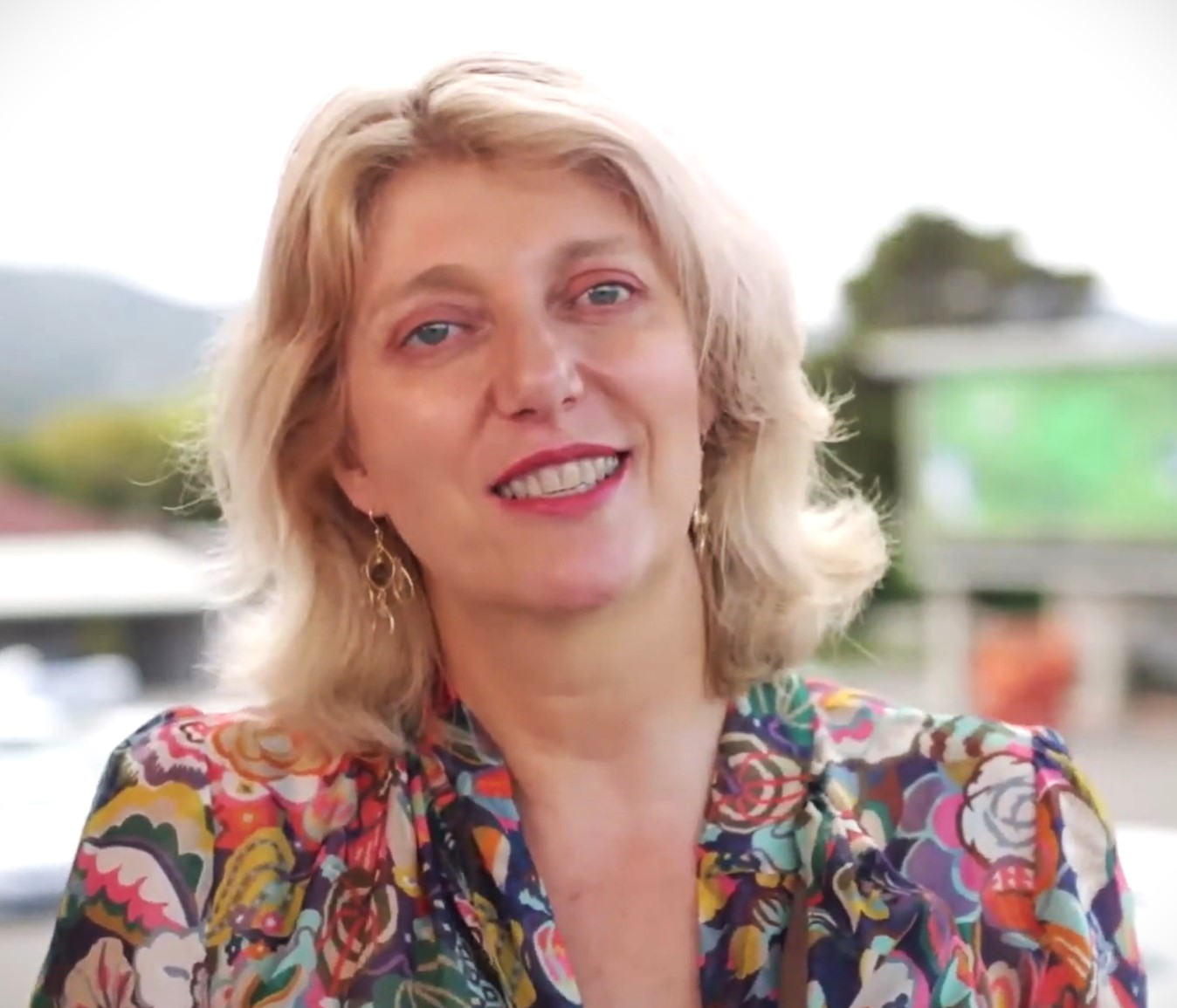
- Clark-Reynolds for Edmund Hillary Fellowship in 2018
- Born: 25 July 1964 (age 62)
- Education: Victoria University of Wellington; Rutgers University
- Occupations: Futurist, Entrepreneur
- Notable work: MiniMonos
- Honours: Officer of the New Zealand Order of Merit (ONZM) 2015
- Website: https://www.melissaclarkreynolds.com/

Melissa Jannet Clark-Reynolds ONZM (born 25 July 1964) is a New Zealand futurist, strategist, entrepreneur, professional director and founder of FutureCentre.nz. She has developed and teaches courses in Strategy, Digital Governance and Disruptive Business Models for the NZ Institute of Directors.

She was awarded the Insignia of an Officer of the New Zealand Order of Merit in the 2015 Queen's Birthday Honours with the citation "for services to the technology industry".

== Early life and education ==
Aged 15, Clark-Reynolds became the then-youngest woman to ever attend university in New Zealand. While still a student, she was a single mother, and began working from home out of necessity, describing her first ventures as "accidental entrepreneurship". After graduating from Victoria University of Wellington with an honours degree in Anthropology focusing on women's health, she later completed a combined Masters Degree in Environmental Health, Waste Management and Epidemiology at Rutgers University.

== Career ==
Returning to New Zealand, Clark-Reynolds launched her first entrepreneurial venture, a health and safety and Workers Compensation Insurance consultancy named GMV Associates. The consultancy was sold to Southern Cross and became Fusion, New Zealand's largest private Workers Compensation insurer.

In 2009, Clark-Reynolds began beta testing an environmentally-themed virtual world, MiniMonos, with interactive media producer Deborah Todd and game designer Noah Falstein. The site officially launched on 1 April 2011 and, by June 2012, had attracted close to 1 million players and £1 million in capital. MiniMonos closed in May 2013.

Earlier in her career, she built and led several technology-based ventures focused on environmental data, analytics, and social impact-projects.

== Governance and leadership ==
Clark-Reynolds became a professional director in 2013 and has since served on the board of many organisations including Wētā Workshop, the Hillary Institute, Birthright New Zealand, Jasmax Architects, Atkins Ranch, Alpine Energy, Daffodil Enterprises Ltd, the NZ Future Bees Trust, Little Yellow Bird, Radio New Zealand, and Beef+Lamb New Zealand.

Her training at MIT, Cambridge University, Stanford University and the Institute for the Future shapes her specialisation as a foresight practitioner.
