= Walden, a game =

2017 video game

- Developer: USC Game Innovation Lab
- Publisher: USC Games
- Designer: Tracy Fullerton
- Programmer: Todd Furmanski
- Artist: Lucas Peterson
- Composer: Michael Sweet
- Engine: Unity
- Platforms: Windows; Mac; PlayStation 4; Xbox One
- Release: Windows, Mac: WW: July 4, 2017; PS4: NA: May 15, 2018; PAL: July 2, 2021; Xbox One: WW: July 2, 2021
- Genres: Walking simulator, serious, educational
- Mode: Single-player

Walden, a game is a first-person open-world video game developed by Tracy Fullerton and the USC Game Innovation Lab for Microsoft Windows, Mac, PlayStation 4, and Xbox One. The game translates the experience of naturalist and author Henry David Thoreau's stay at Walden Pond in 1845–47 to a video game.

== Gameplay and plot ==
The gameplay in Walden, a game is balanced between several goals: surviving in the woods through self-reliant living; seeking inspiration in the woods through attention to animals, sounds, solitude, and books; and exploration and discovery of the social and personal context leading to Thoreau's experiment.

The survival simulation focuses on the four "necessaries of life" as described by Thoreau in the book Walden—food, fuel, shelter, and clothing. Players must care-take these aspects of their life in the woods in order to maintain their energy. If they fail to do so, they will faint from exhaustion.

The inspirational aspects of the game focus on several of the themes discussed in the later chapters of the book Walden—visitors, sound, solitude, and reading. Players can find inspiration by exploring the woods and interacting with animals (visitors), finding places of solitude, which are marked by cairns, listening to the sounds of civilization (wagons, a train whistle, church bells, etc.) that can be heard from the edges of the woods, and reading books found throughout the woods. When the player is inspired, the colors and sounds of the game are richer, however, if they let their inspiration fall, these colors and sounds will become dull.

In addition to care-taking survival and inspiration, the player may also explore Thoreau's world to discover a series of intertwined stories about his life and the tensions in the world around him that sent him to the woods for his experiment in self-reliant living. Letters and visits from his mentor Ralph Waldo Emerson explore his ambitions as a writer. A series of poetic clues from his sister Sophia leads the player to secret areas of the woods and to an understanding of a mutual tragedy. Other storylines follow Thoreau's involvement in the Abolitionist movement of the times, his work as a surveyor, and his connections to prominent scientist Louis Agassiz.

The game takes place over the course of the first year of Thoreau's stay in the woods, as does the book Walden. At the end of the year, as Spring comes, Thoreau experiences a rebirth and re-connection to life, and the player can choose to leave the woods, or to stay and continue their own experiment.

== Development and release ==
The game was developed over the course of ten years as a research project at the USC Game Innovation Lab led by Tracy Fullerton. The game began production in 2007 without funding, but in 2012 was awarded a media arts grant from the NEA to support the production of the game. This support was followed by admission into the Sundance New Frontier Story Lab in 2014, and grants from the NEH Digital Projects for the Public.

The crew for the production was made up of a small core team of faculty and staff from the Game Innovation Lab as well as students who participated over the years. The audio design and music composition for the game was done by Michael Sweet of Berklee College of Music and the score for the game was recorded live at Berklee College. The voice of Henry David Thoreau is performed by actor Emile Hirsch. The game was announced for PlayStation 4 at the 2017 PlayStation Experience.

Walden, a game was first released for Microsoft Windows and macOS via itch.io on July 4, 2017, and via Steam on March 18, 2019. The game was released for PlayStation 4 in North America on May 15, 2018, and in Europe and Australia on July 2, 2021. It was also released worldwide for Xbox One on July 2, 2021.

== Educational Adaptation ==
In 2020, professors at the USC Game Innovation Lab began developing ''Walden, a game EDU", an educational version of the original game. This new version received funding from the National Endowment for the Humanities. The team collaborated with around 100 teachers from various subjects to design the educational content. Their goal was to create something that would help middle and high school students engage with Thoreau's original work, while also supporting teachers in both online and in-person classrooms.

"Walden, a game EDU" consists of four learning modules, each taking around 15 to 30 minutes to play. The first module, "Self-Reliance", focuses on English Language Arts and Social Studies, helping students explore Thoreau's ideas about simple living and his rejection of materialism. The second module, "Where I Lived", looks at the histories of groups who have been left out of mainstream history, including Indigenous peoples, enslaved and freed Black Americans, and immigrants who also lived in Walden Woods. The third module, "What I Lived For", connects Thoreau's relationship with nature. The fourth module, "Civil Disobedience", connects Thoreau's well-known essay of the same name to modern civic activism.

During the beta testing period, the modules were played over 30,000 times. A survey of teachers who used the game in their classrooms showed that 91% rated the educational outcomes as successful or highly successful. In 2022, "Walden, a game EDU" won a gold award in the K-12 education category at the International Serious Games Awards.

== Reception ==
Walden, a game was selected for several festivals prior to its launch, including Indiecade 2014 (Digital Select), Indiecade 2015 (Finalist), Tokyo Game Show Sense of Wonder Night 2015, International Documentary Film Festival 2015, Sheffield Doc Fest 2015 (Special Mention Interactive Award), Meaningful Play 2016 (Most Meaningful Game Award) and Davos Betazone 2017 at the World Economic Forum.

The game received significant press attention after an article on the front page of The New York Times extolled its unique premise: "In 'Walden' Video Game, the Challenge Is Stillness." The launch of the game in July 2017, concurrent with the 200th anniversary of Thoreau's birth, brought attention from Harper's Magazine, The Smithsonian Magazine, The Times, USA Today, CNN, Rock, Paper, Shotgun, Slate, Salon and Rolling Stone among others. Press reaction to the game was positive, citing beautiful visuals, a slow pace allowing for reflection, and historical accuracy of the content. The game was given a five star rating by Common Sense Media for its positive messages, role models and educational value.

At the 2017 Games for Change Festival Walden, a game was awarded Game of the Year and Most Significant Impact. At the 2017 Indiecade Festival, it was awarded the Developers Choice Award along with Where the Water Tastes Like Wine. It was also nominated for the Off-Broadway Award for Best Indie Game at the New York Game Awards 2018.

Reception

Review score
Publication	Score
Adventure Gamers	2/5 stars

Walden, a game was one of the top purchased games of 2017 on Itch.io as well as one of the top tipped games on the platform of that year.
