= Reality Ends Here =

Pervasive game at the University of Southern California School of Cinematic Arts

Reality Ends Here is a pervasive game developed and run by students and faculty at the USC School of Cinematic Arts incorporating elements of environmental games, card games, and alternate reality games. Taking place over the course of the fall semester, it aims to foster creativity and collaboration amongst incoming students to the School of Cinematic Arts. It also aims to develop a sense in students "that there is a secret society of media makers—the Reality Committee—watching their every move."

== Overview ==
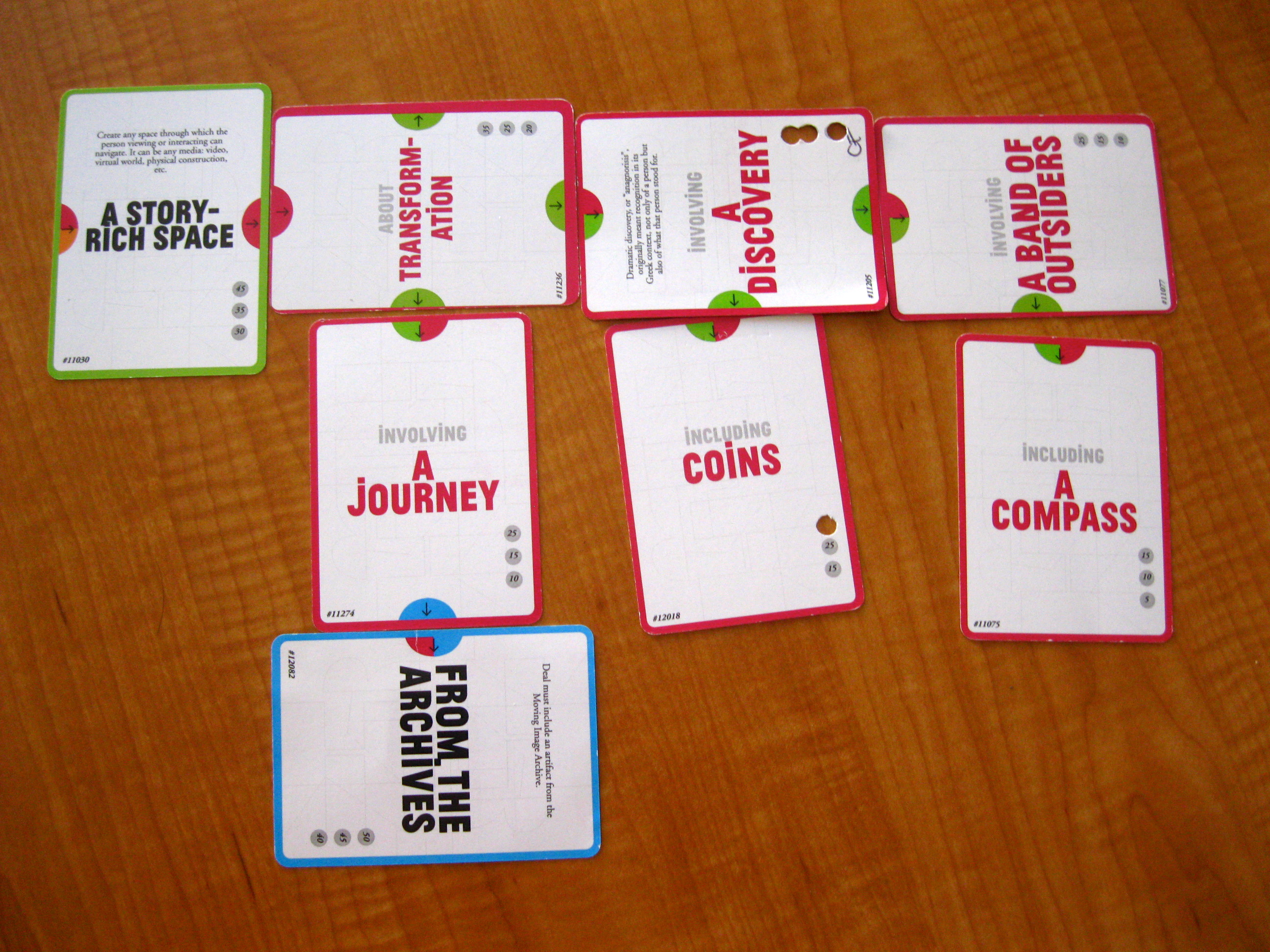
Reality Ends Here Playing Cards used to create a simple deal

Reality Ends Here incorporates elements of alternate reality games for use in an educational context and uses game mechanics to foster collaboration within first-semester Freshmen at the School of Cinematic Arts. Players are drawn in by cryptic clues in the environment, and being secretly monitored, during the pre-semester welcome week by a series of mysterious communications from the Reality Committee, a Committee made up of various students, faculty, and notable alumni. After solving a series of environmental puzzles, players discover a secret office where they are initiated by swearing an oath of DIY-media making and receive a pack of collectible game cards.

By combining sets of cards, players generate creative prompts for media-making projects known as Deals. Players must then create a film, game, image-set, live-event, or any other piece of artwork that satisfies the cards used in the Deal, submit it to the Reality Committee and justify it for points, which are tallied up on an online leaderboard. Weekly leaders are invited to spontaneous mentorship adventures[what does that mean?] with industry leaders and other notable alumni. Additional cards can be acquired through scavenger-hunt like puzzles or reaching specific points milestones.

== Development ==
Unofficial versions of the game have been played since the school's inception, taking various forms throughout the years. Reality Ends Here was originally developed as Jeff Watson's Ph.D dissertation project, and was designed by Watson, Simon Wiscombe, and Tracy Fullerton. The project was commissioned by a committee led by professor Holly Willis at the behest of USC School of Cinematic Arts Dean Elizabeth Daley.

Reality Ends Here was run and operated by a committee of students working with Watson named the "Game Runners". 2011 was run by Anna Lotko, and 2012's Game Runners included Will Cherry, Michael Effenberger, and Sam Sandweiss. The game's 2013 run was operated by Simon Wiscombe, Kevin Wong, and Esteban Fajardo. After the game's cancellation and alleged re-emergence in 2014, it was taken over by Jesse Vigil along with anonymous students selected from the previous year's season and ran at least until 2017. It is unknown if the game is still running.

== History ==
The first formal season of the game began in 2011. Before this, students played with rules passed down from previous years that were frequently changed or discarded. Season 1 of Reality Ends Here included 150 participants who submitted a total of 120 projects. Though there were instances of "severe competitiveness", the game was ultimately deemed a success, leading to a second season being run the following year. The game's second season, run in 2012, generated over 190 projects created by over 170 participants. The third season broke previous records with a final count of 251 projects created by 191 players, though unlike other years, 2013 was marked by a lack of teams and instead by a core group of highly prolific creators who periodically collaborated as a large group on projects like the UNI School of Bollywood Arts, a crowdfunded transmedia franchise that is "likely the largest and most complex project to have emerged from the game."

== Reception ==
Reality Ends Here was the recipient of the 2012 IndieCade Impact Award.

== Cancellation ==
Reality Ends Here was cancelled in fall of 2014. However, on August 20, a group of former Reality players going by "uncncld" (an abbreviation of "un-cancelled") started a new version of the game, heavily modified from Jeff Watson's dissertation project and the game's initial rules in a return to the pre-Watson era.
