= The Book of Games Volume 2 =

2007 video game compendium

- Cover artist: Fridtjof Leivestad
- Language: English
- Series: The Book of Games
- Publisher: gameXplore NA Inc
- Publication date: November 2007
- Publication place: United States
- Media type: Soft cover
- ISBN: 978-82-997378-2-1
- OCLC: 191735686

The Book of Games Volume 2 is a game compendium by gameXplore, examining 100 video games from November 2006 through November 2007 covering most of the current game platforms. It covers topics such as Hardcore Gaming, LAN Events, Indie Game Development, Videogames as Art, Music in Games, Professional Gamers, Future of Games, etc. It contains interviews with Tony Hawk, Rob Pardo, Al Lowe, Jun Takeuchi and Petter Solberg.

== See also ==
- List of books on computer and video games
- The Book of Games Volume 1
