= Fun Inc =

2010 book by Tom Chatfield

Fun Inc.: Why games are the 21st Century's most serious business
- Author: Tom Chatfield
- Language: English
- Genre: Non-fiction
- Published: January 2010
- Publisher: Virgin Books (UK); Pegasus Books (US)
- Pages: 258
- ISBN: 9780753519851
- OCLC: 444416256

Fun Inc is a book first published in January 2010 by Tom Chatfield, examining video games in terms of their cultural status, potentials as a medium and as a business. It addresses popular concerns such as the debate over violence in games, as well as the questions of games as art, as one of the most fundamental of human cultural activities, and as a potentially transforming force in the social sciences, economics and 21st century life.

The UK edition is published by Virgin Books (ISBN 0-7535-1985-2) while the US edition is published by Pegasus Books (ISBN 1-60598-143-5).

== See also ==
- Video game studies
- List of books about video games
