= The Ultimate History of Video Games =

2001 book

- First rerelease
- Author: Steven L. Kent
- Publisher: Three Rivers Press
- Publication place: United States
- Pages: 624
- ISBN: 0-7615-3643-4
- OCLC: 47254175

The Ultimate History of Video Games is a 2001 non-fiction book by Steven L. Kent published initially by Prima Publishing and later by Three Rivers Press. It is an updated version of the self-published The First Quarter: A 25-Year History of Video Games.

== Development ==
Steven L. Kent worked as a video game reviewer and journalist for publications such as Electronic Games, The Seattle Times, and USA Today. In the course of his press work, he interviewed many major players in the video game industry and began work on a comprehensive history of video games, originally titled Electronic Nation. Though his initial plan was to publish the book in 1995, he was unable to find an interested publisher. Research collected for the book started appearing in Next Generation magazine as articles starting in 1996.

After failing to interest a publisher, Kent decided to self-publish the book as The First Quarter: A 25-Year History of Video Games on November 1, 2000, under the label BWD Press. Initially, 5,000 copies of the 466 page book were purchasable on Amazon or at a few select game stores. These sold quickly and attracted the interest of Prima Publishing, a division of Random House. Kent revised the text, added an index, and pushed the narrative forward into 2001 - though he regretted not being able to cover the impending launches of the Xbox and GameCube consoles. The book was published in October 2001 and titled The Ultimate History of Video Games, which the author did not initially like.

The book is based on over 500 interviews, including multiple discussions with key industry leaders at companies like Atari Inc., Nintendo, Electronic Arts, and Sega. Most of the interview content is presented in a blockquote style. Three potential interview sources declined to participate. Other sources included online databases and the work of other historians such as Leonard Herman's Phoenix: The Fall and Rise of Videogames and Curt Vendel of Atari Museum.

The book was rereleased widely through Random House imprint Three Rivers Press. It received three separate revisions, with small changes being made to the final chapter. In August 2021, Kent published a continuation called The Ultimate History of Video Games, Volume 2 under Penguin Random House. The original volume was republished as The Ultimate History of Video Games, Volume 1.

== Reception ==
The First Quarter: A 25-Year History of Video Games was well received by the game enthusiast press, though it was criticized for lack of editorial rigor. Brian Deuel of Syzygy Magazine gave it 4/5 stars, saying "Notwithstanding the problems within the text, you'd be hard-pressed to find a better book about the history of video games." LudoScience called it "an absolute must-read for anyone interested in the history of video games". Computer Gaming World described it as "Packed with interesting stories and anecdotes from all the key players on any game you could think of, it's a fascinating book for the well-read gamer." Mark Androvich writing for Classic Gamer Magazine praised its prescience as a foundational work in the young subject of video game history. Ken Gagne of Gamebits said it suffered from frequent typos and disliked that Kent largely withheld his own opinion.

The Ultimate History of Video Games received much more attention upon its release. Next Generation gave the book five out of five stars in their a 2001 holiday buying guide reviewing several game history related books. Charles Ardai wrote in Computer Gaming World praised its nuanced coverage of certain subjects, though criticized its black and white photographs and said the later part of the book "gets a little dry". Tim Rotertson at MyMac.com called Kent a "gifted writer" and gave the book a 5/5 rating, but suggested that it should have been multiple volumes for more depth.

Retrospective reviews have largely praised the breadth of the book's coverage. Nintendo Life in 2020 called the book Kent's "seminal work". Publishers Weekly noted Kent's "infectious enthusiasm" and called the book "a loving tribute" to the videogame industry.

The Ultimate History of Video Games has been widely cited by other work covering video games including academic publications. The First Quarter was adopted as a textbook by the DigiPen Institute of Technology soon after its release. A reader named Zube created errata for both The First Quarter and The Ultimate History of Video Games on his website; being thanked in the acknowledgments of the latter book.
