= MiniMonos =

2011 video game

- Developer(s): Melissa Clark-Reynolds; Greg Montgomery
- Publisher(s): MiniMonos LLC.
- Engine: Adobe Flash
- Platform(s): Online
- Release: 1 April 2011
- Genre(s): MMORPG
- Mode(s): Multiplayer

MiniMonos was a virtual world for children six and above. Players created a monkey avatar on MiniMonos, socialized with other monkeys, and played mini games. The game incorporated themes of environmentalism and encouraged "green" activities among its players, both online and offline. The game was popular with children around the world, particularly in the UK, US, Australia and New Zealand, where the game was invented. The game closed on 12 May 2013.

== History ==
Entrepreneur Melissa Clark-Reynolds came up with the idea for an environmentally-themed virtual world in 2008, based on her perceived lack of such a game. Taking her daughter swimming with turtles, she realised that one day her daughter could possibly tell her own children "There used to be turtles". This prompted Clark-Reynolds to create an online place for children where fun came first, but which taught them the values of looking after the planet.

Clark-Reynolds worked with interactive media producer Deborah Todd and game designer Noah Falstein to create MiniMonos. After a beta phase, the site officially launched on 1 April 2011. By June 2012, the site had attracted close to 1 million players, and had raised over £1 million in capital.

MiniMonos launched an in-real-life game card system on 26 October 2011. This system put Gold Membership cards into Sainsbury's stores across the United Kingdom. These cards gave user who obtained them, and used them, the ability to gain: 1 month, or 6 months of premium membership to their monkey, and the 6 month option came at a reduced-on-card price. The cards, along with the membership, give the user special xPowers (a MiniMonos creation) which they can use in game. Gold Membership cards have been released in New Zealand and Australia.

Clark-Reynolds revealed the closure of MiniMonos on 29 April 2013. The site was closed down on 12 May 2013.

== Features ==
=== Avatars ===
Players created avatars for themselves that are of monkeys.

=== Mini games ===
MiniMonos had a wide variety of mini games, each having something to do with helping the environment, such as recycling trash, cleaning up a lagoon, or growing fresh strawberries. A few examples can be seen below.

==== Monkey Flight ====
The first mini game to appear on MiniMonos was "Monkey Flight". The objective of Monkey Flight was to fly and collect wind clouds as an energy source to continue flying. The player had to avoid black clouds and smog, and collect the clean white clouds to win. If the player hit the ground and couldn't get up via one of the trampolines, the game was over. The collected wind clouds powered a windmill at the player's tree house.

==== R.A.T.S. ====
"R.A.T.S." stands for ‘Recycle All That Stuff". It was a simple game where rubbish fell from a conveyor belt and players threw it, using a monkey catapult, into the appropriate recycling bin, while avoiding the mischievous bird. Players could click on the metal tube at the top to make rubbish come down instantly. Players received recycled material that they could use to build robot pets and trade with other players.

==== Grow ====
"Grow" was a game of skill, where the goal was to clear all 100 plots of land in 22 clicks or less. The fewer clicks, the more berries were grown. Players could also engage in games of "Tic Tac Poo" to win compost to aid their gardens. The amount of berries that grew if you won depended on how many moves the player took and if they used compost.

==== Monkey Fist ====
"Monkey Fist" was a high-thrill game on MiniMonos Island where players went head-to-head against up to 10 other players. The goal of the game was to be the last monkey standing, while knocking everybody else out. Wu Lee created a pose every round, and the goal was to not match his pose, as the player could not be the master; he was. The last monkey remaining advanced through the ranks.

=== Items ===
MiniMonos offered players the opportunity to find objects, such as trash and jewels, and to find or earn game currency (in the form of Banana Chips and Shells) which they could use to buy other objects (such as costume elements for their avatars) at the game's store, Traderz. Themed activities and events called for different costumes and items. The purchase of some items was restricted to members who have purchased (using real-life money) premium memberships.

Users were permitted to own one of any type of clothing item which could change colour.

=== Top Caps ===
MiniMonos created an in-game feature, in which users could do tasks, (ranging from simple to difficult), to earn "Top Caps." Top Caps were earned by beating an opponent in a battle, meeting new friends, getting a high score, doing a real life project, and other activities. Top Caps could be referred to as "badges" which players can collect and show off, through their player card/journal.

The game had about 100 Top Caps.

== Child safety ==
MiniMonos was primarily aimed at children, so several safety features were incorporated into the site:

1. An adult's email address was required to register and activate the child's account.
2. All inter-user communication was monitored in real time. Any violations of the site's policies (such as requesting personal information) were followed by escalating levels of warnings, the violator would be banned from the site after enough violations. In more extreme cases the user was banned immediately and steps were taken to prevent them from coming back onto the site.
3. The game was also monitored by real human moderators and used a chat filtration system.
4. Parents were informed in cases of any personal details being shared or incidents of ‘dating’ talk.

== Social action ==
MiniMonos founder Clark-Reynolds ran her company in line with the ideals being taught in her game. The MiniMonos server was taken offline during Earth Hour, and the company donated clean drinking water to children in India for every new paid membership. MiniMonos players also adopted Orangutans, and donated to WWF through the purchase of costumes and campaigned to save tigers.

The popular EcoMonkey program saw players create over 900 real-life eco-projects, giving an online reward on MiniMonos for offline sustainability actions.

== Reviews ==
Common Sense Media gave MiniMonos four stars, citing its environmental themes and attention to child safety. DIY Father praised MiniMonos for making environmentalism an integral part of the gameplay, without browbeating the players with the message.

The company partnered with WWF-NZ in support of the global WWF Tiger Initiative and has adopted four orangutans through Orangutan Outreach.

TechCrunch calls MiniMonos "..a fun 'Green' game for boys". ReadWriteWeb commended MiniMonos for its commitment to reward offline sustainability activities. Climate Mama gave MiniMonos its Climate Mama Seal of Approval. In a review on Elephant Journal, MiniMonos was praised for its engagement with players, sustainability and safety.
