= The Book of Games Volume 1 =

2006 video game compendium

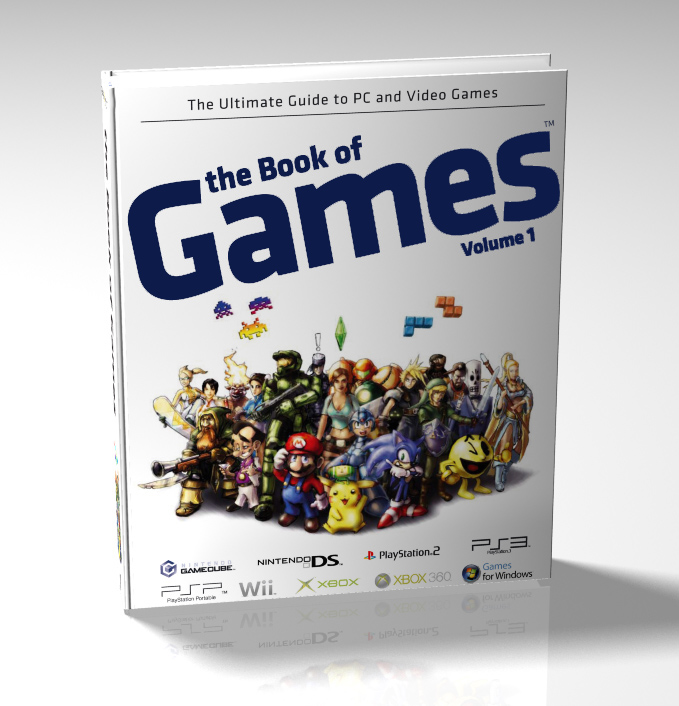
- Language: English
- Publisher: gameXplore NA Inc
- Publication date: November 1, 2006
- Publication place: United States
- ISBN: 82-997378-0-X (hardcover)
- OCLC: 191735686

The Book of Games Volume 1 is a game compendium by gameXplore, examining 150 video games from 2005 through 2006 covering most of the current game platforms. It covers topics such as the future of games, game heroes, from games to movies, and research on games.

== See also ==
- List of books on computer and video games
- The Book of Games Volume 2
