= 30XX =

2023 video game

- Developer: Batterystaple Games
- Publisher: Batterystaple Games
- Composer: Brandon “Cityfires” Ellis
- Platforms: Windows; Nintendo Switch
- Release: Windows: WW: August 9, 2023; Nintendo Switch: WW: September 9, 2023
- Genres: Rogue-lite, platform
- Modes: Single-player, multiplayer

30XX is a rogue-lite platform game from independent developer Batterystaple Games and the sequel to 20XX. It was released on Microsoft Windows via Steam early access on February 17, 2021, and in full on August 9, 2023. A Nintendo Switch release was planned on the same day, but was delayed to September 1. Like its predecessor, 30XX was inspired by the Mega Man series, but uses procedurally generated levels. The game possesses both a permadeath roguelike mode and, unlike the original, a new "Mega Mode" where the levels of the entire game are generated in advance and do not change upon death, giving players an experience more similar to the Mega Man games. The game follows the android main characters of 20XX, Nina and Ace, who awaken after a millennium to discover the world has changed irreversibly after the advent of the Synthetic Mind. The early access release of the game was positively received by critics, who called it an improvement over its predecessor.

== Development ==
Following complaints about the art style of 20XX, the art style was revamped for the sequel to be more similar to games such as Mega Man ZX. The sprites were created by the artist of Rogue Legacy, Glauber Kotaki.

== Reception ==
Reception

Aggregate scores
Aggregator	Score
Metacritic	NS: 86/100 (Note: Based on 9 reviews); PC: 82/100 (Note: Based on 11 reviews)
OpenCritic	96% recommend (Note: Based on 25 reviews)

TJ Denzer of Shacknews called the game "sure to please any platforming fan whether you dig roguelikes or not". Mike Minotti of VentureBeat said that the game had a "nice visual boost" from its predecessor.
