= Steven Poole =

British writer

Steven Poole (born 1972) is a British author, journalist, and video game theorist. He particularly concerns himself with the abuse of language and has written two books on the subject: Unspeak (2006) and Who Touched Base in My Thought Shower? (2013).

== Biography ==
Poole studied English at Emmanuel College, Cambridge, and has subsequently written for publications including The Independent, The Guardian, The Times Literary Supplement, The Sunday Times, and the New Statesman. He has published two books and currently writes a weekly nonfiction book-review column in the Saturday Guardian called Et Cetera, as well as regular longer book reviews, plus a monthly column in Edge magazine. Poole was invited to deliver the opening keynote address at the 2006 Sydney Writers' Festival, and also gave a keynote at the 2008 Future and Reality of Gaming conference in Vienna.

== Books ==
=== Trigger Happy and Trigger Happy 2.0 ===
Trigger Happy was published in 2000 by 4th Estate in the UK (with the subtitle 'The Inner Life of Videogames') and by Arcade Publishing in the US (with the subtitle 'Videogames and the Entertainment Revolution'). Investigating the aesthetics of videogames, Poole notes similarities and differences to other artforms such as cinema, painting and literature, and finally offers a description of games as semiotic systems that may provoke 'aesthetic wonder'. In 2007, Poole released a PDF version of the book for free download on his website, calling it an 'experiment' in the tip-jar model for writers.

In 2013, a collection of Poole's Edge columns was published as Trigger Happy 2.0.

=== Unspeak ===
Unspeak was published in 2006 by Little, Brown in the UK, and by Grove Press in the US. The second UK edition (2007) has the subtitle 'Words Are Weapons'. It is a book about language in contemporary politics, structured around buzzphrases, for which he names 'community', climate change/global warming, and 'war on terror' as examples. The book was shortlisted for Index on Censorship's T.R. Fyvel Award in 2006. According to Poole, 'unspeak' is related to framing: it is a rhetorical way of naming an issue so as to avoid having to argue one's position, and to render the opposing position inexpressible. In a negative review of the book in the Guardian, former British government communications chief Alastair Campbell wrote, 'I am not quite sure what Poole is trying to say.' Since publication of the book, the author has continued to discuss new examples of unspeak at the book's dedicated blog.

=== Who Touched Base in My Thought Shower? ===
Who Touched Base in My Thought Shower? was released in October 2013 by Sceptre, an imprint of Hodder & Stoughton. The book was expanded from an article written for The Guardian and ridicules workplace jargon. The Spectator thought it "does show occasional signs of having been written in a rush, but it's a valuable glossary to corporate life and demonstrates the empty-headed arrogance of what passes for management style."

=== Rethink: the Surprising History of Ideas ===
Rethink: the Surprising History of Ideas was released in 2016 by. Among other subjects, it takes up the life-cycle of bad ideas and argues that retooling past ideas often leads to significant progress and innovation.

== Journalism ==
Poole writes book reviews and literary and cultural essays for numerous publications, including a long obituary of Jean Baudrillard for The Guardian, and a critique of the work of Alain de Botton.

== Media ==
In 2004, Poole presented a television documentary for BBC Four called Trigger Happy: The Invincible Rise of the Video Game, based on his book. He also appeared in the documentary Thumb Candy, and has guested on BBC Radio 4 and other outlets in numerous discussions about language, including an appearance on the Today programme in 2009 talking about the term "swine flu".

== Other activities ==
Poole is also a composer of music for documentary and short films, including the short film EVOL.
