= Tom Chatfield =

British author, broadcaster and tech philosopher

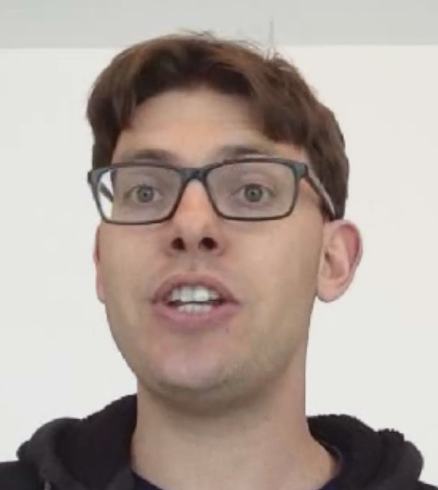
- Chatfield in 2015
- Born: 1980 (age 45–46)
- Education: St John's College, Oxford University
- Occupation: Author
- Writing career
- Years active: 2010 onwards
- Period: 21st century
- Genres: Non-fiction; fiction
- Subject: Digital culture
- Notable works: Fun Inc (2010); This Is Gomorrah (2019)
- Notable awards: Prix Douglas Kennedy (2020)
- Website: tomchatfield.net

Dr Tom Chatfield (born 1980) is a British author, broadcaster, and tech philosopher. Chatfield has written books on digital culture. He is also a public speaker on the subject area. Chatfield was appointed Chair of the Authors' Licensing and Collecting Society (ALCS) in 2023.

== Biography ==
Chatfield took his BA, MPhil and doctorate degrees and taught at St John's College, Oxford, before beginning work as a writer and editor.

Chatfield's first book, on the culture of video games, Fun Inc, was published in 2010. Further books explored digital culture. He is an associate editor at Prospect magazine, Fellow at The School of Life and past guest faculty member at the Said Business School, Oxford, as well as a columnist for the BBC. During 2017, he was a Visiting Associated at the Oxford Internet Institute.

Chatfield is a speaker and consultant on technology and new media. For example, he spoke at TED Global 2010 on "7 ways games reward the brain", was lead content designer and writer on Preloaded's game The End, and appears regularly in the British and international media as a commentator. His work is published in over two dozen languages.

Italian think tank LSDP named him among its 100 top global thinkers for his work.

== Books ==
Chatfield has written a number of books:

- Wise Animals (2024): published by Pan Macmillan which explores the history of human's relationship with technology.
- How to Think (2021): published by SAGE Publishing.
- This Is Gomorrah (2019): Chatfield's debut novel (The Gomorrah Gambit in the US), published by Hodder & Stoughton in July 2019, and is the first of a series of techno-thrillers set in the world of the dark net. It was a Sunday Times thriller of the month, shorted as thriller of the year for the CWA Steel Dagger award, and won the 2020 Prix Douglas Kennedy in France as best foreign thriller.
- Critical Thinking (2017): published in November 2017 as a lead global title by SAGE Publishing, and offers a guide to critical thinking skills for the 21st century.
- Live This Book! (2015): published in August 2015 by Penguin, and is a print-only journal offering 100 exercises aimed at self-exploration, creativity, and critical thinking.
- Netymology (2013): published in March 2013 by Quercus, telling the stories behind 100 of the digital age's terms and ideas: e.g., the @ and Apple symbols, grokking, Trojans, and zombies.
- How to Thrive in the Digital Age (2012): published in May 2012 by Pan Macmillan in association with The School of Life, as part of a six-book series of guides to modern living edited by Alain de Botton. Chatfield's book examines the implications of wired life for contemporary lives, society and culture.
- 50 Digital Ideas You Really Need to Know (2011): published in September 2011 by Quercus, and introducing 50 key ideas for understanding the digital age, ranging from the basics of email and markup languages to location-based services, virtual goods and the semantic web.
- Activism or Slacktivism? (2011): published in July 2011 as a short eBook by Vintage Digital, and examines the impact of new media on politics and political activism.
- Fun Inc (2010): published in 2010 by Virgin Books in the UK and by Pegasus Books in the US. An investigation of the business, cultural significance and larger lessons to be learned from the video games industry, it addresses popular concerns such as the debate over violence in games, as well as the questions of games as art, as a basic human activity, and as an index of ongoing transformations in the social sciences, economics, and 21st-century life.
