= Game feel =

Term for the sensation of controlling a video game

Game feel is the intangible, tactile sensation experienced when interacting with video games. The term has no agreed upon definition. Game designer Steve Swink, who popularized it, defines game feel as "real-time control of virtual objects in a simulated space, with interactions emphasized by polish." Later researchers describe it more broadly as the affective aspect of real-time interactivity or as the player's sensory and emotional response to a game.

Game feel is typically associated with spatial video games whose mechanics center on controlling the movement of objectivs or characters. Because most video games are spatial, research on game feel focuses primarily on movement and physical interactions between in-game objects.The goal of good game feel is to immerse the player in an engaging and rewarding experience. A way to test game feel is to see if interacting with a game's most basic mechanics feels satisfying. At minimum, the game should feel engaging to play even after the plot, points, level design, music, and graphics are removed; if it is not, then the game may suffer from poor game feel.

== History ==
=== Early accounts ===
Games played with physical components have a feel of their own, and research on boardgame players found that materiality is important to them. In his 1983 book Pilgrim in the Microworld, David Sudnow describes playing Breakout in front of a darkened television with the sound turned off, unable to stop thinking "bump" each time the ball hit something.

=== Theoretical roots ===
The bridge between emotions and gameplay was described in terms of the flow theory of Mihaly Csikszentmihalyi, which Sweetser & Wyeth applied to games in 2005, then Jenova Chen applied to games in 2006 as a balance between challenge and ability. The MDA framework of 2004 lists sensation, defined as "game as sense-pleasure." among eight aesthetic experiences of play.

=== Terminology and standardization ===
The term has no agreed upon definition, as each developer has their own term to describe it. Journalist Tim Rogers calls the feeling of pushing against a game's system "friction". The concept was formalized in a 2007 article on Gamasutra and a 2008 book by Steve Swink as "real-time control of virtual objects in a simulated space, with interactions emphasized by polish.". Pichlmair and Johansen grouped game feel design into physicality, amplification, and support in their 2020 survey.

== Metrics ==
There is no industry standard for measuring game feel, as the experience is highly subjective and defined differently by individual players and developers.

To establish a structured framework for research and analysis, Steve Swink's book Game Feel: A Game Designer's Guide to Virtual Sensation (2008) categorizes the experience into six distinct areas: input, response, context, polish, metaphor, and rules.

=== Input ===
Input is the means by which a player can control the game. The physical input device used by the player has an effect on game feel; for instance, using a joystick to control movement feels natural because the joystick itself offers physical feedback. In other cases, like with touchscreens, the input device can offer little feedback and be cumbersome for the player to use.

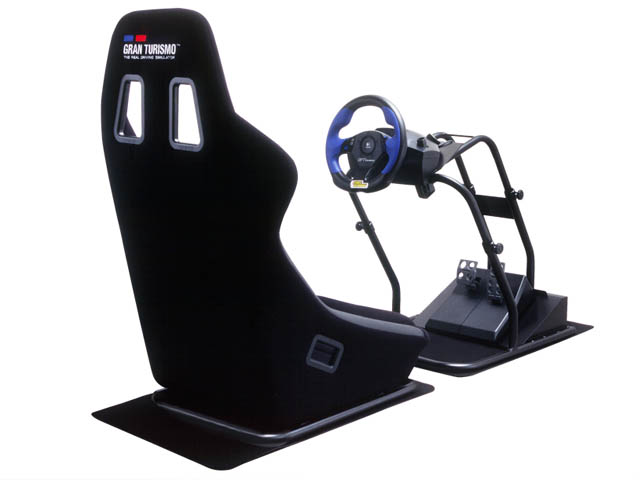
Official Gran Turismo kit with GT Force and Racing Cockpit

Game feel can be improved by using a control scheme that is easily understood by the player. Natural mappings allows a game designer to connect a game's movement mechanics to an input device. Realistic racing games, like Gran Turismo, make the most sense when using a racing wheel controller; in this case the input device directly matches the game's movement mechanics. Arcade cabinets often have unique controls to better relate to their movement mechanics. For example, Centipede uses a trackball as its main input; the inclusion of a trackball allows the player to move in all directions with ease, which is the main focus of the game's mechanics.

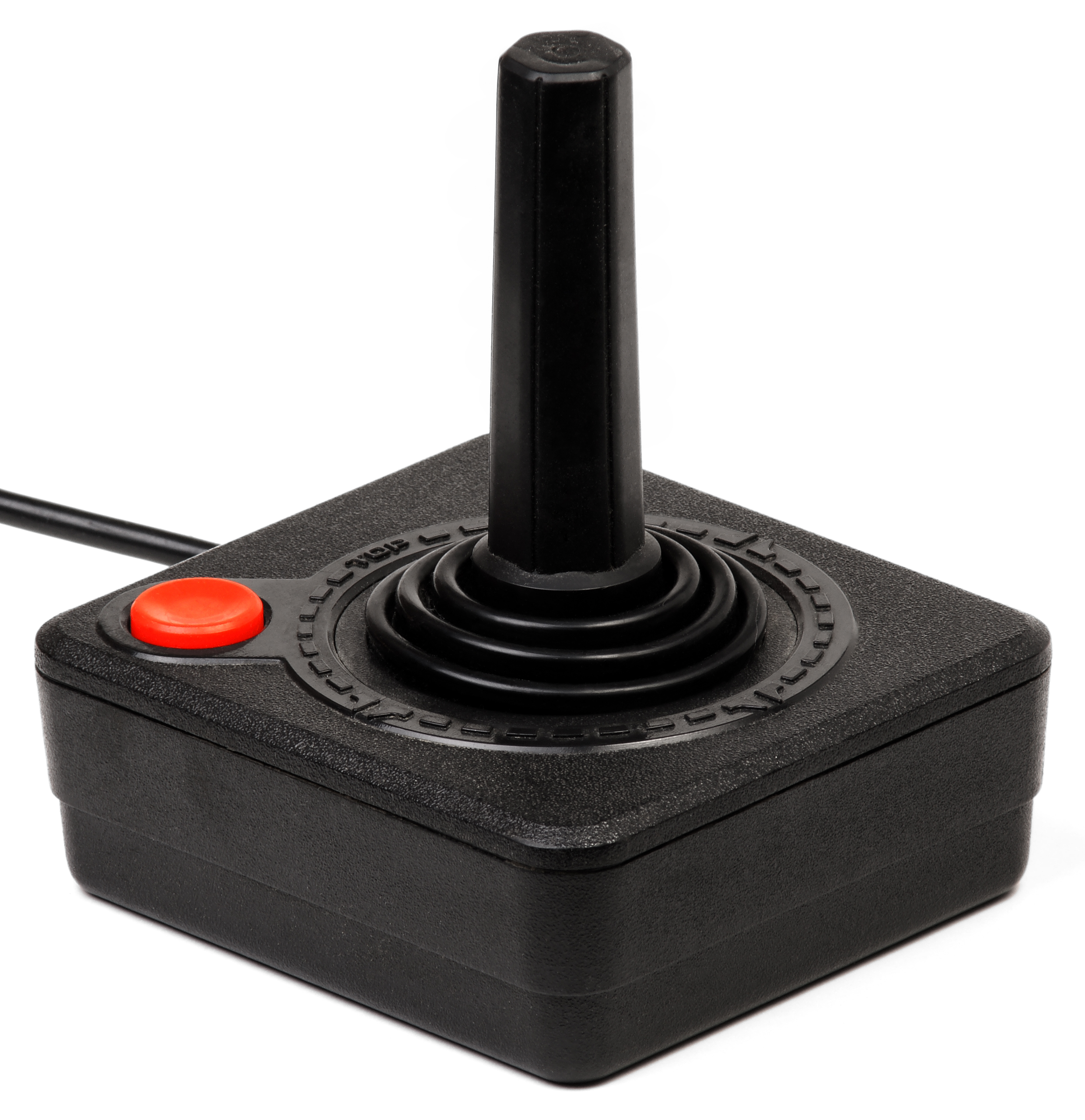
An Atari 2600 joystick, featuring a single directional stick and one action button

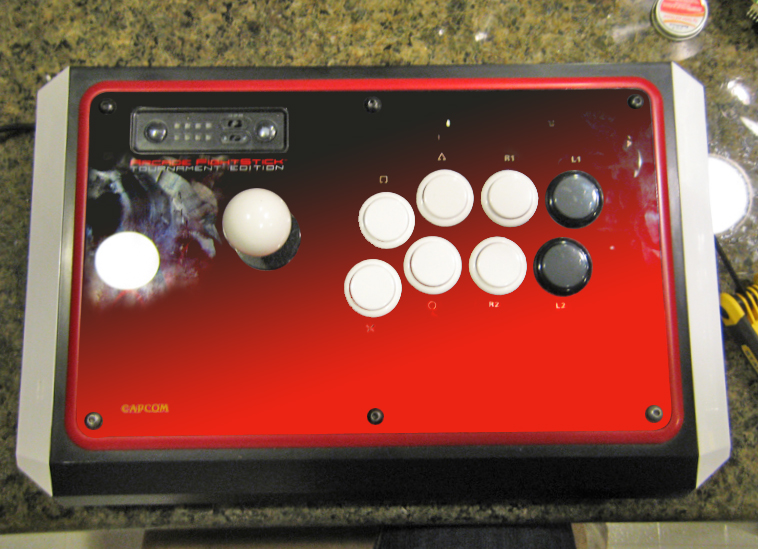
A Street Fighter IV arcade controller, featuring a directional joystick and multiple action buttons

Input sensitivity also plays a role in game feel. Sensitivity is defined as a "rough measure of the amount of expressiveness inherent in a particular input device." Each different controller has a unique inherent sensitivity, and because of that the pairing of controller and game can have a dramatic impact on game feel. A game that requires precision being matched with a low-sensitivity controller can make the game hard to play or even frustrating.

To evaluate input, Steve Swink categorizes the metric into three levels:

- Micro level: The individual components of an input device that, when interacted with, send a real-time signals to a medium to generate immediate feedback for the player.
- Macro level: The complete combination of all inputs on a device as a whole, which allow designers to evaluate the overall input sensitivity and possibility space of one device compared to another. For example, a standard joystick is limited to directional movement, restricting the player to one input at a time. In contrast, a modern controller features multiple buttons and sticks that can be pressed simultaneously, offering a wider range of input combinations and higher sensitivity.

The difference dictates hardware choices based on game complexity; simple games like Pac-Man utilize a joystick for precise four-way directional control, while complex games like Street Fighter require an arcade controller, which is a combination of both joysticks and buttons to execute advanced action sequences.

- Tactile level: The physical properties and structural quality of the input device, including its weight, construction materials, and the mechanical feel of its buttons.

=== Response ===
Response is how the game interprets and reacts to player input. To understand the response of an input, the designer must identify what the input is intended to do, which parameters it changes, and whether those changes are related to one another.

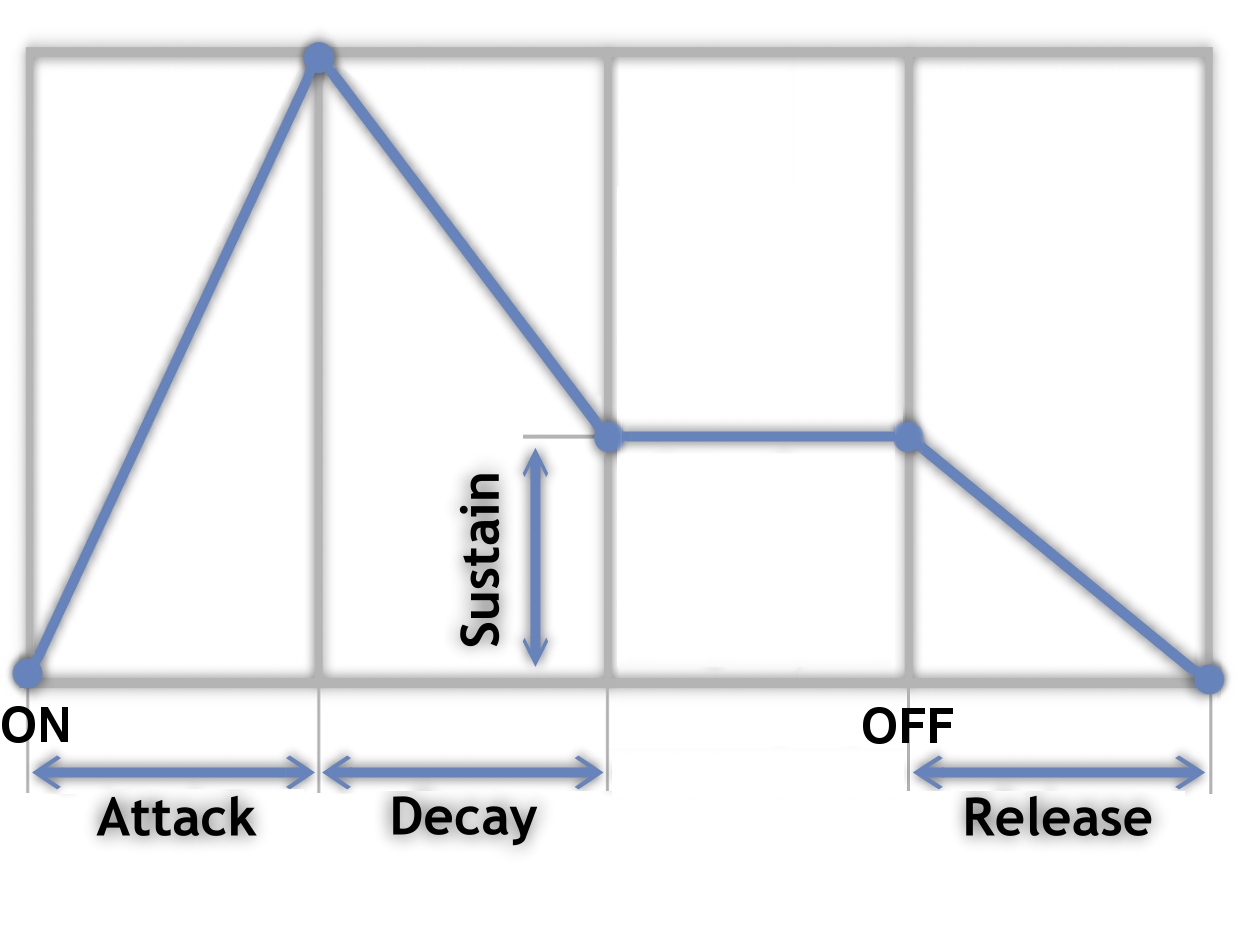
The ADSR envelope in music is the same model used to describe response in games.

Controls with little delay are often described as responsive, while noticeable delays can make the game feel sluggish or unwieldy. Responsive control is an important aspect of game feel, although games may intentionally deviate from this principle for particular design purposes.

The response of an input can change depending on how the affected parameters behave over time. The ADSR envelope, a concept adapted from music, can be used to describe how a change begins, settles, remains steady, and slows down across four phases. For example, a character that takes longer to reach full speed may feel loose or floaty, while a character that reaches full speed immediately may feel tight and responsive.

Response determines not only how quickly the game reacts to an input, but how that input is translated into movement and other actions. A simple input can produce a complex result when multiple parameters are affected by the same input or when the effects of an input change depending on the current state of the game. For example, the controller of Nintendo Entertainment System has a simple directional pad and two on-off buttons, but game such as Super Mario Bros. use these limited inputs to produce movement that can be fluid, deliberate, and varied.

=== Context ===
Input and response require an environment that gives meaning to the player's actions. If the player has the ability to move the character in interesting ways, the game environment should provide situations that allow those abilities to be used meaningfully.

For instance, a racing game that focuses on careful steering and managing speed around corners would not be engaging if the race track was a wide, straight line; a track with slopes, bends, straights, and hairpin turns creates interesting scenarios for the player to interact with.

Steve Swink categorizes context into three levels based on what they convey to the player:

- High-level context: The overall impression of the game world create by its space, movement, and scale. The size, placement, and movement of objects provide context that influences how players perceive the environment and the objects within it. Large and open spaces can create a sense of exploration and possibility, while enclosed spaces can create a sense of focus or claustrophobia. Similarly, the relative movement of objects can influence the perceived speed, size, and weight of those objects.
- Medium-level context: The immediate spatial arrangement of objects around the player, which affects how the player navigates and avoids obstacles. Closely spaced objects can make movement more challenging and require greater precision, while widely spaced objects can make navigation easier and less demanding.
- Low-level context: The physical interaction between the player and surrounding objects, particularly how collisions are modeled and perceived. The way objects collide, rebound, deform, or resist movement can create different tactile impressions. These interactions influence how responsive and physically tangible the game world feels.

=== Polish ===
Polish, also referred to as "aesthetics", is the additional details added to interactions between game elements to influence the player's perception of their physical properties. These details can make objects and their interactions feel more physical and tangible; however, they do not alter the underlying game mechanics.

Steve Swink identifies five types of polish used to portray the physical properties of an object:

==== Animation ====
Animation is the visual movement of an object that influences the player's perception of its physical properties. Whether an animation is considered good or bad is subjective and depends on the artist's or designer's intention: however, animators have established principles of animation as a baseline for creating natural-looking movement.

The squash and stretch applied to the bouncing ball in Picture B compared to the ball without it in Picture A.

For example, one of the principles of animation, called squash and stretch, can make an object appear softer, heavier, or more physically expressive. When animating a bouncing ball, squash and stretch can make the ball appear more elastic and emphasize its bouncing motion. Without it, the ball may appear stiff and fail to convey its intended physical properties. The same technique can be applied to objects that would not normally deform, such as a brick, to alter the player's perception. Although a brick is generally perceived as hard and rigid, applying squash and stretch can make it appear softer, or exaggerate the force of its impact.

==== Visual Effects ====
Visual aesthetics add details to the game world that make it feel more vibrant and connected. Visual details can subconsciously inform the player of the subtle interactions between the objects in the game world. Simple examples include adding particle effects, like dirt being kicked up by the game character's feet or water splashing from a pool, can enhance the inherent connection between physical objects in the game world.

Visual effects can also improve game feel by introducing extra spectacle and dazzling the player. Vivid colors and bright aesthetics can make a game feel alive, and adding effects like bright flashes, sparks, explosions, debris, and camera shake enhances the impact of events in the game.

==== Sound Effects ====
Sound effects emphasize the interactions between objects in the game. Having weak or quiet sound effects can lead to the game objects feeling weak and less impactful. If the sounds themselves are low quality, it can be especially distracting to the player. Good game feel requires appropriate, impactful, and pleasing (non-repetitive) sound effects.

Music can also have a big effect on game feel. Game music's main purpose is to reinforce the main mood or tone of the game. Action games generally use loud and bombastic scores to emphasize the feeling of power and triumph, and horror games generally use subtle, tense music with loud spikes to drive home moments of intensity.

==== Cinematic Effects ====
Cinematic effects are effects applied to the game's camera that influence the player's perception of an object's physical properties and movement. These effects can include screen shake, changes in view angle, motion blur, and slow motion. Because the camera represents the player's point of view, altering it can make an interaction appear more powerful or physically significant.

For example, screen shake following an explosion can make the impact appear more powerful, while slow motion when a character lands a powerful attack can emphasize the force of the impact.

==== Tactile Effects ====
Tactile effects are effects delivered through the player's input device that influence their physical perception of an interaction in order to provide physical sensation corresponding to events occurring in the game.

For example, in Ghost of Tsushima: Director's Cut on the PlayStation 5, the controller vibrates when the player pets an animal, simulating the sensation of purring and increasing immersion in the game.

=== Metaphor ===
Metaphor in game feel refers to how the game mechanics relate to the game's theme. If a game involves things the player understands, the player will bring preconceived notions of how those things should behave.

Steve Swink identifies metaphor as having two aspects: representation and treatment. Representation refers to what an object appears to be and the ideas associated with it, while treatment refers to the combination of elements that create its presentation, such as visual art, visual effects, and sound effects.

For instance, a realistic driving simulator represents its vehicle as a car, creating expectations of how a car should move and handle. Its treatment, such as realistic visuals, engine sounds, and other effects, reinforces these expectations. If the car model is replaced with a model of a fat running man without changing the control or movement, the representation changes while the underlying mechanics remain the same. As a result, the game feels completely different and the previous expectations are no longer present.

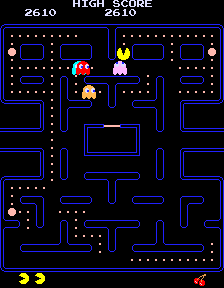
A gameplay screenshot of Pac-Man illustrating the threat of pursuing ghosts and a Power Pellet positioned at the top-right of the maze.

=== Rules ===
Rules, or game mechanics, are defined interactions between game elements designed for specific gameplay purposes. Without the context provided by the rules, these elements may appear unrelated to one another; however, the rules establish their relationships, which dictates how players interact with them.

For example, in Pac-Man, consuming a "Power Pellet" temporarily allows the player character to eat the enemy ghosts. This rule changes the player's tactical approach on these items, often leading them to strategically leave the pellets on the stage until needed, rather than consuming them immediately. Without this rule, the item would not alter player behavior or affect the perceived threat level of the enemies.

Steve Swink categorizes rules into three distinct levels based on how they affect gameplay:

- High-level rules: Rules that influence player behavior by incentivizing or restricting the use of specific subsets of mechanics, thereby guiding strategic choices within the gameplay system.

For example, in multiplayer online battle arena (MOBA) games, the "last-hitting" mechanic awards additional gold to the player character who delivers the final blow to a minion or creep. This rule incentivizes players to time their attacks precisely rather than continuously using abilities and basic attacks without strategy.

- Mid-level rules: Rules that target specific active game objects, temporarily shifting the player's immediate priorities and altering the sequence of their actions.

For example, in multiplayer online battle arena (MOBA) games, defensive towers often receive a significant armor reduction when enemy minions or creeps enter their radius, making the structures vulnerable to player attacks. This mechanic functions as a mid-level rule that instantly shifts the defending team's immediate priority from other map objectives to clearing the enemy creeps and protecting the tower.

- Low-level rules: Rules that determine the traits and behavior of a single object, altering how players perceive it.

For example, in multiplayer online battle arena (MOBA) games, standard minions or creeps travel in groups and are defeated in a few attacks, causing players to perceive them as minor, low-value encounters. In contrast, major jungle monsters or bosses appear individually on the map with significantly higher health and defense pools. Although the player's attack mechanics remain identical, the high number of strikes required to defeat these unique monsters alters player perception, making the encounters feel much more intimidating and valuable.

== Principles of Game feel ==
Game feel is subjective. Different designers and authors may interpret the term and its principles differently. Some authors group game feel design by intent. Pichlmair and Johansen describe three domains: tuning the physicality of objects, amplifying the importance of events, and supporting the player's intent. For example, coyote time supports the player by allowing a jump a short time after running off a ledge. Bhatnagar and colleagues argue that game feel can also be designed for negative emotions such as struggle, as in the blizzard of Journey and the wind of Celeste.

Steve Swink's framework includes seven principles for creating good game feel, which are compared to the principles of animation: Predictable results, Instantaneous response, Easy but deep, Novelty, Appealing response, Organic motion, and Harmony.

== Game feel in Physical Media ==
Game feel is not exclusive to video games. Physical games such as board games also have a feel, which come from touching and handling real objects. In a study of how players imagine interacting with game components, the most common actions were moving, touching, rolling die, and manipulating components.

In video games, physical properties are created through code and polish, while in physical games, they come from the components themselves. Sensory elements such as audio and moving visuals are traditionally absent from board games. A research found that the players considered board games to lacked of sensory input.

Analogue-digital hybrid boardgames combine physical components with a digital element. For example, in the new version of Dark Tower, players drop skulls into a physical tower to trigger events in an app, an in Beasts of Balance, stacking animal-shaped pieces creates new beasts in the app.

== Sources ==
- Pichlmair, Martin; Johansen, Mads (18 November 2020). "Designing Game Feel: A Survey". IEEE Transactions on Games. 14 (2): 138–152. arXiv:2011.09201. Bibcode:2022ITGam..14..138P. doi:10.1109/TG.2021.3072241.
- Sweetser, Penelope; Wyeth, Peta (2005). "GameFlow: a model for evaluating player enjoyment in games". Computers in Entertainment. 3 (3). Association for Computing Machinery: 3. doi:10.1145/1077246.1077253.
