= Joystick Nation =

1997 book by J.C. Herz

Joystick Nation is a 1997 book written by J.C. Herz.

== Contents ==
Joystick Nation is a book in which an authoritative history of the video game medium is offered, shaped by the author and her lifelong immersion in gaming culture.

== Reception ==
Pyramid called Herz "highly literate and techno-savvy" after highlighting her "Game Theory" column in The New York Times, and called Joystick Nation "the most lively history of videogames that has yet to appear on the market".

Anita Hamilton for Time said that "Joystick Nation offers more than enough wisdom, humor and insight to make it an engaging treatise on how video games have moved beyond the kiddie arcades and into the cultural fabric of modern society."

Edge was more critical and said that "The fact that Joystick Nation has received frothy praise from mainstream-media reviewers serves only to underline how little those outside of the industry understand the medium. Herz's effort had the potential to be à tool of enlightenment to those individuals, but it falls way short of the mark. The ghastly Eighties cover artwork should be enough to put anyone of."

Computer and Video Games was more complimentary, stating that "If you want to know more about where we're coming from definitely read Joystick Nation by JC Herz. This is an easy-going book with great humour, detailing everything from the first computer to where we are now. Best of all it's from а gamer's perspective. Better than that, you should see the gamer."

Patrick Wong for Classic Gamer Magazine said that "If Joystick Nation were to have another name, it would be 'JoyPad Nation.' As much of a history and sociology lesson the book may be, it doesn't explore the old Atari games nearly enough. You can't talk about Asteriods, Pac-Man and Space Invaders before some link to Doom, Myst and Mortal Kombat is formed. There's a continued blurring of arcade and video games to computer games that's likely to continue. It used to be so easy to talk about Atari games and not have to bring up PC games. Herz's Joystick Nation blurs the picture even more."
