= Smartbomb (book) =

2005 book by Heather Chaplin and Aaron Ruby

Smartbomb: The Quest for Art, Entertainment, and Big Bucks in the Videogame Revolution
- Author: Heather Chaplin; Aaron Ruby
- Genre: Non-fiction
- Publisher: Algonquin Books
- Publication date: November 4, 2005
- ISBN: 1-56512-346-8 (hardcover)

Smartbomb: The Quest for Art, Entertainment, and Big Bucks in the Videogame Revolution is a book written by journalists Heather Chaplin and Aaron Ruby. It was published on November 4, 2005, by Algonquin Books. It is the authors' first book and the work of five years of research.

The last chapter chronicles how the PlayStation 2 threatened Microsoft with upcoming multimedia and personal computer appliances promised in the post-PC era. According with this book, the Xbox console was the Microsoft's step to break Sony in a market that nobody imagined that a traditional software company would to enter. The book says that Bill Gates "was becoming increasingly frustrated by Sony's success in the videogames market see Sony’s PlayStation was already outselling the top five PC makers combined".

== See also ==
- List of books on computer and video games
