= Phoenix IV: The History of the Videogame Industry =

Book by Leonard Herman

Phoenix
- Author: Leonard Herman
- Subject: History of videogames
- Publisher: Rolenta Press
- Publication date: November 2016
- ISBN: 978-1539031291
- OCLC: 995329302

Phoenix IV: The History of the Videogame Industry is a book written by Leonard Herman. It is the fourth edition of a book that had been previously called Phoenix: The Fall & Rise of Videogames. The original book had been published in December 1994 by Rolenta Press and at the time of its publication, Phoenix was the first-ever comprehensive book about the history of videogames. Two subsequent editions were released: the 2nd edition arrived in 1997 and a 3rd edition was published in 2001. The book has been completely rewritten and the 4th edition was published in November, 2016. In June 2008, Game Informer magazine named Phoenix the second best videogame-related book of all time.

Phoenix follows a chronological approach to the history of videogames. Nearly every chapter represents one year (with the exception of Chapter 1, which covers the years 1947 through 1970, Chapter 2, which represents the years 1970–1972, and Chapter 4, which is about the years 1974-1976).

Herman began writing the book in 1987 and his intention was for it to be published by 1992, the twentieth anniversary of videogames. Several publishers, including Prima Games, rejected the book on the grounds that the videogame industry was still too new for anyone to be interested in a detailed history of it. After Herman mentioned the book in a letter printed in the fanzine, 2600 Connection, readers of the fanzine wrote to him asking for copies. Herman decided to release it as a photocopied booklet, joined by staples. Fifty copies of this 'Preview' edition were printed and sent to videogame fanzines and magazines. Following a favorable mention by Chris Johnston in the August 1994 issue of EGM², Herman decided to self-publish the book and founded Rolenta Press in order to do so.

On May 1, 2012, Herman announced that the 4th edition would be published by No Starch Press in late 2013. That deal was severed in 2015 due to differences between the author and the publisher about the direction the book was going. Two other major publishers had expressed interest in publishing the 4th edition but in the end, Herman decided to have Rolenta Press publish it.

For the 4th edition, the name of the book has been changed to Phoenix IV: The History of the Videogame Industry. Delays in writing caused the publication to be in November, 2016. A Kindle edition was released on April 3, 2017. A deluxe hardcover color edition, which also included a 2016 chapter, was published on July 15, 2017.

== Editions ==
- Preview Edition - January 1994 - History through 1991
- 1st Edition - December 1994 - History through 1993
- 2nd Edition - September 1997 - Three printings - History through 1996. This edition was the first to include black & white photos. Foreword by Keith Feinstein.
- 3rd Edition - June, 2001 - Eleven printings through October 2014 - History through 2000. Foreword by Ralph Baer. The first four printings of this edition were in a large 8.5 x 11 format. The book went out of print in 2005 and was unavailable for several years because the publisher believed that the fourth edition was imminent. In October, 2009, it was apparent that the 4th edition wasn't going to be published any time soon, so a new printing of the 3rd edition was made available. The new printing was reduced to a 6x9 size, but otherwise contained the same text as the prior printings. The tenth and eleventh printings featured a new cover by Michael Thomasson and Cory Golabek.
- 4th Edition - November, 2016 - History through 2015. Forewords by Ted Dabney and Chris Kohler. The cover is very similar to the one designed by Michael Thomasson and Cory Golabek that was used in the tenth and eleventh printings of the 3rd edition. Originally, this cover had been designed for the 4th edition, until No Starch Press said they weren't going to use it. The book contains 828 pages and includes 1,028 pictures.
- 4th Edition - Kindle Edition - April, 2017. This is an expanded version of the 4th edition that has corrected errors found in the B&W edition. These errors are listed on the Rolenta Press website. .
- 4th Edition - Deluxe Hardcover Color Edition - July, 2017. This is an expanded version of the 4th edition that has corrected errors found in the B&W edition. These errors are listed on the Rolenta Press website. This edition also includes a separate chapter on 2016 and an index of illustrations. The book contains 868 pages and 1,054 color illustrations.

== Reception ==
Reviewing the second edition, Next Generation commented that "Author Leonard Herman may not win any prizes for his prose - it's workmanlike, even wooden at times - but the amount of data he's collected means that Phoenix should be considered a must-read for anyone interested in videogames." They noted that the second edition fixed some errors, added photos, and was set in a more legible font than the first edition.

Phoenix has received favorable reviews and mentions from many magazines including Electronic Games, Electronic Gaming Monthly, Wired, Edge, GamePro, Game Informer, and Next Generation. In fact, following the release of the 2nd edition, Next Generation publisher Jonathan Simpson-Bint and Herman were in discussions about Simpson-Bint's company, Imagine Media, taking over the publishing of subsequent editions of Phoenix. Nothing ever came out of these discussions.

== See also ==
- List of books on computer and video games
