= Trigger Happy (book) =

Book by Steven Poole

- Author: Stephen Poole
- Publication date: 2000
- ISBN: 978-1559705981

Trigger Happy is a book by English writer Steven Poole published in 2000 examining the history and aesthetic appeal of videogames. It explores what makes certain games more fun to play than others. It covers aspects such as the effective use of space and perspective in videogames, rewards and progression through games, the design of an appealing video game character and the debate over violence in games.

In different editions (published by Fourth Estate (ISBN 1-84115-121-1) and Arcade Publishing (ISBN 1-55970-598-1), it has had the subtitles The Inner Life of Videogames and Videogames and the Entertainment Revolution.

Trigger Happy was released for free in pdf format under a Creative Commons license in 2007. The book may be downloaded from the author's website.

== Reception ==
A review in New Statesman said that Poole "has mused upon the principles underpinning the various games and has provided a clear account of his conclusions. Not only a clear account, in fact, but a warm and highly readable story of his journey into the soul of video games."

== See also ==
- Video game studies
- List of books on computer and video games
