= Tracy Fullerton =

American game designer, educator and writer

- Tracy Fullerton in 2013
- Born: June 21, 1965 (age 61); Los Angeles, California, US
- Education: USC School of Cinematic Arts, Los Angeles
- Known for: Game Design
- Notable work: The Night Journey (2007); Walden, a game (2017)
- Awards: Indiecade Trailblazer 2013; Games for Change Game Changer 2015; Games for Change Game of the Year 2017 (Walden, a game); Games for Change Most Significant Impact 2017 (Walden, a game)
- Website: www.tracyfullerton.com

Tracy Fullerton (born June 21, 1965) is an American game designer, educator and writer, best known for Walden, a game (2017). She is a Professor in the USC Interactive Media & Games Division of the USC School of Cinematic Arts and Director of the Game Innovation Lab at USC.

== Biography ==
Fullerton earned a B.A. in Theatre Arts from the University of California, Santa Cruz in 1988, followed by an M.F.A in Cinema-Television Production from the University of Southern California in 1991. She worked as a writer and designer for Robert Abel's company Synapse, then was Creative Director at the interactive film studio Interfilm. At Interfilm, she wrote and co-directed the "cinematic game" Ride for Your Life (1995), which starred Adam West and Matthew Lillard. After that film, she worked as a producer and creative director at the New York design firm R/GA Interactive. While there, she created games and interactive products, including Sony's Multiplayer Jeopardy! and Multiplayer Wheel of Fortune and MSN's NetWits, an early multiplayer casual game launched in 1996. Starting in 1998, she was president and co-founder of the interactive television game developer, Spiderdance, Inc. Spiderdance's games included NBC's Weakest Link, MTV's webRIOT, The WB's No Boundaries, History Channel's History IQ, Sony Game Show Network's Inquizition and TBS's Cyber Bond.

In 2004, Fullerton joined the faculty at the University of Southern California, as an Assistant Professor in the School of Cinematic Arts, Interactive Media Division. There, she became the co-director of the USC Game Innovation Lab. She also published her first book, Game Design Workshop, in 2004, which has been released as a fifth edition in 2024. In 2008, Fullerton became the Electronic Arts Endowed Chair of Interactive Entertainment at USC. From 2010 to 2017, she served as Chair of the USC Interactive Media & Games Division. In 2014 she was named Director of the USC Games Program, an interdisciplinary collaboration between the School of Cinematic Arts and the Viterbi School of Engineering at USC.

Fullerton served as a faculty advisor for the award-winning student games Cloud (2005) and flOw (2006). She also contributed to Reality Ends Here, a pervasive game which ran at USC from 2011 to 2014. She was a game designer for The Night Journey (2007-2018), a game/art project in production with media artist Bill Viola, and Participation Nation (2008), a game to teach Constitutional history produced in collaboration with KCET and Activision.

Fullerton's work has received numerous industry honors including an Emmy nomination for interactive television, best Family/Board Game from the Academy of Interactive Arts & Sciences, I.D. Magazine's Interactive Design Review, Communication Arts Interactive Design Annual, several New Media Invision awards, iMix Best of Show, the Digital Coast Innovation Award, IBC's Nombre D'Or, Time Magazine's Best of the Web, IndieCade's Festival of Independent Games, The Hollywood Reporter's Women in Entertainment Power 100 and Fortune's 10 Powerful Women in Videogames.

Fullerton appeared in Danny Ledonne's documentary Playing Columbine (2008).

She is the cousin to Charlotte Fullerton.

== Walden, a game ==
In Walden, a game, Tracy Fullerton designed a conceptual, experiential game that simulates the philosophy of living the simplified experience articulated by Transcendental author, Henry David Thoreau. It puts Thoreau's ideas about life into playable form. The game exemplifies Fullerton's design methods, where she encourages designers to find inspiration in ideas and activities that have meaning to them and then see where that leads rather than rely on standard genres and design solutions. The project was supported by a media arts grant from the National Endowment for the Arts, one of the first video game projects to be awarded such a grant, as well as the National Endowment for the Humanities. Walden, a game was released on Itch.io on July 4, 2017 and subsequently named Game of the Year and Most Significant Impact at the 2017 Games for Change awards.

== Writings ==
- Fullerton, Tracy. Game Design Workshop: A Playcentric Approach to Creating Innovative Games. A K Peters/CRC Press, 2018. ISBN 978-1-138-09877-0

== Awards ==
- Game of the Year and Most Significant Impact for Walden, a game at Games for Change 2017
- Ambassador Award at Game Developers Choice Awards 2016
- Game Changer award at Games for Change 2015
- Trailblazer award at IndieCade 2013
- Impact award for Reality Ends Here at IndieCade 2012 (game designer)
- Sublime Experience award for The Night Journey at IndieCade 2008 (game designer)
- Time's Best of the Web
