= Deborah Todd =

American screenwriter

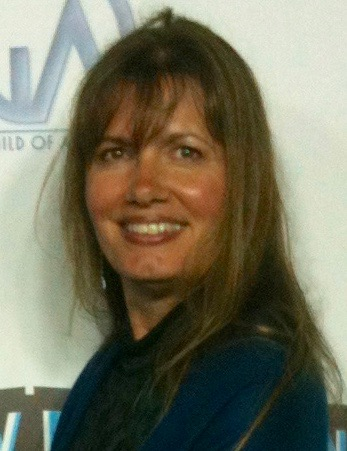
- Deborah Todd at the 2015; Producers Guild Awards in Los Angeles
- Education: Johns Hopkins University (MA); Indiana University (BS)
- Occupations: Writer, designer, producer
- Years active: 1991–present

Deborah Todd is an American game designer, writer, and producer who began her career in the entertainment industry in 1991 writing cartoons for MGM/UA's new Pink Panther Saturday morning cartoon series. She is known for her pioneering work in children's interactive media, and as one of the first women game designer-writers in the industry, working with many of the early video game icons including Ron Gilbert and Humongous Entertainment, Broderbund, the Discovery Channel, Disney Interactive, 20th Century Fox, Houghton Mifflin Interactive, McGraw Hill, Warner Bros., and the Starlight Children's Foundation.

She is a member of the IGDA, the National Association of Science Writers, the Writers Guild of America, west, the Academy of Television Arts & Sciences, and the Producers Guild of America, where she served for seven years as a New Media Council Board Delegate.

Todd is also the author of several books including an algebra book, an astronomy book, and the industry book Game Design: From Blue Sky to Green Light, with a foreword by producer Jon Landau (Avatar, Alita: Battle Angel).

== Television and video games ==
Todd's early career began in the Hanna-Barbera animation writing program. Within months of graduating from the program she made her first sale to MGM, writing for the Metro-Goldwyn-Mayer Animation Saturday morning cartoon series The Pink Panther, featuring the voice of Matt Frewer. Her television and children's writing background paved the way to write, design, and produce her first game, an interactive storybook for the Discovery Channel based on the children's television show Professor Iris. Her next two projects were with Gilbert at Humongous Entertainment, writing two of the three Junior Field Trips titles. She returned years later to work with Humongous again, this time on the Blue's Clues 1-2-3 Time early math game in conjunction with Nickelodeon.

Todd was the writer of the first Curious George CD-ROM, Curious George Comes Home, which was honored with the ABA Book Seller's Choice New Media Award, and the ComputEd Best Interactive Story Award. Todd's other children's titles include the Anastasia CD-ROM game released in conjunction with the Anastasia animated feature by 20th Century Fox, and Disney's 101 Dalmatians: Escape from DeVil Manor released with the live-action feature starring Glenn Close. Todd's Dalmatians game is also featured in the lyrics of Will Smith's "Just the Two of Us," a top 20 Billboard Hot 100 hit that reached number 2 in the UK Singles chart, and top 10 on the Billboard 200 with his album Big Willy Style (1997).

In addition to young children's titles, Todd created projects designed specifically for the teen market. A computer-based training project for new drivers, created with Adept Driving, has been in use since 1995. It is currently the American Automobile Association TeenSmart Driving Course, which claims the product has resulted in a decrease in the crash rates of 16- to 19-year-olds by 30%.

She also created three teen-centric online games for the National Endowment for Financial Education, and wrote Grade Builder: Algebra 1 for The Learning Company, which won a U.S. News & World Report Top 12 Titles of the Year award. Other projects within the Serious Games segment of the industry include an Astronomy reference title for software publisher Mindscape, and MyBrainGames, a cognitive exercise game for Multiple Sclerosis patients.

Another serious game written, produced, and directed by Todd was a First-person shooter entitled The Monkey Wrench Conspiracy, designed to teach engineers how to use 3D CAD software. This game was developed in conjunction with the CEO of think3, Joseph Costello, and learning expert Marc Prensky, best known for coining the terms "digital native" and "digital immigrant." The company shipped more than 1 million copies of the game. It was a little known fact that the voice of the computer in the game is Todd's, who recorded at the urging of Costello.

Todd immersed herself in the world of MMOG's as producer, designer, and writer of MiniMonos with the New Zealand developer/publisher of the same name. The game, for children aged 6–12, has an underlying theme of sustainability, with NPCs (non-player characters) and mini-games that play cooperatively with each other. The game's narrative places the island of MiniMonos in the heart of the Bermuda Triangle, where highly evolved monkeys – the NPCs and player avatars – play together and take care of their portion of the planet. The game was released from Beta on April 1, 2011, and achieved over 1 million registered users by its one-year anniversary. It also launched a full-page comic series in April 2012, written by Todd, in the UK's #1 boys periodical, Toxic.

In 2014, Todd worked with Disney a third time, as writer on its first Facebook game, City Girl. This casual game became the third of Todd's titles to reach the one-million-users mark.

Astra presented Todd with its 2016 President's Award, honoring her contributions as a "Creative Leader of Connectivity." Todd is a founding board member of the Girls S.T.E.A.M. Institute, along with Bernstein, Edwards, and colleague Megan Gaiser. Todd previously worked with Gaiser and Her Interactive on a Nancy Drew mobile project.

== Education ==
Todd holds a Master of Arts in Science Writing from Johns Hopkins University. She is a graduate of the Zanvyl Krieger School of Arts and Sciences prestigious Writing Seminars.

Todd received her undergraduate degree, a Bachelor of Science in business, from Indiana University with a double major in Marketing and Management & Administration.

== Publications ==
Game Design: From Blue Sky to Green Light was published in 2007 by A K Peters (acquired in 2010 by CRC Press). Game Design was a Frontline Award finalist and named one of the top five industry books of 2007 by the video game industry periodical Game Developer.

Todd is also the author of Algebra Handbook, and lead author of The A to Z of Scientists in Space and Astronomy, both published by the Infobase Publishing imprint Facts on File.

=== Published books ===
| Title | Publisher |
|---|---|
| Palliative Care: A Holistic Approach to Life-Limiting Disease | Reimagine Well 2019; By Deborah Todd, Roger Holzberg, Adele Sender |
| Game Design: From Blue Sky to Green Light | AK Peters 2007 (CRC Press); Game Developer Front Line Awards Top 5 Industry Books of the Year |
| Enhanced WebAssign | Thomson Higher Education 2007 (Cengage) |
| Smart Start Guide for Students | Thomson Higher Education 2006 (Cengage) |
| Smart Start Guide for Instructors | Thomson Higher Education 2006 (Cengage) |
| A to Z of Scientists in Space & Astronomy | Facts on File 2005; Lead writer; co-author Joe DiAngelo. |
| Algebra Handbook | Facts on File 2003 |

Video Games and Television

Todd has written, designed, and produced more than two dozen published titles across platforms and genres, on topics ranging from 3D CAD to sustainability, biology, astronomy, algebra, logic, and early-learning math and reading, plus pure entertainment.

=== Produced Titles ===
| Title | Publisher | Extra Information |
|---|---|---|
| Top Secret Googly Project | Google | Executive Producer Rachel Bernstein |
| MiniMonos | MiniMonos | MMOG, Mobile, Comics, Cards, 1 million+ users |
| Disney's City Girl | Disney/Playdom | Facebook Casual Game, 1 million+ users |
| Blue's 123 Time Activities | Nickelodeon / Humongous Entertainment | Early learning math game of critical acclaim, based on the popular children's television series. ComputEd's 1999/00 Best Educational Software (BESSIE) Award for Math, and Parent's Choice Gold Award. |
| 101 Dalmatians: Escape from DeVil Manor | Disney Interactive | Adventure puzzle game released with “101 Dalmatians,” the 1996 live action feature |
| Winnie the Pooh’s Interactive Adventure | Disneyland | Theme park attraction |
| Anastasia: Adventures with Pooka and Bartok | Fox Interactive | Simultaneous release with “Anastasia,” the 1997 animated feature |
| Curious George Comes Home | Houghton-Mifflin Interactive | First ever “Curious George” interactive title, this classic features prop-driven gameplay and a printable storybook/coloring book of the child's adventures with George. ABA Book Sellers Choice New Media Award; ComputEd Best Interactive Story Award |
| BioArcade: Lifeboat to Mars | PBS Kids Online/Redhill Studios | Mod-able biology-based games, more than 10,000 new levels uploaded by kids |
| Where in Time is Carmen Sandiego | Brøderbund | Story consultant with Ken Goldstein |
| Professor Iris' Animal Safari | Discovery Channel | Children's interactive storybook based on The Learning Channel's series Iris, The Happy Professor |
| The Monkey Wrench Conspiracy | Think3/Corp Gameware | FPS sci-fi action adventure serious game, to teach engineers how to design in 3D CAD. Winner of the Northern California Society for Technical Communications Distinguished Award. 1 million+ users. |
| Grade Builder: Algebra 1 | The Learning Company | U.S. News & World Report Top 12 Titles of the Year Award |
| Guide to Multimedia | Asymetrix | Reference title |
| Junior Field Trips Let's Explore the Airport | Random House / Humongous Entertainment | Kids First Award; Parenting Magazine Software Magic Award; Child Magazine Best Software of the Year Award; Early Childhood Education Journal Best Development Software Award |
| Junior Field Trips Let's Explore the Farm | Random House / Humongous Entertainment | |
| Reader Rabbit | The Learning Company | Consultant |
| My Brain Games | Multiple Sclerosis Association / Redhill Studios | Cognitive serious game for MS patients, played more than 200,000 times in the first year |
| Buying a Car | National Endowment for Financial Education | Serious online game for teens |
| Good Credit | National Endowment for Financial Education | Serious online game for teens |
| Job Hunt | National Endowment for Financial Education | Serious online game for teens |
| The Universe Beyond | Mindscape | Astronomy reference title |
| TeenSmart Driving | Adept Driving | AAA (American Automobile Association) serious game CBT, program results in up to 30% fewer teen crashes |
| Read-It | Soliloquy Learning | Serious game, ESL |
| Baseball | Caps Software | Early-learning reading title |
| Fantastic Math Journey | CCC | Early-learning math game |
| Rocketon | Rocketon | Avatar site migration |
| NTT | Nippon Telephone and Telegraph | Avatar and environments |
| The Pink Panther | MGM/UA | Saturday morning animated television series |
