= Christina Norman =

American media executive

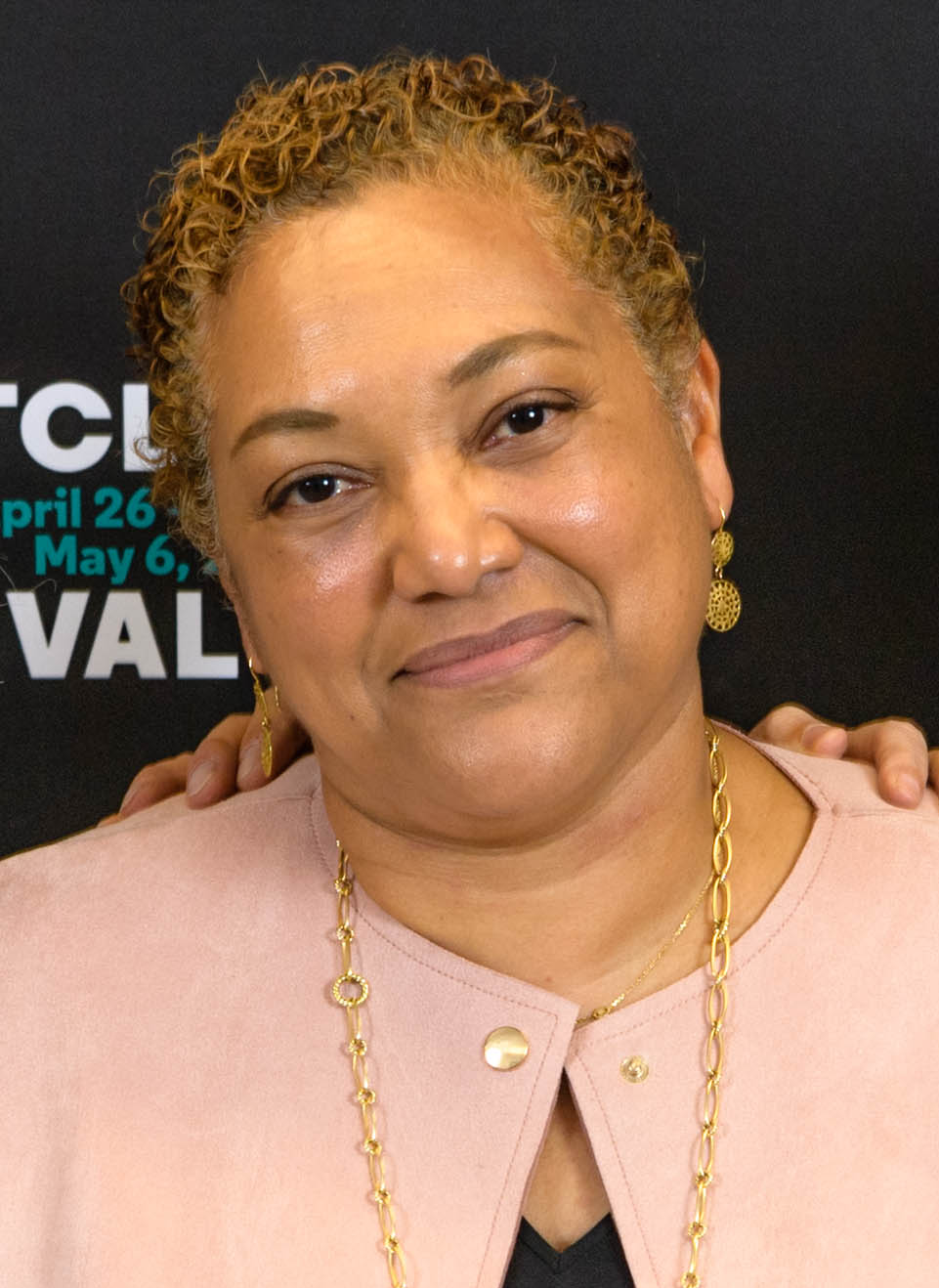
Christina Norman in The Future Of Television; Photography by Neil Grabowsky / Montclair Film in 2018

Christina Norman is an American media executive and producer.

A native of New York City, Norman was born to musical parents and grew up in the Bronx and Queens before receiving a degree in film production from Boston University, and until 1991 worked as an agent in the field of television advertising. She next moved to MTV, rising through the company until she held, variously, the ranks of production manager, senior vice president for marketing, and executive vice president. Appointed senior manager of VH1, she became that channel's president in January 2004, and at once set about making changes. Series which she accepted for production include I Love the 80s, Bands Reunited, Best Week Ever, and Rock Behind Bars, all of which led to an increase in ratings for the network. She oversaw the launch of MTV2 and MTV Tres, and the growth of mtvU, as well. She left MTV in 2007. Norman has also served as executive director of the Oprah Winfrey Network and worked as head of content for the National Basketball Players Association's Think450.
