= Pilgrim in the Microworld =

1983 book by David Sudnow

- Author: David Sudnow
- Subject: Video games
- Genre: Case studies
- Publisher: Warner Books
- Publication date: 1983
- Pages: 161
- ISBN: 0-446-51261-3

Pilgrim in the Microworld is an analysis book on the arcade game Breakout by David Sudnow.

== Overview ==
David Sudnow was a sociologist professor at the University of California system, winner of the Guggenheim Fellowship in 1979 and piano teacher. He discovered Breakout while picking up his son at an arcade facility and began playing the Atari 2600 version of the game for months. For the book, Sudnow visited manufacturer Atari and interviewed the game's programmers.

== Publication ==
Pilgrim in the Microworld was originally published in 1983 by Warner Books.

Boss Fight Books crowdfunded a reprint with a new foreword and copy editing on Kickstarter in 2019.

== Reception ==
The New York Times stated the book's style to be breathless, but criticized the lack of analysis of how the game fits into broader "computer society". Kirkus Reviews stated it might be self-indulgence and written like a personal experience. San Francisco Examiner found the book "exhilarating". Newsweek ridiculed it, stating to read the game's manual and changing the money for the book into quarters to play Breakout instead.

Kill Screen wrote a retrospective on the book in 2013, comparing it to 1982's Invasion of the Space Invaders. In 2020, Unwinnable noted that Sudnow looked at music as a reference point for the book.
