= Thralled =

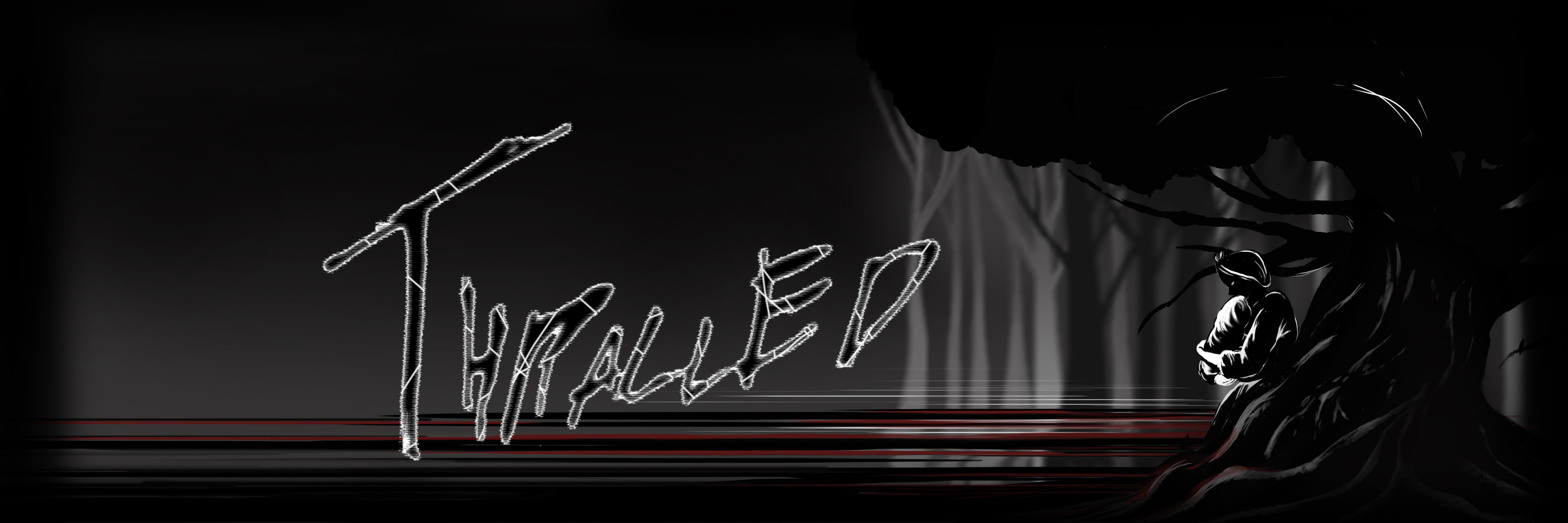
- Director: Miguel Oliveira
- Producer: Tiffanie Mang
- Platforms: Microsoft Windows, OS X, Ouya
- Genres: Platform, puzzle
- Mode: Single-player

Thralled is a platform puzzle video game about an 18th-century runaway slave and her baby escaping the Portuguese slave trade. The game began as a senior project in the USC Interactive Media & Games Division and later became an Ouya exclusive after being discovered by Kellee Santiago.

== Gameplay ==
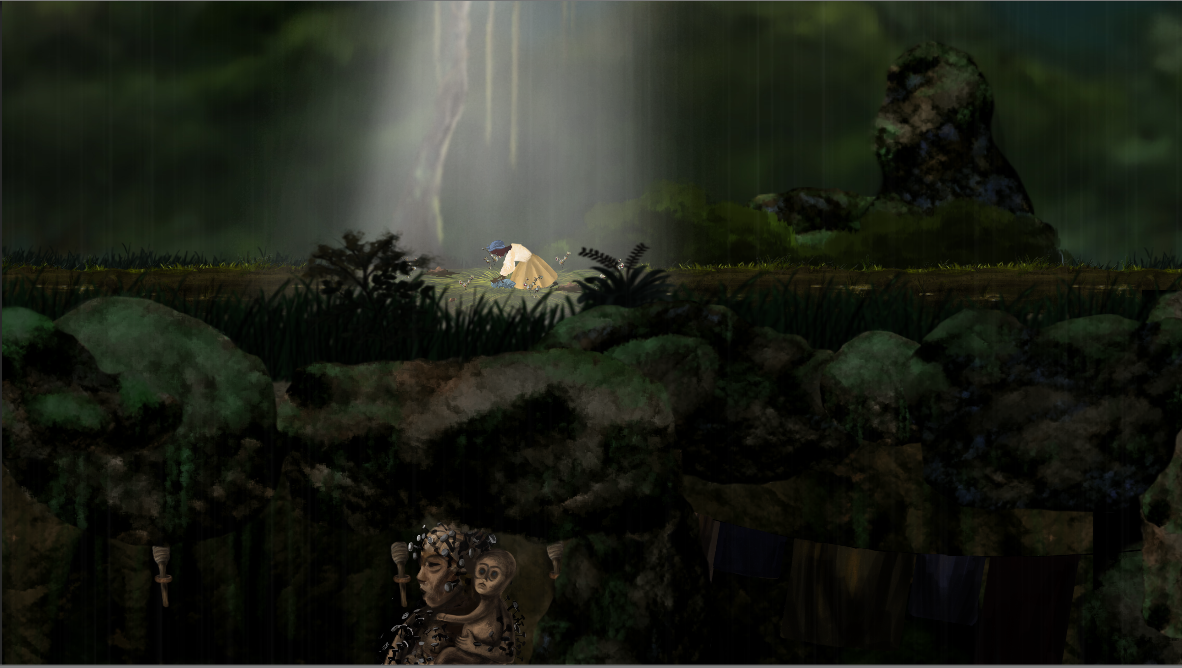
Screenshot of gameplay from the game

Thralled is a side-scrolling platform and puzzle game where the player-character is a runaway slave mother escaping the Portuguese slave trade with her baby. The runaway slave, Isaura, escapes from a sugarcane plantation in 18th-century Brazil to find her missing child. She travels through Congo jungles and "colonial New World", and confronts the pains of losing her child and own past. While pursuing freedom and in fear of being caught and returned, she completes puzzles that include moving carts and cutting rope-bridges while temporarily relinquishing the baby. When the baby is placed down to move objects and cross chasms, a dark apparition version of the main character appears and approaches to take the baby. Settings include the plantation, a slave ship, and a castle that stores slaves for trade. The game has no dialogue, so Isaura expresses herself through movement. The game is played through a sole action button which either comforts the baby or interacts with the environment.

== Development ==
Thralled debuted in mid 2013. It started as a student project by creative director Miguel Oliveira and his peers at the University of Southern California Interactive Media & Games Division— Oliveira's senior thesis. He and animator Tiffanie Mang continued the project after their graduation and planned an iOS release. When Ouya developer relations head Kellee Santiago saw the game, she approached the developers about a deal: funding in exchange for exclusivity. They agreed, and the agreement funded the new development company. The game was shown at the March 2014 Game Developers Conference's Ouya booth and in the IndieCade section at E3 2014. Early feedback said that the game was too difficult, which hurt the level of "tension" upon trying again.

The mother and child element was chosen to "universalize" the horrors of slavery—that the latter could be made easier to understand through the former. The conceit was also a way to not focus on the violence of the era, which Oliveira said he could not accurately or comfortably depict. Thralled is also partially to humanize the tens of millions in modern slavery worldwide. Oliveira has said that he thought the video game medium was young and should be pushed further, as well as that the interactive medium has endless possibilities for self-expression of "intimacy", for broaching hard topics, and for empathizing with victims. He felt that most games focus on "primitive", animal feelings—"aggressiveness and competitiveness"—and was interested in empathetic and humanizing games that focus on "love and caring". The idea of the shadow figure that pursues the unaccompanied baby descends from a Congolese idea of the dead's world as parallel and reverse to ours, as viewable through reflections in bodies of water and mirrors. The developers also integrated their research on period Congolese and Brazilian culture into the game.

It was expected for release in 2016. The developers previously had no plans to release on other platforms and had not said whether the game is a timed exclusive, though Polygon reported that it was one. This changed in 2015 when a PC, Linux, and Mac version was confirmed.

== Reception ==
Pre-release reception praised the game's artwork and concept. Polygon's Colin Campbell called the game "emotionally challenging" when citing the baby's cries and Isaura's conspicuous fears. He noted that its gameplay and Ouya exclusivity were likely weak spots. The "chilling experience" made Kotaku's Evan Narcisse cry. He said the game made him consider the lengths to which he would go for his own daughter's betterment. Director of antislavery organization Walk Free Debra Rosen praised the game for its role in raising awareness about modern slavery.
