= Chris Swain =

Chris Swain may refer to:

- Chris Swain (game designer), American game designer, entrepreneur, and professor
- Chris Swain (soccer), retired American soccer goalkeeper
