= Jenova Chen =

Chinese video game designer

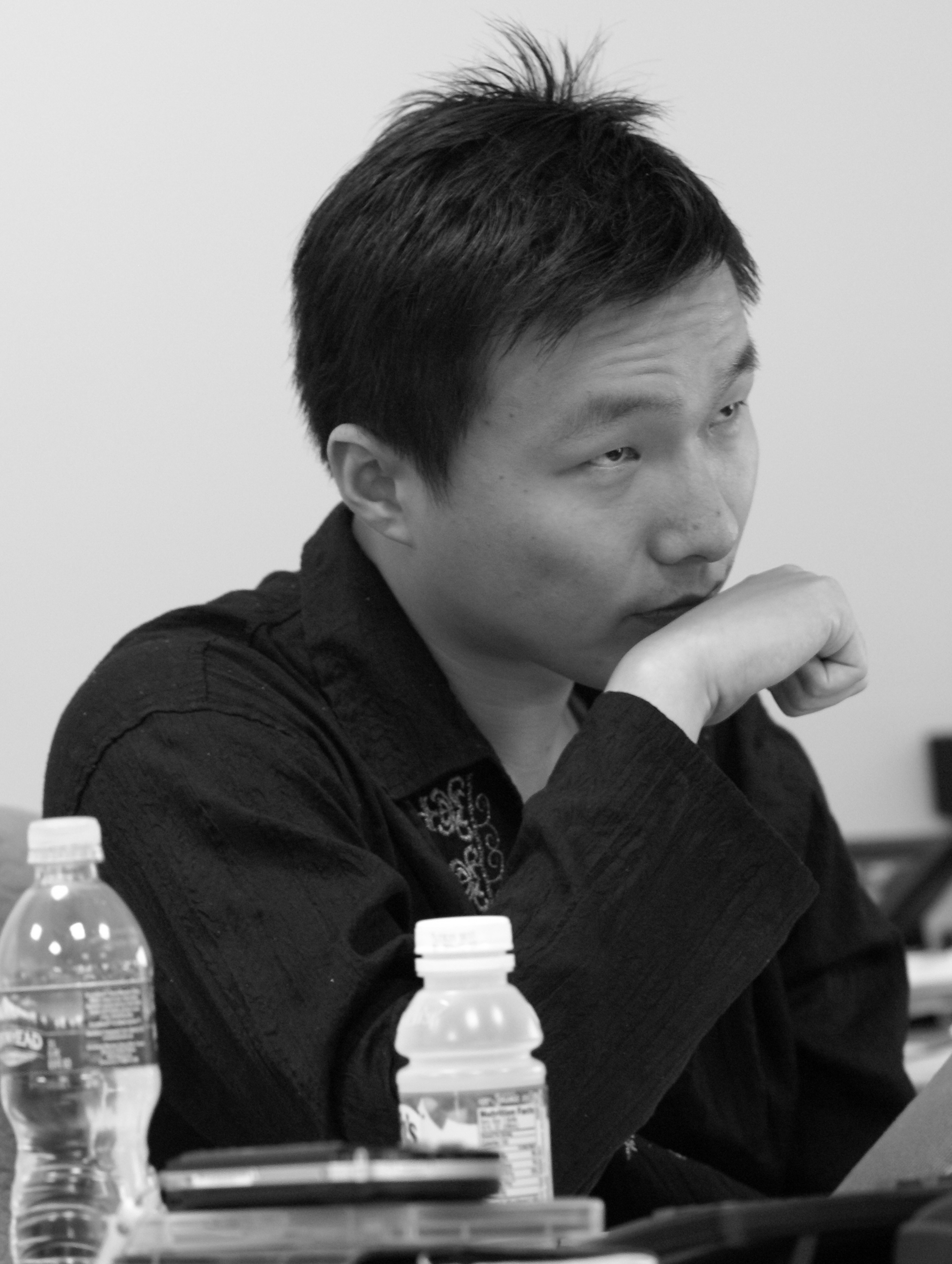
- Chen in 2007
- Born: Xinghan Chen; October 8, 1981 (age 45); Shanghai, China
- Education: Shanghai Jiao Tong University (BS); University of Southern California (MFA)
- Occupation: Video game designer
- Known for: Thatgamecompany
- Notable work: Cloud, Flow, Flower, Journey, Sky: Children of the Light
- Website: jenovachen.info

Jenova Chen
- Simplified Chinese: 陈星汉
- Traditional Chinese: 陳星漢
Transcriptions
Standard Mandarin
- Hanyu Pinyin: Chén Xīnghàn
- IPA: [ʈʂʰə̌n ɕíŋ.xân]

Xinghan Chen (Chinese: 陈星汉; pinyin: Chén Xīnghàn; born October 8, 1981), known professionally as Jenova Chen, is a Chinese video game designer. He is the designer of the award-winning games Cloud, Flow, Flower, and Journey, co-founder of Thatgamecompany as well as an advisor for Annapurna Interactive.

Chen is from Shanghai, where he earned a bachelor's degree in computer science with a minor in digital art and design from Shanghai Jiao Tong University. He moved to the United States, where he earned a master's degree from the University of Southern California's Interactive Media Division. While there he created Cloud and Flow, and met fellow student Kellee Santiago. After a brief period at Maxis working on Spore, he founded Thatgamecompany with Santiago and became the company's creative director. The company signed a three-game deal with Sony Computer Entertainment, and has sold Flow, Flower, and Journey through the PlayStation Network.

As Chen was born in a culture other than the culture he lives in, he tries to make games that appeal universally to all people. His goal with his games is to help video games mature as a medium by making games that inspire emotional responses in the player that other games are lacking. Although he and Thatgamecompany can and have made more traditional games, he does not plan on commercially developing any of them, as he does not think that it fits with their goals as an independent video game developer.

== Early life and education ==
Chen was born in Shanghai on October 8, 1981, and lived there until 2003. His parents were "a middle-class family". His father worked in the software development industry, having previously worked on "one of the earliest giant computers in China". Although Chen was interested in art and drawing as a young child, his father influenced him towards computers, entering him in programming contests from when he was 10 years old. He found himself interested in video games that he saw there, but was not as enthusiastic about programming. While a teenager, he had deep emotional experiences with games that he played, including The Legend of Sword and Fairy, which he ascribes to the fact that he was not as exposed to books, films, or life events that other people would have had those experiences with. These experiences drove him to try to create those types of feelings in games as an adult, when more emotional maturity had caused his "standards to rise" in what would move him in a game. It was during high school that he chose the English name Jenova after a character in Final Fantasy VII, wanting a name that would be unique anywhere he used it as there were "thousands of Jason Chens".

He earned a degree in computer science and engineering at Shanghai Jiao Tong University, which due to his background in computers he found "quite easy", but described himself as spending much of his time there teaching himself digital art and animation, and later did a minor in digital art and design at Donghua University. Still interested in video games, he was involved in making three video games as part of a student group while in school. Upon graduating, he had trouble finding a job in the Chinese video game industry that combined his interests of "engineering, art, and design", and additionally felt that "very few games [had] actually achieved those qualities that would be interesting to an adult". He also considered working in digital animation for films.

Chen went to the United States to earn a master's degree in the School of Cinematic Arts at the University of Southern California. Chen studied in the Interactive Media Program, a new division of the School of Cinematic Arts. His intention at the time was to use the degree to get the kind of job he wanted back in China. At USC, he became inspired when he went to the Game Developers Conference, where he positively compared the games he had made in college with the student work present at the Independent Games Festival portion of the conference. While at USC he met Kellee Santiago, another student in the same program, and the two decided to work together on games that would be outside of the mainstream.

== Career ==
=== Early games ===
His first major game, which won a grant of twenty thousand dollars from USC to produce, was Cloud, released in 2005, which "focuses on a young hospital patient who soars in his mind despite being trapped indoors". The idea was partially based on himself, as when he was a child he was often hospitalized for asthma. It was designed as an attempt to "expand the spectrum of emotions video games evoke". At a student showcase at the Game Developers Conference, Chen and Santiago showed the game to a representative from Sony, John Hight, saying that it was the first game in the "Zen" genre. Hight was interested, though no deal was forthcoming. The game won the Best Student Philosophy award at the Slamdance Guerrilla Games Competition and a Student Showcase award at the Independent Games Festival, and was showcased on Spike TV, G4TV, and CBS Sunday.

Chen felt that the reason that Cloud had been so warmly received was because the emotions it sparked in players were different than any other game available at the time, and believed that it was his "calling" to make more games that changed what people saw video games as. Chen went on to do his master's thesis the following year in the concept of dynamic difficulty adjustment, where the game adjusts how it reacts to the player based on the past and present actions of that player. Chen illustrated his ideas with Flow, a Flash game made with Nicholas Clark. The game involves the player guiding an aquatic microorganism through various depths of the ocean, consuming other organisms and evolving in the process. It was released in March 2006; it received 100,000 downloads in its first two weeks and by July had been downloaded over 650,000 times. A PlayStation 3 version was announced in May 2006 as a downloadable game via the PlayStation Store, and was released in February 2007. A version for the PlayStation Portable, developed by SuperVillain Studios, was released in March 2008. Flow became the most downloaded game on the PlayStation Network in 2007, and won Best Downloadable Game at the Game Developers Choice Awards.

=== Thatgamecompany ===
After graduating, Chen and Santiago formed their own company, Thatgamecompany, in Los Angeles. They signed a deal with Sony for three PlayStation Store games. The PS3 version of Flow was the first, and while it was in development Chen worked for Maxis on the game Spore. Upon Flow's release, Chen returned to Thatgamecompany and began working on their second game.

The next game, Flower, was Chen and Thatgamecompany's "first game outside the safety net of academia". Chen was the creative director in charge of the game, while Santiago was the producer and Clark was the lead designer. The company ranged in size from six to nine people at varying stages of the game's development. Flower was intended by Chen to provoke positive emotions in the player, and to act as "an emotional shelter". Chen described the game as "an interactive poem exploring the tension between urban and nature". He decided on a "nature" theme early in the development process, saying that he "had this concept that every PlayStation is like a portal in your living room, it leads you to somewhere else. I thought; wouldn't it be nice if it was a portal that would allow you to be embraced by nature." Chen designed the game around the idea that the primary purpose of entertainment products like video games was the feelings that they evoked in the audience, and that the emotional range of most games was very limited. To make Flower have the "emotional spectrum" that he wanted, Chen looked at the development process as creating a work of art, rather than a "fun" game, which would not provoke the desired emotions. In 2008, during Flower's development, Chen was named to the Massachusetts Institute of Technology MIT Technology Review Innovators Under 35 list, as one of the top 35 innovators in the world under the age of 35.

Flower was released to critical praise and awards. Chen and Thatgamecompany moved on to their next game, Journey. Journey was intended by Chen to focus on the element of communication and social interaction in video games. Since in most games the communication between players is focused on specific goals, in Journey Chen intended for the player to be able to either play alone or to come across other players, but not be able to communicate with them directly. Instead, players have to build relationships with each other through their actions, helping each other or leaving as they choose. Journey was released on the PlayStation Network on March 13, 2012, to critical acclaim.

Chen also worked as creative director on Thatgamecompany's first mobile game, Sky: Children of the Light, released in 2019 to positive critical reception.

== Design philosophy ==
Chen plays a wide variety of video games, but he names his greatest influences as Katamari Damacy, Ico and Shadow of the Colossus. He also names Final Fantasy VII as an influence, and the game that he took his adopted name from. He personally plays games "competitively", including titles such as Street Fighter IV and StarCraft. He feels he has a competitive nature, which he has turned towards "winning" at being a game designer by creating games that are unlike what is in the market rather than towards creating competitive games. As he was raised in China and works in America, Chen feels that he cannot fully relate to either culture as a game designer. As such, instead of trying to make games that fit perfectly with one culture he tries to make games that tap into feelings that are universal and independent of culture.

When Chen quit Maxis to re-join Thatgamecompany, he did so knowing that it would mean taking less pay and having a less stable career. He felt, though, that it was important to the industry and medium as a whole to create games that provoked different emotional responses in the player than just excitement or fear. While Chen is not opposed to making action games, and his company has made internal "exciting" games that were well received at Sony, he feels that there is no point to Thatgamecompany commercially producing games like that instead of working for existing game developers, as they would not be making anything new that justified the cost of remaining an independent studio. Similarly, Chen does not intend for Thatgamecompany to make "big budget blockbuster games", as the pressure on profits that entails would stifle the innovation that he wants Thatgamecompany to focus on. Chen believes that for video games to become a mature medium like film, the industry as a whole needs to create a wide range of emotional responses to their games, similar to how film has thriller, romance, and comedy genres based on the emotions they provoke. He feels that there are only three ways for video games to impact adults in the same way they do children: "intellectually, whereby the work reveals a new perspective about the world that you have not seen before," by "emotionally touching someone," and "by creating a social environment where the intellectual or emotional stimulation could happen from other people."

== Ludography ==
Games designed by Chen
Year	Title	Role	Developer
2005	Cloud	Co-designer	USC student project
2006	Flow	Designer	USC; ported by Thatgamecompany (PS3, 2007) and SuperVillain Studios (PSP, 2008)
2009	Flower	Creative director	Thatgamecompany
2012	Journey	Creative director	Thatgamecompany
2019	Sky: Children of the Light	Creative director	Thatgamecompany

== Awards and honors ==
- 2005: Best Student Philosophy, Slamdance Guerrilla Games Competition, for Cloud
- 2005: Student Showcase, Independent Games Festival, for Cloud
- 2008: Best Downloadable Game, Game Developers Choice Awards, for Flow
- 2008: Innovators Under 35, MIT Technology Review
- 2010: Nominations, British Academy Games Awards, for Flower
