= Kellee Santiago =

Venezuelan American video game designer and producer

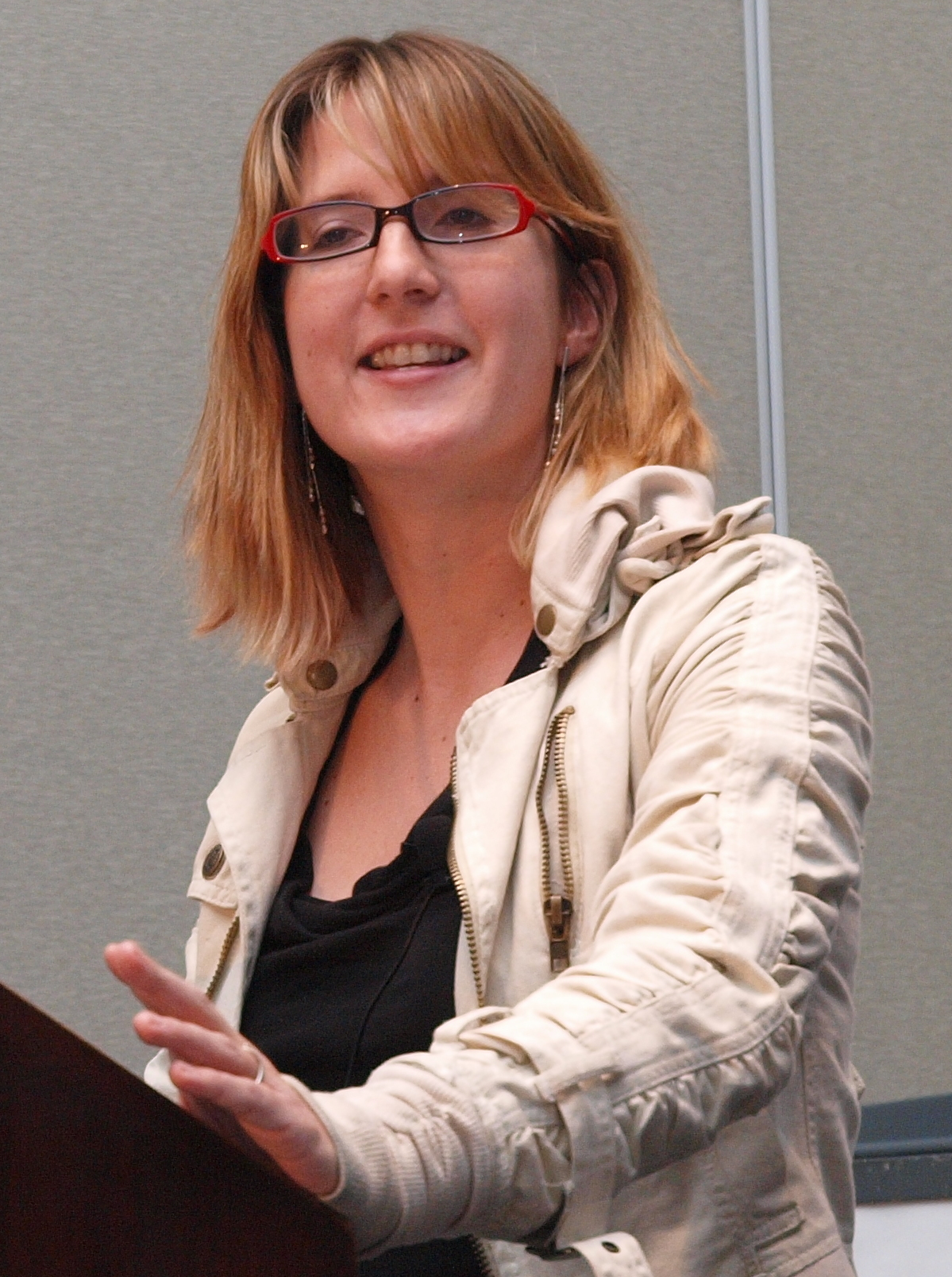
- Santiago at the Game Developers Conference in 2010
- Born: 1978 or 1979 (age 46-48); Caracas, Venezuela
- Occupations: Game designer, producer
- Known for: Thatgamecompany
- Notable work: Cloud, Flow, Flower, Journey
- Spouse: Mike Stein
- Website: kelleesantiago.com

Kellee Santiago (born 1978 or 1979) is a Venezuelan American video game designer and producer. She is the co-founder and former president of thatgamecompany. Born in Caracas, Venezuela, Santiago was raised in Richmond, Virginia, where she played video games from a young age and was encouraged by her software engineer father to experiment with computers. While attending New York University's Tisch School of the Arts, she became active in experimental theater, planning to pursue it after earning a master's degree in the Interactive Media Program of the School of Cinematic Arts at the University of Southern California. However, Santiago became involved in video game design and produced Cloud, a game developed by Jenova Chen and a student team. Its success sparked her and Chen to found thatgamecompany upon graduating, and she became its president.

Santiago produced the studio's first two games, Flow and Flower, moving more into her president role during the development of the third game, Journey. In addition to her work at thatgamecompany, Santiago is one of the backers of the Indie Fund. Indie Fund is a group that invests in the development of independent video games and is a TED fellow. She married the fellow University of Southern California graduate Mike Stein in 2010. After the release of Journey in 2012, Santiago left the company; since then, Santiago has served on several advisory boards and worked for Ouya, Google Play Games, Niantic, and E-Line Media, in several roles.

== Biography ==
Santiago was born in Caracas, Venezuela, and was raised in Richmond, Virginia. She played video games from a young age, cooperatively playing them with her younger brother; one of her earliest games was Sleuth, which she describes as "simple, but so effective and so evocative" in instilling emotion in the player. Her father, a software engineer, had a computer in the house from when she was young, and encouraged Santiago to experiment with it. She moved to New York City at the age of 18 to attend the Tisch School of the Arts of New York University, where she was involved in amateur theater. She focused in theater on developing new works, rather than adapting older ones, and was especially drawn towards incorporating interactive digital media into her works. She ascribes this to her father's work in software engineering and her experiments with computers, which drove her into using them in her performances as she had more experience than the others in her group.

She moved to Los Angeles in 2003 when she was 24, and studied towards a master's degree in the Interactive Media Program of the School of Cinematic Arts at the University of Southern California. Her intention was to remain in theater, but in her second semester took a class taught by Tracy Fullerton on the history of game design, which inspired her to focus her studies on video game design instead. The class caused her to realize "how much hadn't been done" in the realm of communication and expression in video games and the lack of established structure and rules as to how it was best to make games, which appealed to the part of her that was interested in experimental theater. While at school she produced the award-winning game Cloud, a videogame that depicts a story that explores the ideas of an out-of-body experience and was developed by Jenova Chen and a student team, and also worked on other video games such as Darfur is Dying.

Cloud was intended as an experiment by the group to see if they could create a game that "expressed something different than video games had in the past", as well as determine the level of interest in the gaming community for video games of that nature. The game received over 400,000 downloads in the first four months after release, "more than every single person in every single theater [she] had ever worked in," which convinced Santiago to remain in the video game industry indefinitely. The strong response to the game, released in 2005, inspired her and Chen to consider founding their own company to continue making games like it after they left school—where the design was based on the emotions they wanted to inspire rather than gameplay mechanics.

=== thatgamecompany ===
Upon graduating, Santiago and Chen founded thatgamecompany in May 2006, with a contract with Sony Computer Entertainment to develop three games for the PlayStation Network. In addition to her role as president of the company, she also initially served as the producer for the studio. Despite her job title, she was still involved in the design of the games as well. The first game by the studio was Flow, an adaptation of a game that Chen had made for his thesis at USC, which was released in 2007. The game caused the studio to be noted as a key figure of independent video game development; in 2008, Gamasutra recognized the studio as one of the "20 Breakthrough Developers" of the year, emphasizing Santiago's key role. The second game for the studio, and the first to be completely original to the company, was Flower, released in 2009. Both titles were heavily praised by critics and received several awards, as well as garnering high sales. For the studio's third game, Journey, thatgamecompany hired Robin Hunicke as the producer, allowing Santiago to focus more on directing the company as a whole. Journey was released on March 13, 2012; two weeks later on March 29, 2012, Santiago announced her departure from thatgamecompany, not specifying what her plans were for the future.

During the development of Journey, in 2009, Santiago became a TED fellow, giving a talk at a USC conference where she discussed whether video games were art, which was responded to a year later by Roger Ebert. Santiago was one of the backers of the Indie Fund, started in March 2010, a group which invests in the development of independent video games. In October 2010, Santiago married Mike Stein, whom she met while they were both at the University of Southern California. In 2011 she was named as one of the top 100 most influential women in technology by the Magazine Fast Company focusing on design, technology and business.

=== Developer relations ===
In March 2013, Santiago joined Ouya, a microconsole which allows the owner to be a developer in order to lead developer relations. She also joined the Women in Games International advisory board in May 2014. In this time period, she also became an official advisor for Night Light Interactive. In October 2015, following the sale and dissolution of the company, Santiago left Ouya for Google Play Games. In 2019, she left Google to become the head of developer relations at Niantic; she left Niantic for E-Line Media, where she was an executive vice president from 2024–2025.

== Influences and philosophy ==
External videos
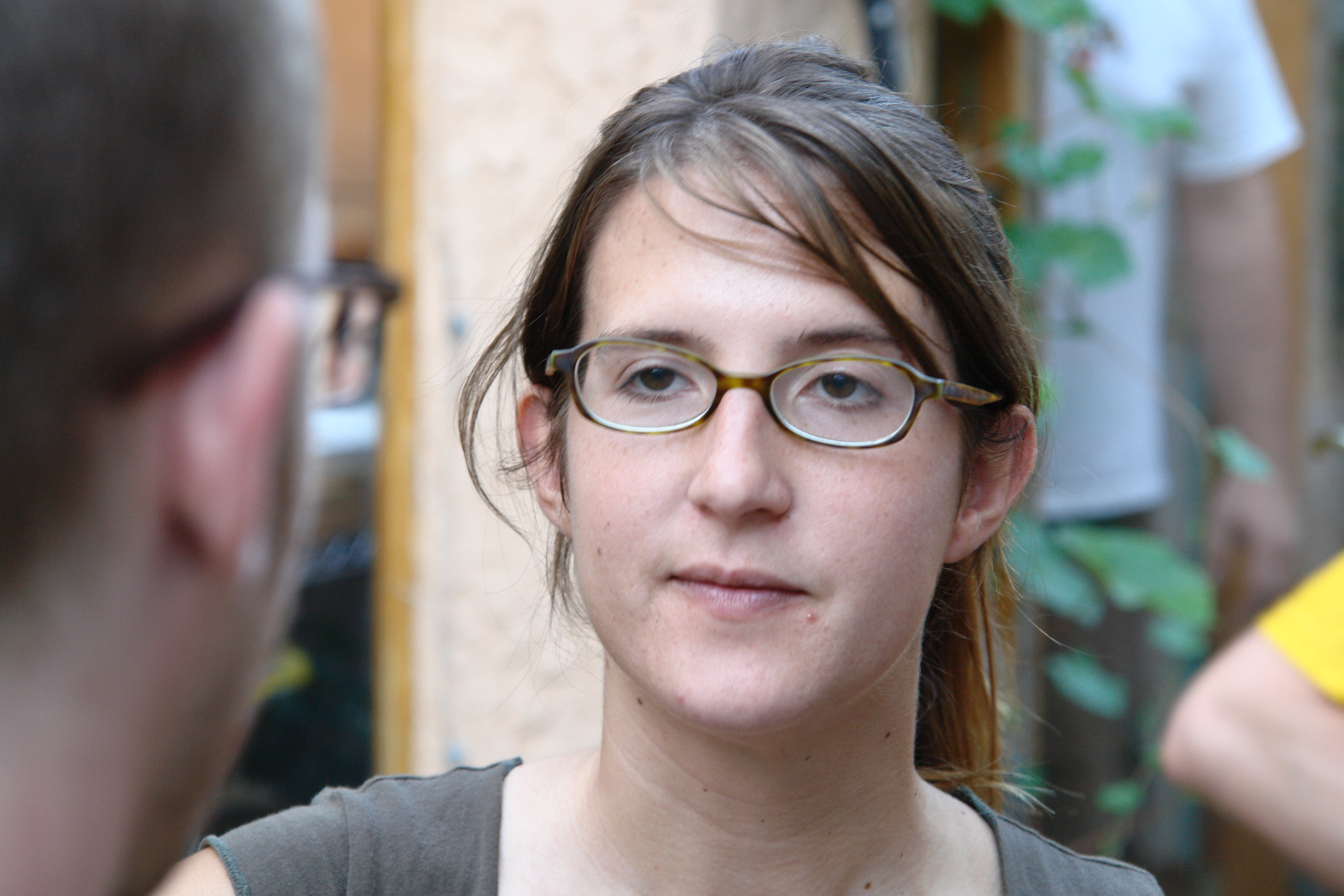
- The Art of Video Games: Interview with Kellee Santiago, Jenova Chen, and Robin Hunicke, Smithsonian American Art Museum

Santiago described her work at thatgamecompany as creating emotional responses, in order to demonstrate that video games can create a wider range of experiences than are typically shown. She felt that thatgamecompany's goal during her tenure there was "to create games that push the boundaries of videogames as a communicative medium, and to create games that appeal to a wide variety of people." Through this she hopes to change the rest of the industry to also approach making videogames as a "creative medium" rather than a product. She, both independently with the Indie Fund and through thatgamecompany has tried to support the independent video game development industry by funding and connecting independent game developers.
