= Cloud game =

Cloud game may refer to:

- Cloud (video game)
- Cloud gaming
