= USC Interactive Media & Games Division =

Division within the USC School of Cinematic Arts

Coordinates: 34.02400°N 118.27919°W

The University of Southern California's School of Cinematic Arts's Interactive Media & Games Division first accepted M.F.A. students in 2002. The division currently offers both undergraduate (B.F.A.) and graduate (M.F.A. and M.S.) programs in interactive media and game design, as well as B.F.A. programs in game art and themed entertainment and an M.A. in media arts, games and health. The programs include courses in game design, game development, production, audio, animation, and user research as well as experimental work in gestural and immersive interfaces, transmedia design, and interactive cinema.

From 2010-2015 and 2017-2025, USC was named as the number-one design program for games in North America by the Princeton Review.

Major funders of the USC IMGD include Microsoft and Electronic Arts, both of which companies have endowed faculty positions in the program. Game industry executive Bing Gordon was the first holder of the Electronic Arts Endowed Chair in Interactive Entertainment, which is currently held by game designer Tracy Fullerton. The Microsoft Endowed Professorship is held by user research pioneer Dennis Wixon.

In 2012, the school announced plans for a new building to house the Interactive Media program and associated research labs, including the Game Innovation Lab. In early 2013, Tracy Fullerton, the Electronic Arts Endowed Chair of Interactive Media, announced that the division, formerly known as the Interactive Media Division, was renamed the Interactive Media & Games Division to "honor the groundbreaking work in games that our faculty and students have produced in the decade since our division was formed."

In 2013, alumni Jenova Chen and Kellee Santiago, founders of thatgamecompany were honored with multiple awards for Game of the Year, Game Direction, Innovation, and Game Design for their game Journey (2012).

In 2014, students and Kellee Santiago from IMGD were recruited to participate in a reality TV game show project that ended with the "indie community ultimately deciding it didn't need to put up with this s***." according to Eurogamer.

== Projects ==
- Cloud – an experimental computer game from 2005, funded in part by a grant from Electronic Arts.
- flOw
- Darfur is Dying
- PMOG – A vast social meta-game that can be played by completing missions on the Web.
- Reality Ends Here – A pervasive game experience for incoming School of Cinematic Arts freshmen.
- Outer Wilds
- Chambara – award-winning stealth-action multiplayer game
- Walden, a game – award-winning game about Henry David Thoreau

== Personnel ==
=== Faculty & Staff ===
Currently, the division is chaired by Danny Bilson, a game producer, writer and former executive. Full-time faculty and staff include Tracy Fullerton, Richard Lemarchand, Mark Bolas, Peter Brinson, Marientina Gotsis, Andreas Kratky, Sam Roberts, Sean Bouchard, Jesse Vigil, Martzi Campos, Todd Furmanski, Lucas Peterson and Timothy Lee. Adjunct faculty include Laird Malamed, Gordon Bellamy, Carl Schnurr, Heather Desurvire, Vincent Diamante, Chevon Hicks, Robert Nashak, and Scott Rogers.

Former faculty and staff include Scott Fisher – founding chair of the division, Jen Stein, Steve Anderson, Anne Balsamo, Chris Swain, Peggy Weil, Jeremy Gibson, Julian Bleecker, Michael Lew, Erik Loyer, Michael Naimark, Eddo Stern, Perry Hoberman, William Huber, Mark Essen, Akira Thompson, Michael Kontopolous, Joseph Olin, Kurosh ValaNejad, Jeff Watson, Jane Pinckard, and Dennis Wixon.

=== Alumni ===
Notable alumni have include the founders of thatgamecompany, including Jenova Chen and Kellee Santiago. Also, Justin Hall, Matt Korba and Paul Bellezza of The Odd Gentlemen, Asher Vollmer (Threes!), Sean Plott (Day9), Adam Sulzdorf-Liszkiewicz (RUST LTD), and Elle Schneider (developer of the Digital Bolex) attended the program.

There are also notable dropouts of the program for example the creator of Giant Sparrow.
