= Ian McDowall =

American technology executive

Ian E. McDowall

Ian McDowall is the CEO of Fakespace Labs, a research and products company in Mountain View, California. He is one of the founders of Fakespace, started in 1991, and developed hardware and software for high end scientific and government virtual reality applications. Working with Mark Bolas and Eric Lorimer, the company created tools including the Boom, Push, Fs2, Pinch Gloves, Immersive Workbenches, the Rave, and a software library called VLIB. In 1998, Fakespace spun into two companies, Fakespace Systems and Fakespace Labs.

In 2006, he helped develop a very wide field of view, stereoscopic, head-mounted display called the Wide5 to be used in the virtual reality field. The Wide5 weighs less than 1 kg and displays a stereo image over a field of view ~150° horizontally, ~88° vertical with a physical display resolution of 640x480 resampled from an input signal resolution of 1600x1200 at 60 Hz; the display cost around US$32,500 Other projects include development of fast frame rate projectors; light field displays; fast camera capture systems; and optical projects in the display and camera/image acquisition space.
