= Flower (video game) =

2009 video game

- Banner on Thatgamecompany's website
- Developer: Thatgamecompany (Note: Supervision and support by Santa Monica Studio. Ported to PlayStation 4 and PlayStation Vita by Bluepoint Games, and to iOS and Windows by Inline Assembly Ltd.)
- Publishers: Sony Computer Entertainment; Annapurna Interactive (iOS, PC)
- Director: Jenova Chen
- Designer: Nicholas Clark
- Composer: Vincent Diamante
- Engine: PhyreEngine
- Platforms: PlayStation 3; PlayStation Vita; PlayStation 4; iOS; Microsoft Windows
- Release: February 12, 2009: PlayStation 3; WW: February 12, 2009; PlayStation Vita; NA: November 12, 2013; EU: November 29, 2013; PlayStation 4; NA: November 15, 2013; EU: November 29, 2013; iOS; WW: September 28, 2017; Microsoft Windows; WW: February 14, 2019
- Genres: Adventure, art game
- Mode: Single-player

Flower is a video game developed by Thatgamecompany and published by Sony Computer Entertainment for the PlayStation 3. It was designed by Jenova Chen and Nicholas Clark and was released in February 2009 on the PlayStation Network. PlayStation 4 and PlayStation Vita versions of the game were ported by Bluepoint Games and released in November 2013. An iOS version was released in September 2017, and a Windows version was released in February 2019, both published by Annapurna Interactive. The game was intended as a "spiritual successor" to Flow, a previous title by Chen and Thatgamecompany. In Flower, the player controls the wind, blowing a flower petal through the air using the movement of the game controller. Flying close to flowers results in the player's petal being followed by other flower petals. Approaching flowers may also have side-effects on the game world, such as bringing vibrant color to previously dead fields or activating stationary wind turbines. The game features no text or dialogue, forming a narrative arc primarily through visual representation and emotional cues.

Flower was primarily intended to arouse positive emotions in the player, rather than to be a challenging and "fun" game. This focus was sparked by Chen, who felt that the primary purpose of entertainment products like video games was the feelings that they evoked in the audience and that the emotional range of most games was very limited. The team viewed their efforts as creating a work of art, removing gameplay elements and mechanics that were not provoking the desired response in the players. The music, composed by Vincent Diamante, dynamically responds to the player's actions and corresponds with the emotional cues in the game. Flower was a critical success, to the surprise of the developers. Reviewers praised the game's music, visuals, and gameplay, calling it a unique and compelling emotional experience. It was named the "best independent game of 2009" at the Spike Video Game Awards, and won the "Casual Game of the Year" award by the Academy of Interactive Arts and Sciences.

== Gameplay ==
A screenshot of Flower, showing a trail of flower petals as viewed by the player as they are blown through the air

Flower is divided up into six main levels and one credits level. Each level is represented by a flower in a pot on a city apartment windowsill, and upon selecting one the player is taken to the "dream" of that flower. Once inside a level, the player controls the wind as it blows a single flower petal through the air. Changes in the pitch and roll of the floating petal are accomplished by tilting the PlayStation 3 controller. Pressing any button blows the wind harder, which in turn moves the petal faster. The camera generally follows just behind the petal, though it sometimes moves to show a new objective or consequence of the player's actions.

Groups and lines of flowers are present in each level; approaching these with the petal causes them to bloom and a new petal to trail the first. When the player approaches certain flowers or groups of flowers, changes are made to the game world. These include opening new areas, transforming dead grassy areas to bright green fields, or activating wind turbines. These changes generally result in new flowers sprouting for the player to interact with. Flying through each flower results in a musical chime that harmonizes with the music. The music itself dynamically adjusts as changes are made to the world. The more flower petals the player has trailing the lead petal, the faster the petals move. It is impossible for the player to lose a level or any progress. The game features no enemies, hit points, or time limits. A single play-through of the game takes approximately one hour.

Although no speech or text is used anywhere in the game aside from credits and interaction hints in the main menu, the six flower dreams follow a narrative arc. The player's starting location in each stage appears to be near the ending location of the previous one, and through the course of the game the player approaches a distant city. The first levels focus on restoring life and color to the landscape. After activating a series of windmills, the player flies through a nighttime field, illuminating darkened strings of lights until they reach the city. The city is full of menacing metal structures similar to lattice towers, small arcs of electricity, and washed-out buildings; the player enlivens the city in the final two levels and transforms it into a bright and cheerful place.

As the player progresses through the different levels of the game, the city viewed through the apartment window in the level selection screen gradually becomes more vibrant and colorful. If the player triggers three secret flowers in each level, the cityscape is replaced with a bright field with mountains in the background. The music changes in scope as the game progresses, growing in scale and complexity and adding to the narrative arc. The credits level is played in a similar manner to the main levels, but as the player flies through each flower the name of a person involved in the game appears above it. Flower includes PlayStation Network trophies in keeping with the game's feel. While some are objective-based, many are centered on relaxing and watching the scenery.

== Development ==
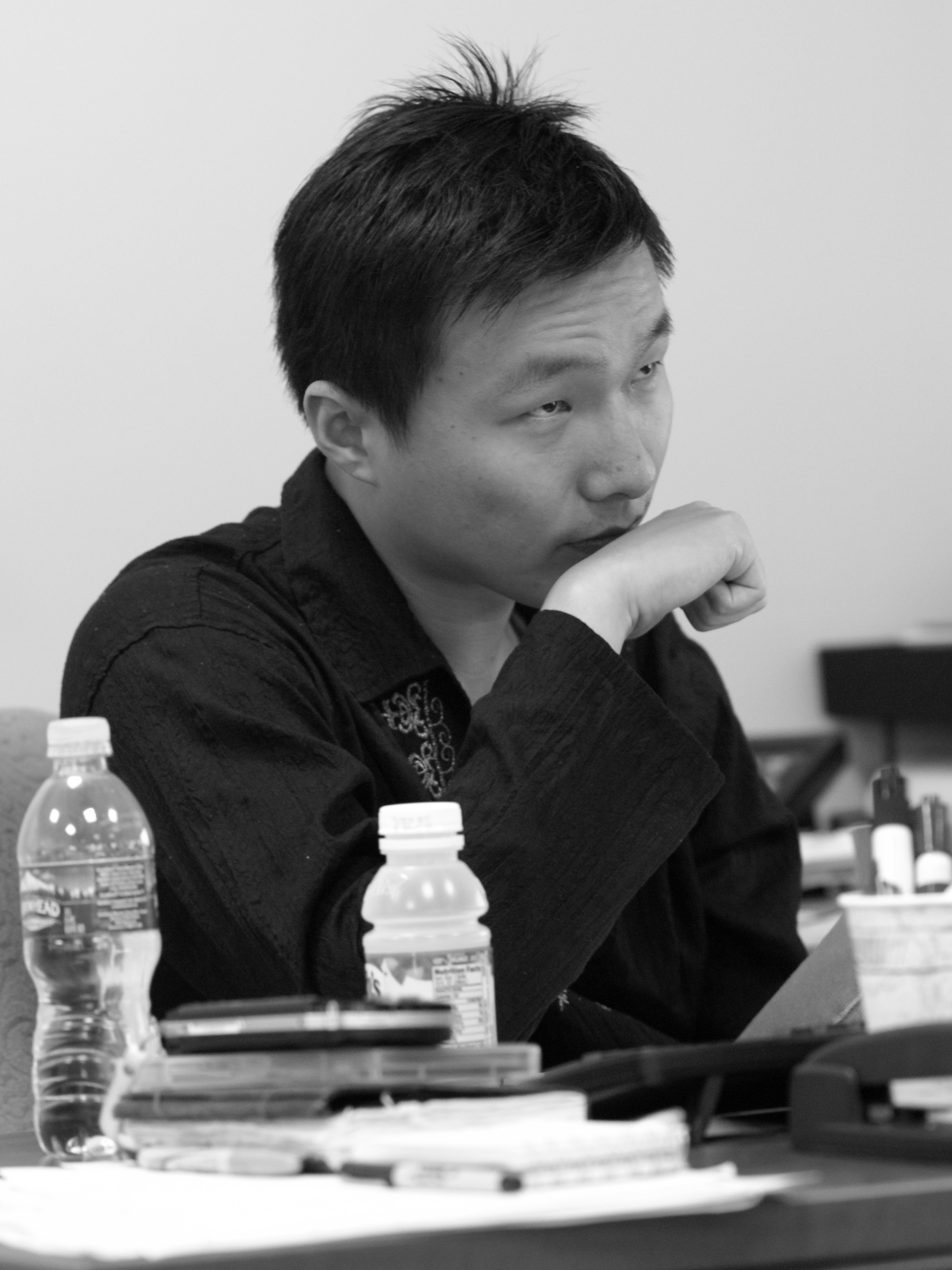
Designer Jenova Chen in 2007

Flower was developed as a spiritual successor to Flow, a 2006 Flash game created by Jenova Chen and Nicholas Clark while the two were students at the University of Southern California. Flow was later developed into a PlayStation 3 game by Thatgamecompany in 2007 and a PlayStation Portable game by SuperVillain Studios in 2008. Flower was Thatgamecompany's "first game outside the safety net of academia". It was first announced at the Tokyo Game Show on September 24, 2007, and was released on the PlayStation Network on February 12, 2009. Flower was intended primarily to provoke positive emotions in the player, and to act as "an emotional shelter".

Six to nine people were involved at varying stages of development. Chen, who co-founded Thatgamecompany with game producer Kellee Santiago, was the creative director in charge of the game, while Clark was the lead designer. Chen described the game as "an interactive poem exploring the tension between urban and nature". He decided on the "nature" theme early in the development process, saying that he "had this concept that every PlayStation is like a portal in your living room, it leads you to somewhere else. I thought; wouldn't it be nice if it was a portal that would allow you to be embraced by nature". Initially the game would use cutscenes to tell the story of the apartment dweller more explicitly, but that was cut as the team did not have animators who could make the scenes, and the team tried to tell the same story abstractly with just the flowers.

Before beginning work, the development team commissioned two pieces of music that they felt would inspire the right emotional tone for the game to guide their efforts. They created a number of prototypes, including concepts focused on growing flowers and based around human consciousness. The team decided that a prototype centered on petals floating in the wind best captured the emotions they wanted to evoke. They made keeping the player in a peaceful emotional state their design focus, and removed elements that frustrated players such as petal collection requirements to unlock levels and game mechanics that were too traditional and made the players too excited. The team tried to not place any barriers in the levels, allowing the player to go anywhere in an open world but realized that without a few guidelines, such as the camera focusing on new flowers or segmenting the levels, players became confused and frustrated. Chen described the process as "almost like we wanted to throw away the traditional game design, but we end up picking up all the pieces we threw away and putting them back because we know those are actually needed to deliver a good guided experience". The overall development time was two years, but the team spent three quarters of that time in the prototyping stage. After deciding on the game elements, Flower was produced in only six months.

The game's focus on emotions was sparked by Chen, who felt that the primary purpose of entertainment products like video games was the feelings that they evoked in the audience and that the emotional range of most games was very limited. Chen tried to make the game focus more on emotions than on a message; he specifically changed the design of Flower when early testers felt there was a message of promoting green energy in the game. To make Flower have the "emotional spectrum" that he wanted, Chen looked at the development process as creating a work of art, rather than a "fun" game, which would not provoke the desired emotions. He summarized this view by saying that the only gameplay mechanic is hitting a flower to trigger a new event. The team specifically cut out deeper gameplay elements because these would have added "challenge" to the game, which, while fun, would not have been relaxing. Santa Monica Studio contracted with Bluepoint Games to create ports of the game for the PlayStation 4 and PlayStation Vita, which were published in November 2013 to correspond with the release of the PlayStation 4. Annapurna Interactive brought Flower to the iOS platform in September 2017, and to Microsoft Windows in February 2019.

=== Music ===
Flower: Original Soundtrack

Soundtrack album by Vincent Diamante
- Released: 2010
- Genre: Soundtrack
- Length: 64:37

The music for Flower was created by Vincent Diamante, a video game music composer and professor at the University of Southern California's Interactive Media Division. He had previously scored the music for Chen's first game Cloud (2005), and Dyadin (2005), when he and Chen were both at the University of Southern California. He worked directly with the development team to integrate the music into the game by adjusting the placements of flowers and the tones that each type played when they were reached. He did this by harmonizing the gameplay with the music, and adjusting the music dynamically to correspond to changes in the game world. Diamante used his music to influence the development team in adapting ideas he had for the game.

The music and instruments in each level were chosen to correspond to the game world and the level's placement in the overall emotional arc. The music is composed of multiple layers of acoustic instrument tracks that rise and fall in correlation with the player's actions. The instruments used include pianos, string instruments such as classical guitars, and woodwinds such as bass flutes and bassoons. The number of instruments playing increases in correlation with the amount of petals that the player gathers. The music is meant to suggest natural sounds like wind. The instrument tracks were intended to be able to stand on their own, even when used in a large orchestrated group as in levels three and six. Several times in the development process, Diamante became so attached to a piece of music that needed alteration that he composed a new piece to replace it. Diamante was long in talks with Sony to produce an album of music from the game. On April 8, 2010, a soundtrack album was released by Sony for purchase on the PlayStation Network. The album, titled Flower: Original Soundtrack from the Video Game, contains 8 tracks with a total duration of 1:04:37.

== Reception ==
Reception

Aggregate score
Aggregator	Score
Metacritic	PS3: 87/100; PS4: 91/100

Review scores
Publication	Score
1Up.com	A
Eurogamer	8/10
GameSpot	8/10
IGN	9/10
PALGN	9/10

Flower was well received by critics. Alice Liang of 1UP.com applauded the game, saying that "the freedom of movement makes the game feel as relaxing as a gently wafting breeze". She felt that "fun" did not fully describe the game experience, saying that it had a "well-constructed movie's emotional arc" and that the game's music, visuals, and gameplay all drew the player into a compelling emotional experience. She also felt that it was very replayable, which offset its brevity. Ryan Clements of IGN agreed with Liang's opinion, saying that it provided "more enjoyment, emotion and enlightenment than any game" he had played in years. Though he noted that the game would not appeal to everyone, he described it as "something very unique and very powerful", referring to it as a "must-play". Michael Kontoudis of PALGN called it an "utterly unique, brave and moving game brimming with personality and intent", though he noted that as it was closer to a work of art than a game, many players would not be interested in it. Gerard Campbell of The Press similarly described it as something more than a game, calling it a "perfect foil" to "ultra-violent shoot-'em-up" games and summarizing it as "one of the most refreshing and relaxing games around".

Eurogamer's Tom Bramwell had similar praise, describing it as "pleasantly innocent and uplifting", though he awarded it a lower score than other reviewers as he felt the US$9.99 price was too high for the game's length. This criticism was not universal, as reviewers such as Jason Hill of The Age called the Australian price of A$13 "reasonable" and described the length as not "overstay[ing] its welcome". Critics such as GamePro's Terry Terrones and GameTrailers echoed the same praises as other reviewers for the game; GameTrailers said that it was "less a game and more an experience. You don't necessarily 'play' Flower; you interact with it", while Terrones noted the music as the best part of the game's presentation. Tom Hoggins of The Daily Telegraph felt that Flower would "reignite the 'video games as art' debate" and was of the opinion that it was a "wonderful work of art" in addition to a game. Kevin Vanord of GameSpot, in reviewing the 2013 PlayStation 4 version, said that the game "invites introspection and inner calm", and that it was a type of game experience that was still rare four years after it first came out. The positive reception surprised the developers, as they had expected a mixed reaction.

Flower received the "Best Independent Game Fueled by Dew" award at the 2009 Spike Video Game Awards. It was similarly named the "Best Indie Game" of 2009 by Playboy. Flower was awarded "Casual Game of the Year" at the 13th Annual Interactive Achievement Awards; it also received nominations for "Outstanding Innovation in Gaming", and outstanding achievement in "Sound Design", "Original Music Composition", and "Game Direction". It was nominated for the "Use of Audio" video game awards by the British Academy of Film and Television Arts and won the "Artistic Achievement" award. Its soundtrack was awarded the 2009 "Best Original Soundtrack" prize from G4. The music was also nominated for the Game Audio Network Guild's "Music of the Year" award and won the "Best Interactive Score" award. Its gameplay debut at the 2008 Electronic Entertainment Expo resulted in multiple awards, including "Best E3 Download Game" from 1UP.com, "Best Original Game" from UGO, and "Special Achievement for Innovation" from IGN. In 2012, Flower was listed on Time's All-Time 100 greatest video games list.

In 2011, Flower was chosen through a public vote out of an initial selection of 240 to be one of 80 games showcased in a 2012 exhibit at the Smithsonian American Art Museum titled "The Art of Video Games". In 2013, the museum acquired the game for its permanent collection. The game was showcased in the 2015 Smithsonian exhibition, Watch This! Revelations in Media Art.
