= Mark Bolas =

American academic

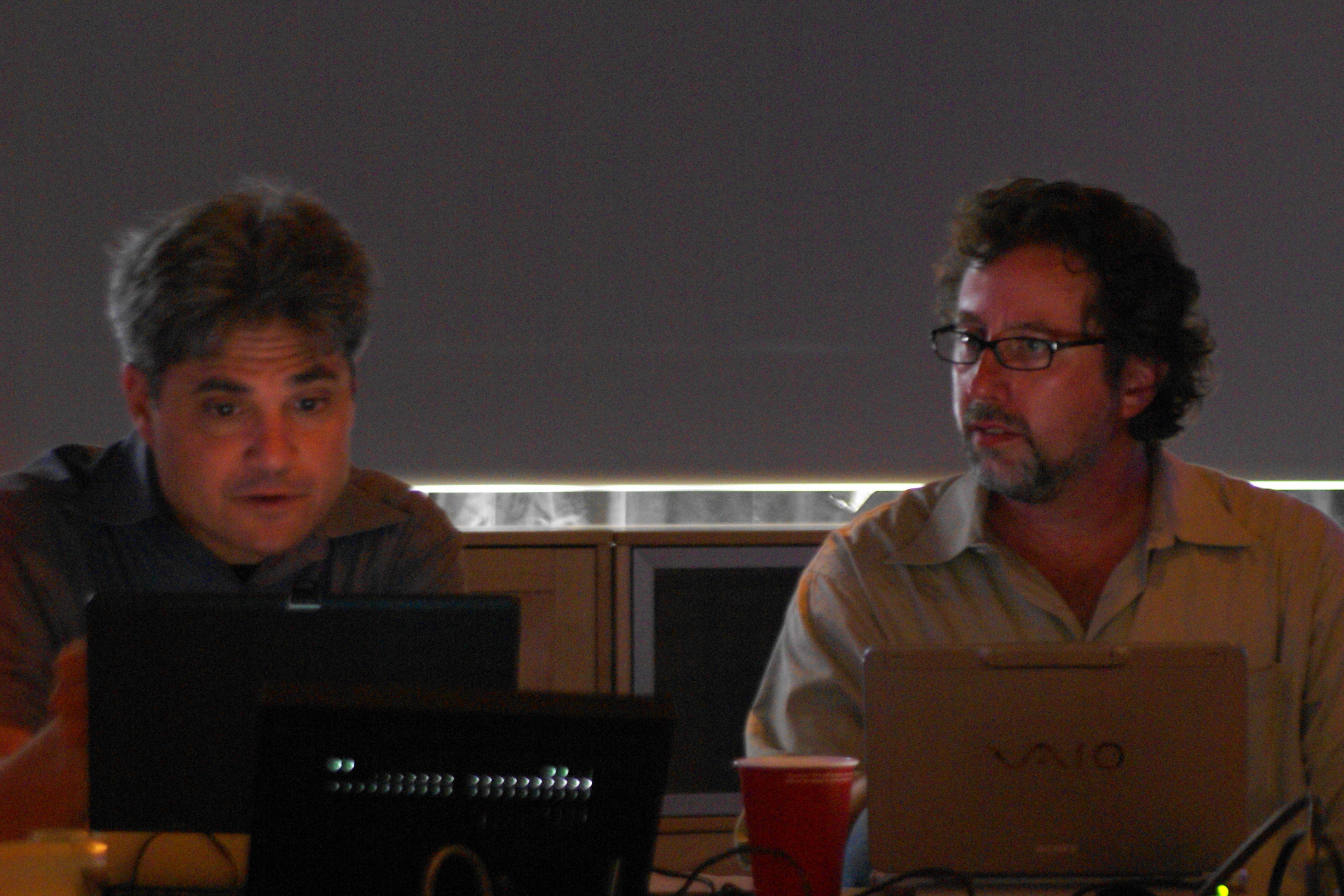
- Mark Bolas and Jordan Weisman at USC IMD in August 2006
- Awards: IEEE VGTC Virtual Reality Technical Achievement Award (2005)
- Scientific career
- Fields: Virtual Reality, Human-Computer Interaction, Mixed Reality
- Institutions: University of Southern California (USC); Microsoft (HoloLens Team)

Mark T. Bolas is a research scientist and professor known for his work in virtual reality. He serves as

a Professor of Interactive Media in the USC Interactive Media Division, USC School of Cinematic Arts at the University of Southern California, Director of their Interactive Narrative and Immersive Technologies Lab, Director of Mixed Reality Laboratory at USC's Institute for Creative Technologies, and chairman of Fakespace Labs in Mountain View, California. Bolas is currently on leave from USC, working on the Hololens team at Microsoft.

In 1988, Bolas co-founded Fakespace Inc. with Ian McDowall and Eric Lorimer to build instrumentation for research labs to explore virtual reality. This work resulted in the invention of display and interaction tools used by many VR research and development centers around the world, including the BOOM (Binocular Omni-Orientation Monitor), the Pinch glove, the RAVE, the PUSH, and VLIB software.

Bolas was awarded the IEEE VGTC Virtual Reality Technical Achievement Award for 2005 in recognition for seminal technical achievement in virtual and augmented reality.
