= Journey (2012 video game) =

Adventure game by Thatgamecompany

- Developer: Thatgamecompany (Note: Additional work and assistance by Santa Monica Studio. Ported to PlayStation 4 by Tricky Pixels, and to Windows and iOS by Inline Assembly Ltd.)
- Publishers: Sony Computer Entertainment (Note: PlayStation 3 and PlayStation 4); Annapurna Interactive (Note: Windows and iOS)
- Director: Jenova Chen
- Producer: Robin Hunicke
- Designers: Nicholas Clark; Bryan Singh; Chris Bell
- Programmers: John Edwards; Martin Middleton
- Artists: Matt Nava; Aaron Jessie
- Composer: Austin Wintory
- Engine: PhyreEngine
- Platforms: PlayStation 3; PlayStation 4; Windows; iOS
- Release: PlayStation 3; NA: March 13, 2012; EU: March 14, 2012; PlayStation 4; NA: July 21, 2015; EU: July 21, 2015; Windows; WW: June 6, 2019; iOS; WW: August 6, 2019
- Genres: Adventure, art game
- Modes: Single-player, multiplayer

Journey is an adventure game developed by Thatgamecompany and published by Sony Computer Entertainment for the PlayStation 3. The indie game was released on the PlayStation Network in March 2012 and ported to PlayStation 4 in July 2015. It was later released on Windows in June 2019 and iOS in August 2019 by Annapurna Interactive.

In Journey, the player controls a cloaked figure in a vast desert, traveling towards a distant mountain. Other players on the same journey can be discovered, and two players can meet and assist each other, but they cannot communicate via speech or text and cannot see each other's names until after the game's credits. The only form of communication between the two is a musical chime, which transforms dull pieces of cloth found throughout the levels into vibrant red, affecting the game world and allowing the player to progress through the levels. The developers sought to evoke in the player a sense of smallness and wonder and to forge an emotional connection between them and the anonymous players they meet along the way. The music, composed by Austin Wintory, dynamically responds to the player's actions, building a single theme to represent the game's emotional arc throughout the story.

Journey has received critical acclaim, with praise for the visual and auditory art as well as the sense of companionship created by playing with a stranger. Critics have called it a moving and emotional experience, and have since listed it as one of the greatest video games of all time. Journey won several "game of the year" awards and received several other awards and nominations, including a Best Score Soundtrack for Visual Media nomination for the 2013 Grammy Awards. A retail "Collector's Edition", including Journey, Thatgamecompany's two previous titles, and additional media, was released in August 2012.

== Gameplay ==
The cloaked figure running in the desert along with another player's figure. One of the figures' scarves is glowing as it charges due to proximity to the other player.

In Journey, the player takes the role of a cloaked figure in a desert. After an introductory sequence, the player is shown the cloaked figure sitting in the sand, with a large mountain in the distance. The path towards this mountain, the ultimate destination of the game, is subdivided into several sections traveled through linearly. The player can walk in the levels, as well as control the camera, which typically follows behind the figure, either with the analog stick or by tilting the motion-sensitive controller. The player can jump with one button, or emit a wordless shout or musical note with another; the length and volume of the shout depends on how the button is pressed, and the note stays in tune with the background music. These controls are presented pictorially at the beginning of the game; at no point outside of the credits and title screen are any words shown or spoken.

The cloaked figure wears a trailing magical scarf which allows the player to briefly fly; doing so uses up the scarf's magical charge, represented visually by glowing runes on the scarf. The scarf's runes are recharged by being near floating pieces of red cloth, or a variety of other means. Touching glowing symbols scattered throughout the levels lengthens the initially vestigial scarf, allowing the player to remain airborne longer. Larger strips of cloth are present in the levels and can be transformed from a stiff, dull gray to vibrant red by singing near them. Doing so may have effects on the world such as releasing bits of magic cloth, forming bridges, or levitating the player. This, in turn, allows the player to progress in the level by opening doors or allowing them to reach previously inaccessible areas. The cloaked figure does not have visible arms to manipulate the game world directly. Along the way, the player encounters flying creatures made of cloth, some of which help the player along. In later levels, the player also encounters hostile creatures made of stone, which upon spotting the player rip off parts of the figure's scarf.

In each level, the player may come across one other player temporarily connected to their game. When players approach each other they charge one another's scarves. They cannot communicate with each other beyond patterns of singing. Players can help each other by activating strips of cloth or showing paths, but cannot hinder each other and are not necessary for completing any level. When two players finish a section at the same time they remain together into the next one; otherwise, they are connected to new players when they move on. While all the figures generally look the same, individual players can be told apart by unique symbols which are shown floating in the air when they sing and are displayed on their robes at all times. Players may also gain decorative patterns on their robe with successive playthroughs which can be distinguishing. The entire game takes two to three hours to complete.

== Story ==
Journey is a wordless story told through gameplay and visual-only cutscenes. The player's nameless character begins near a small sand dune in a vast desert. Walking to the top of the dune, the character can see looming in the far distance a large mysterious mountain with a glowing crevice that splits its peak. As the character approaches the mountain, they find the remnants of a once-thriving civilization, eroded by sand over time. Scattered throughout the ruins at the end of each area are stone shrines where the traveler rests and has visions of meeting a large, white-cloaked figure in an ethereal environment. Art adorns the walls of many areas, describing the rise and fall of the civilization, which also mirrors the player's journey. As the player journeys into the remains of a once sprawling city at the base of the mountain, they must also contend with roaming, ancient, hostile automaton weapons that are left over from a war over the civilization's main power source—a chargeable cloth that is the same material as the traveler's scarf—which caused the destruction of the civilization.

A vision shows the traveler crumble before reaching their destination, but the traveler chooses to continue on. Eventually making it safely to the mountain itself, the traveler begins to make their way up it; struggling and unable to charge their scarf, they enter the colder climates and encounter deep snow and high winds. With the crevice still a fair distance away, the traveler falls and collapses in the snow. Six of the white-cloaked figures appear before the character and grant the traveler new energy, allowing the player to fly to the summit of the mountain and walk into the crevice as the screen fills with white. The player is then shown the game's credits, playing over the ending cinematic scene; a shooting star emanates from the crevice and traverses the path the traveler took through the ruins, as glimpses of other cloaked travelers heading towards the mountain can be seen. Eventually, the star comes to rest at the sand dune where the game began, and the player is given the option of starting the game again. As the credits end, the player is shown the usernames of the other travelers who were with the player during the journey.

== Development ==
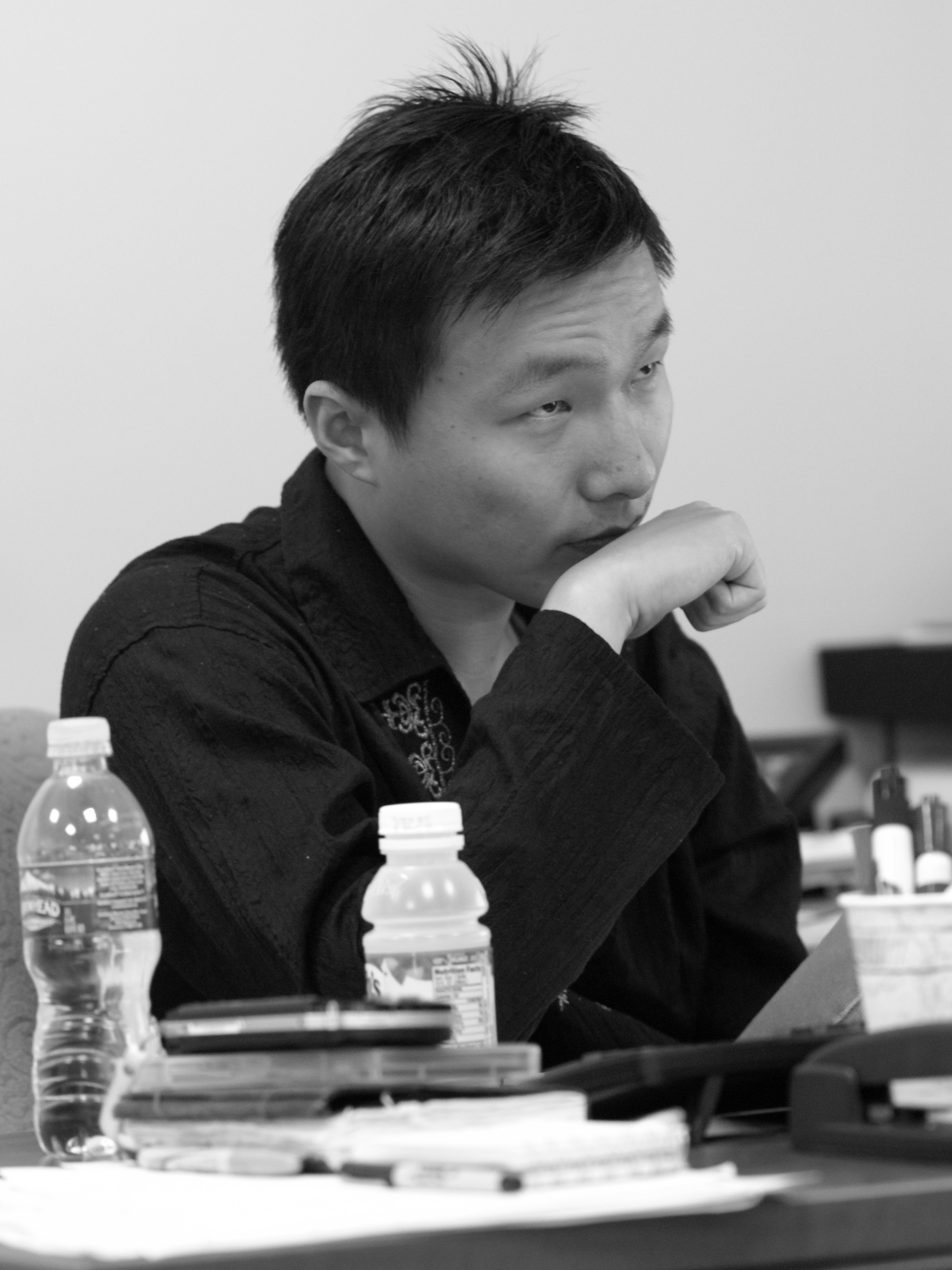
Jenova Chen, the director of Journey, in 2007

Journey was the last game made under a three-game contract between Thatgamecompany and Sony Computer Entertainment, the first two being ports of their previous game Flow and Flower. Development of the game began in 2009, after the release of Flower. The 18-person development team for Journey was composed mainly of creators of the company's previous games; co-founder Jenova Chen was the creative director and Nick Clark returned as lead designer. Kellee Santiago, producer of Flow and Flower, did not reprise her duties, concentrating instead on her role as the company's president, and was replaced by Robin Hunicke.

When development began, Sony expected the game to be completed in a year, rather than the more than three it finally took. Thatgamecompany always expected to need an extension; according to Hunicke, they believed finishing the game within a year was "unrealistic". Development ended up taking even longer than anticipated, as the team had difficulties paring down their ideas for the game and maintaining efficient communication. Over the course of development the team grew from seven to eighteen people. At the end of the second year, when Sony's extension had run out, the game did not spark the emotions in the player that the team wanted. Sony agreed to another one-year extension, but development ultimately exceeded even that.

The stress of the project led to the feeling there was not enough time or money to complete everything the team wished to, which added to the stress and caused arguments about the design of the game. The developers ended up reducing the overtime they spent on the project to avoid burning out, though it meant further delays and risked the company running out of money as the game neared completion. In a speech at the 16th Annual D.I.C.E. Awards in 2013, Chen admitted the company had indeed been driven to bankruptcy in the final months of development and that some of the developers had gone unpaid at the time. Hunicke described the solution to finally finishing the game as learning to let go of tensions and ideas that could not make it into the game and be "nice to each other".

The game is intended to make the player feel "small" and to give them a sense of awe about their surroundings. The basic idea, as designed by Chen, was to create something that moved beyond the "typical defeat/kill/win mentality" of most video games. The team initially created a prototype named Dragon that involved players trying to draw away a large monster from other players but eventually discarded it after finding it was too easy for players to ignore each other in favor of their own objectives.

The developers designed Journey like a Japanese garden, where they attempted to remove all the elements that did not fit, so the emotions they wanted to evoke would come through. This minimalism is intended to make the game feel intuitive to the player, so they can explore and feel a sense of wonder without direct instructions. The story arc is designed to explicitly follow Joseph Campbell's monomyth theory of narrative, or hero's journey, as well as to represent the stages of life, so as to enhance the emotional connection of the players as they journey together. In his D.I.C.E. speech, Chen noted that 3 of their 25 testers had cried upon completing the game.

The game's desert setting is largely based on the Middle East, and incorporates Arabic culture, art and architecture. Jenova Chen and art director Matt Nava did not want the setting to be too Western or Eastern, so they felt the Middle East was an ideal middle ground. In addition, Journey also incorporates Chinese and Tibetan cultural influences, drawing from Chen's childhood in China.

The multiplayer component of Journey was designed to facilitate cooperation between players without forcing it, and without allowing competition. It is intended to allow the players to feel a connection to other people through exploring with them, rather than talking to them or fighting them. The plan was "to create a game where people felt they are connected with each other, to show the positive side of humanity in them". The developers felt the focus on caring about the other player would be diluted by too many game elements, such as additional goals or tasks, as players would focus on those and "ignore" the other player. They also felt having text or voice communication or showing usernames would allow players' biases and preconceptions to come between them and the other player.

Journey was released on March 13, 2012, for download on the PlayStation Network. A PlayStation Home Game Space, or themed area, based on Journey was released on March 14, 2012, and is similar in appearance to the game. A retail "Collector's Edition" of the game was released on August 28, 2012. In addition to Journey, the disc-based title includes Flow and Flower; creator commentaries, art, galleries, and soundtracks for all three games; non-related minigames; and additional content for the PlayStation 3. In September 2012, Sony and Thatgamecompany released a hardcover book entitled The Art of Journey, by the game's art director Matt Nava, containing pieces of art from the game ranging from concept art to final game graphics.

On July 21, 2015, Journey was released on the PlayStation Network for the PlayStation 4, ported by United Kingdom studio Tricky Pixels; owners of the digital PlayStation 3 version of the game were able to download the new version for free. The PlayStation 4 version of the game features improved graphics over the original, with a higher resolution and frame rate and improved texture quality. According to Tricky Pixels, the original PlayStation 3 game was "a masterpiece of PlayStation 3 programming" and porting the game to the PlayStation 4 was "an immense technical challenge". Annapurna Interactive published ports of Journey for Windows and iOS in 2019, developed by Inline Assembly.

=== Music ===
Journey Original Soundtrack

Soundtrack album by Austin Wintory
- Released: April 10, 2012 (digital); October 9, 2012 (physical)
- Studio: Studio M1, Skopje
- Genre: Video game soundtrack
- Length: 58:34
- Label: Sony Computer Entertainment
- Producers: Austin Wintory; Keith Leary; Monty Mudd

The music in Journey was composed and orchestrated by Austin Wintory, who had previously worked with Thatgamecompany on the soundtrack for Flow. Wintory worked closely on the soundtrack with sound designer Steve Johnson, as well as the programming team, so the music would dynamically tie in to both the actions of the player and to sound effects caused by nearby game objects, and feel as if it were "unfolding in real time". Johnson felt having short pieces of music that looped without reacting to the player would be a "missed opportunity", and wanted to create music that changed while still containing a composed emotional arc. Jenova Chen met with Wintory at the start of the game's development to describe his vision for the project, and Wintory left the meeting and created the core of the main theme before he reached his car, and composed and recorded the main cello theme for the soundtrack that night. He continued to work on the soundtrack for the next three years in a collaboration with the development team; he would create a track, which the team would use while creating an area in the game, and Wintory would play the section while revising the music and then send it back. Wintory spent time experimenting and discarding many ideas; while the first track, "Nascence", came easily, the final track, "Apotheosis", went through several widely varied attempts.

Unlike many games, where different songs have different themes for each character or area, Wintory chose to base all the pieces on one theme which stood for the player and their journey, with cello solos especially representing the player. Wintory describes the music as "like a big cello concerto where you are the soloist and all the rest of the instruments represent the world around you", though he describes it as not necessarily orchestral due to the inclusion of electronic aspects. The cello begins the game as "immersed in a sea of electronic sound", before first emerging on its own and then merging into a full orchestra, mirroring the player's journey to the mountain. Whenever the player meets another person, harps and viola are dynamically incorporated into the music. While the game's art style is based on several different cultures, Wintory tried to remove any overt cultural influences from the music to make it "as universal and culture-less as possible". Tina Guo features as the cellist for the soundtrack. She is a close friend of Wintory and has performed "Woven Variations" with him, an eight-minute live orchestral variation on the Journey soundtrack. All the non-electronic instruments in the soundtrack were recorded with the Macedonia Radio Symphonic Orchestra in Skopje, North Macedonia. A "Woven Variations" performance influenced the ending of the game: at the conclusion of development, Wintory was having difficulty with the ending to "Apotheosis", the final track of the game, while the development team was unsure how to end the player's journey at the top of the mountain. While they were planning a large, dramatic conclusion to both, in the concert Wintory had the orchestra fall away at the end of the piece to showcase Guo's cello performance. Inspired, Wintory and the team ended "Apotheosis" and the game the same way, with the game world fading away to leave only the player.

The soundtrack was released as an album on April 10 on iTunes and the PlayStation Network. The album is a collection of the soundtrack's "most important" pieces, arranged by Wintory to stand alone without the context of the player's actions. The album comprises 18 tracks and is over 58 minutes long. It features the voice of Lisbeth Scott for the final track, "I Was Born for This". After its release, the soundtrack reached the top 10 of the iTunes Soundtrack charts in more than 20 countries. It also reached No. 116 on the Billboard sales charts, with over 4000 units sold in its first week after release, the second-highest position of any video game music album to date. The soundtrack was released as a physical album by Sumthing Else Music Works on October 9, 2012. In 2012 Wintory released a download-only album of music on Bandcamp titled Journey Bonus Bundle, which includes variations on themes from Journey and Flow. The soundtrack itself was subsequently released on Bandcamp on June 19, 2013. An album of piano arrangements titled Transfiguration was released on May 1, 2014, on Bandcamp as both a digital and a physical album. A two-record vinyl version of the album was released in 2015.

In January 2016, Wintory started a Kickstarter for a Journey Live concert tour, in which the fifteen-piece Fifth House Ensemble from Chicago will perform the music from the game while a player works their way through the game. The ensemble will react to the player's actions, using a specially-scored version of the soundtrack, composed by Patrick O'Malley with Wintory's oversight, that breaks the music into small pieces to enable this reaction. Wintory had wanted to do a performance of the Journey soundtrack in this interactive manner but did not have the time to rework the soundtrack for this purpose. Wintory came to know Dan Visconti, the composer for Fifth House Ensemble, after Visconti published his praise for the Journey soundtrack and had encouraged other members of the ensemble to play the game. The group saw how Journey's soundtrack had been used for various Video Games Live concerts and believed they could pull off Wintory's vision of an interactive concert, doing most of the reworking of the soundtrack under Wintory's direction. Sony provided Wintory with a modified version of the game with the music disabled for the concert performance. The Kickstarter was launched for $9,000 in funding for a four-city tour, but within a few days already surpassed its funding levels, allowing for more cities to be included.

In March 2022, on the game's tenth anniversary, Wintory released a re-arranged version of Journey's soundtrack for a full orchestra performed by the London Symphony Orchestra, the London Voice choir, and cellist Tina Guo. Titled Traveller: A Journey Symphony, Wintory re-imagined elements of the soundtrack to use a larger set of instruments and players and a greater number of vocalists, taking the number of performers from around 30 on the original soundtrack to around 130, while trying to stay true to the original compositions. The album was funded and co-produced by Wintory and Andrea Pessino, co-founder of video game developer Ready at Dawn, for whose games Wintory has composed. It was released as a digital album and on vinyl. On 1 August 2022 Excerpts from Traveller – A Journey Symphony, lasting 15 mins, was performed at the BBC Proms, Royal Albert Hall, London.

== Reception ==
Reception

Aggregate score
Aggregator	Score
Metacritic	PS3: 92/100; PS4: 92/100

Review scores
Publication	Score
Edge	8/10
Eurogamer	9/10
Game Informer	9.0/10
GameSpot	PS3: 9.0/10; PS4: 10/10
IGN	PS3: 9.0/10; PS4: 9.0/10
PlayStation Official Magazine – UK	10/10
TouchArcade	iOS: 4.5/5
Wired	9/10

Awards
Publication	Award
PlayStation Official Magazine – UK	5th best PS3 game of all time
Push Square	#1 soundtrack of the decade (2010–2019)

Journey received critical and commercial success worldwide. After its release, it became the fastest-selling game to date on PlayStation Store in both North America and Europe. At E3 2011, prior to release, the game won awards for best downloadable game from 1UP.com, GameSpy, and GameTrailers. After publication, the game was heavily honored at end of the year awards. Journey was selected as the best game of the year by IGN and GameSpot, among others. Journey was an Interactive Narrative and Game + Play 2021 Peabody Award Winner.

The soundtrack was nominated for the Best Score Soundtrack for Visual Media at the 2013 Grammy Awards, the first video game soundtrack to be nominated for that category, though it did not win. Additionally, the game won the award for best music and was nominated for the best graphics award from IGN, and was selected as the best PlayStation Network game by GameSpot. At the Spike Video Game Awards, Journey won awards as the best PlayStation 3 game, the best indie game, and the game with the best music, and was additionally nominated for game of the year, best downloadable game, best graphics, and best song in a game for "I Was Born For This". It received the 2013 Annie Award for video game animation. It won five awards at the 2013 British Academy of Film and Television Arts awards: Artistic Achievement, Audio Achievement, Game Design, Online Multiplayer, and Original Music, and was nominated for Best Game, Game Innovation and Story. In March 2013, it won six awards at the annual Game Developers Choice Awards: Best Audio, Best Game Design, Best Visual Arts, Best Downloadable Game, the Innovation Award, and Game of the Year. At the 16th Annual D.I.C.E. Awards, Journey won eight awards, the most honors received at the ceremony, which included "Game of the Year", "Outstanding Innovation in Gaming", "Casual Game of the Year", and outstanding achievement in "Game Direction", "Art Direction", "Online Gameplay", "Original Music Composition", and "Sound Design"; it was additionally nominated for "Downloadable Game of the Year", and outstanding achievement in "Gameplay Engineering" and "Story".

Journey received high acclaim from critics who praised the visual and auditory art direction as well as the emotional response playing with a stranger created. It received the IGN Best Overall Game Award for 2012 and Ryan Clements of IGN described the game as "the most beautiful game of its time", saying, "each moment is like a painting, expertly framed and lit". Jane Douglas of GameSpot concurred, calling it "relentlessly beautiful" and lauding the visual diversity of the world and the depiction of the rippling sand; Matt Miller of Game Informer added praise for the animation of the sand and creatures, saying the game was visually stunning. The music was also complimented, with Miller describing it as a "breathtaking musical score" and Douglas calling it "moving, dynamic music".

Reviewers were especially pleased with the emotional experience of playing the game, particularly with other players. Christian Donlan of Eurogamer described it as a "non-denominational religious experience" that, with the addition of another player, moves beyond metaphors and becomes a "pilgrimage" to the player. A reviewer writing for Edge magazine said the emotional arc of the game hits with "occasionally startling power", while Patrick Shaw from Wired said the game made him feel a "wide range of emotions ... wonder, fear, even sadness". Miller said all three times he played the game, "each time, without fail, individual moments... managed to give me goosebumps, and those moments have remained on my mind for weeks afterward". Joel Gregory of PlayStation Official Magazine praised the game's story for being open to the player's interpretation, leaving an ambiguity that drew him in. The addition of an unnamed second player was described by Donlan as brilliant and as a "master stroke", and Edge said it made for "a more absorbing, more atmospheric experience". In 2019, Journey was ranked 48th on The Guardian newspaper's The 50 Best Video Games of the 21st Century list.

The few criticisms for the game centered on its length and pacing. Clements noted that not all players would appreciate a game with a "deliberate, melancholic pace" and short duration, comments echoed by the Edge review. Miller noted the lack of complex gameplay elements in Journey, and Shaw was disappointed that the game was only a few hours long, though Douglas said the length was perfect. Mikhail Madnani of TouchArcade noted some audio and control issues on the iOS version but otherwise called the game "a must play". Miller concluded the game could be compared to "a musical concert, a well-directed film, or a long-awaited book", while Clements concluded, "completing Journey will create memories that last for years".
