= John Hight =

American video game producer and executive

- Occupations: Video game producer, executive
- Years active: 1990s–present
- Employer: Hasbro
- Known for: World of Warcraft, Diablo III, God of War III, Command & Conquer: Red Alert 2
- Title: President of Wizards of the Coast and Digital Gaming
- Predecessor: Cynthia Williams

John Hight is an American video game producer and executive. He is the president of Wizards of the Coast and Digital Gaming at Hasbro. He previously held senior roles at Blizzard Entertainment, Sony Computer Entertainment, Electronic Arts, and Atari. Hight's production and design credits span franchises such as World of Warcraft, Diablo III, God of War, Command & Conquer, and Magic: The Gathering.

== Career ==
Hight began his career in the early 1990s at the 3DO Company and joined Electronic Arts in 1996 as executive producer and director of design. While at EA and Westwood Studios, he served as director of design, and CG director on Command & Conquer: Red Alert 2 and its expansion Yuri's Revenge.

In 2005, Hight joined Sony Computer Entertainment America as director of product development. He led internal development at Santa Monica Studio, overseeing God of War III. He also led development on the first generation of games for the PlayStation Network and was responsible for signing early titles from thatgamecompany, including Flow, where he served as executive producer. In 2011, Hight joined Blizzard Entertainment as senior producer on World of Warcraft: Mists of Pandaria. He later became executive producer and general manager for the Warcraft franchise, overseeing development and business operations for World of Warcraft, Hearthstone, Warcraft Rumble, and Warcraft III: Reforged. He also directed production on Diablo III: Reaper of Souls and was involved in the removal of the in-game auction house.

In 2024, Hight was appointed President of Wizards of the Coast and Digital Gaming at Hasbro, where he leads strategy and development across tabletop and digital platforms. Under Hight's leadership, Wizards of the Coast reported its most successful fiscal year in 2025, with division revenue growing 45% year-over-year to approximately $2.2 billion. Magic: The Gathering achieved record annual revenues of $1.72 billion, a 59% increase over the prior year, driven by the Universes Beyond product line and crossover sets including Avatar: The Last Airbender and Final Fantasy.

On July 28, 2026, Hasbro informed in a filing with the U.S. Securities and Exchange Commission that Hight would step down as president of Wizards of the Coast, effective September 1, 2026. He will remain with the company for one year as an advisor to the chief executive officer. The announcement was made alongside Hasbro's second-quarter 2026 financial results. During the quarter, Magic: The Gathering generated $545.3 million in revenue, exceeding $500 million in quarterly revenue for the first time and accounting for approximately 48 percent of Hasbro's $1.14 billion in quarterly revenue.
