= Chambara (video game) =

2016 stealth video game

- Developer: Team OK
- Publisher: USC Games Publishing
- Director: Kevin Wong
- Designers: Esteban Fajardo; Alec Faulkner
- Artist: Catherine Fox
- Engine: Unity
- Platforms: PlayStation 4; macOS; Windows
- Release: PlayStation 4 July 26, 2016; Mac, Windows; December 12, 2017
- Genre: Stealth
- Mode: Multiplayer

Chambara is a stealth game developed by Team OK and published by USC Games Publishing. It was released on July 26, 2016, for PlayStation 4, and on December 12, 2017, for Windows and macOS.

It received mixed reviews from critics, who praised the art style and gameplay, but criticized its lack of features. The game was nominated for an IGF Award and won a BAFTA Ones to Watch Award in 2015. It was also an official selection at Indiecade.

== Gameplay ==
The game is entirely local multiplayer and each player controls their own anthropomorphic bird samurai character. The world is purely made of black-and-white parts, allowing characters to hide in plain sight due to their solid black and white colors. Players can also throw a single throwing star (which colors the enemy and makes them visible), and also air dash. One hit by the player's kendo stick results in the enemy character's death, similar to Bushido Blade. By pressing L2, the character's eyes can be squinted or closed to prevent screen-watching.

== Development ==
The game was developed by students at USC Interactive Media & Games Division. It was created to be played in a college dorm, leading to its couch-based multiplayer focus. The game's art style was inspired by Samurai Jack, Akira Kurosawa films, 20th-century Japanese art, and Mono-Ha and Metabolism architecture.

The game's characters were changed from humans to birds and blood to feathers because of fears that it would be too violent to be shown in festivals with young children. Having the player easily navigate the world and see the UI was a challenge due to the black-and-white nature of the art style.

== Reception ==
Chambara received the 2015 BAFTA Ones to Watch Award, which celebrates new talent and innovation in the video games industry, and was chosen by IndieCade as a festival selected in fall of 2015. In 2016, it received the IGF nomination for Best Student Game at the Game Developers Conference in San Francisco.

The game received mixed reviews from critics, with an aggregate score of 71/100 on Metacritic.

Chris Carter of Destructoid rated the game 75/100, saying that "it does one thing, and it does it pretty well". He said that "there's enough here to keep most people interested, so long as they have a steady stream of friends (or a roommate/significant other) to play with".

Chad Sapieha of the Financial Post rated the game 70/100, saying that while the idea of the game was "fantastic", the idea was "underdeveloped" and would only deliver a "few hours" of fun before "growing stale".
