= Thatgamecompany =

American video game developer

Thatgamecompany, Inc.
- Formerly: Thatgamecompany, LLC (2006–2012)
- Company type: Private
- Industry: Video games
- Founded: May 15, 2006; 19 years ago
- Founder: Jenova Chen; Kellee Santiago
- Headquarters: Santa Monica, California, U.S.
- Key people: Jenova Chen (president, creative director)
- Number of employees: 51–200
- Website: thatgamecompany.com

Thatgamecompany, Inc. (stylized as thatgamecompany) is an American independent video game development company founded by University of Southern California students Jenova Chen and Kellee Santiago in 2006. The company was a developer for Sony Computer Entertainment, contracted to create three downloadable games for the PlayStation 3's PlayStation Network service, and has since secured independent funding. The first of its games is a remake of Chen's award-winning Flash title Flow, with enhanced visuals and sound, added multiplayer modes and compatibility with the PlayStation 3's motion-sensitive controller. The title was released on the PlayStation Store in 2007. The company's second PlayStation 3 game, Flower, was released on the PlayStation Store in 2009, and its third game, Journey, was released in March 2012 on the PlayStation Store. Its fourth game, Sky: Children of the Light, was released in July 2019 on iOS and in April 2020 on Android, followed by the Nintendo Switch in June 2021, PlayStation 4 in December 2022, and Windows in April 2024.

According to Chen, the company focuses on creating video games that provoke emotional responses from players. He has stated that, while the company is not opposed to making action-oriented games, he believes that enough such titles are released by the established video game industry. When designing a game, Chen and Thatgamecompany's process is to start by mapping out what the game should make the player feel, rather than by establishing game mechanics. Chen has stated that the company does not plan to produce large, blockbuster titles, due to its belief that the pressure for high sales would stifle innovation.

== History ==
In late 2005, Jenova Chen and Kellee Santiago began thinking about creating their own video game company. The two were in their final year as master's students in the Interactive Media Program at the University of Southern California's School of Cinematic Arts, and had just released a video game – Cloud – that they had developed with several other students. The group intended the project as an experiment, meant to reveal whether they could create a game that "expressed something different than video games had in the past", and to determine the public's level of interest in video games of that nature. Due to the game's strongly positive reception, Chen and Santiago began to consider founding their own company, so that they could continue making games like Cloud – in which the design is not based on gameplay mechanics, but on inspiring emotions in players – after they left college.

At the time, digital distribution was gaining popularity. The two saw it as an opportunity to create games without the high financial risk of retail distribution, which they believed would require them to first accumulate funds by working for other video game companies. Thatgamecompany was founded on May 15, 2006, as Chen and Santiago finished their master's degrees. The company soon signed a deal with Sony Computer Entertainment, which had been impressed by Chen's Flash game Flow – a component of his master's thesis at USC. Thatgamecompany was contracted to produce three games for the upcoming PlayStation Network distribution system and was given startup funding and a location at Sony's offices in Los Angeles.

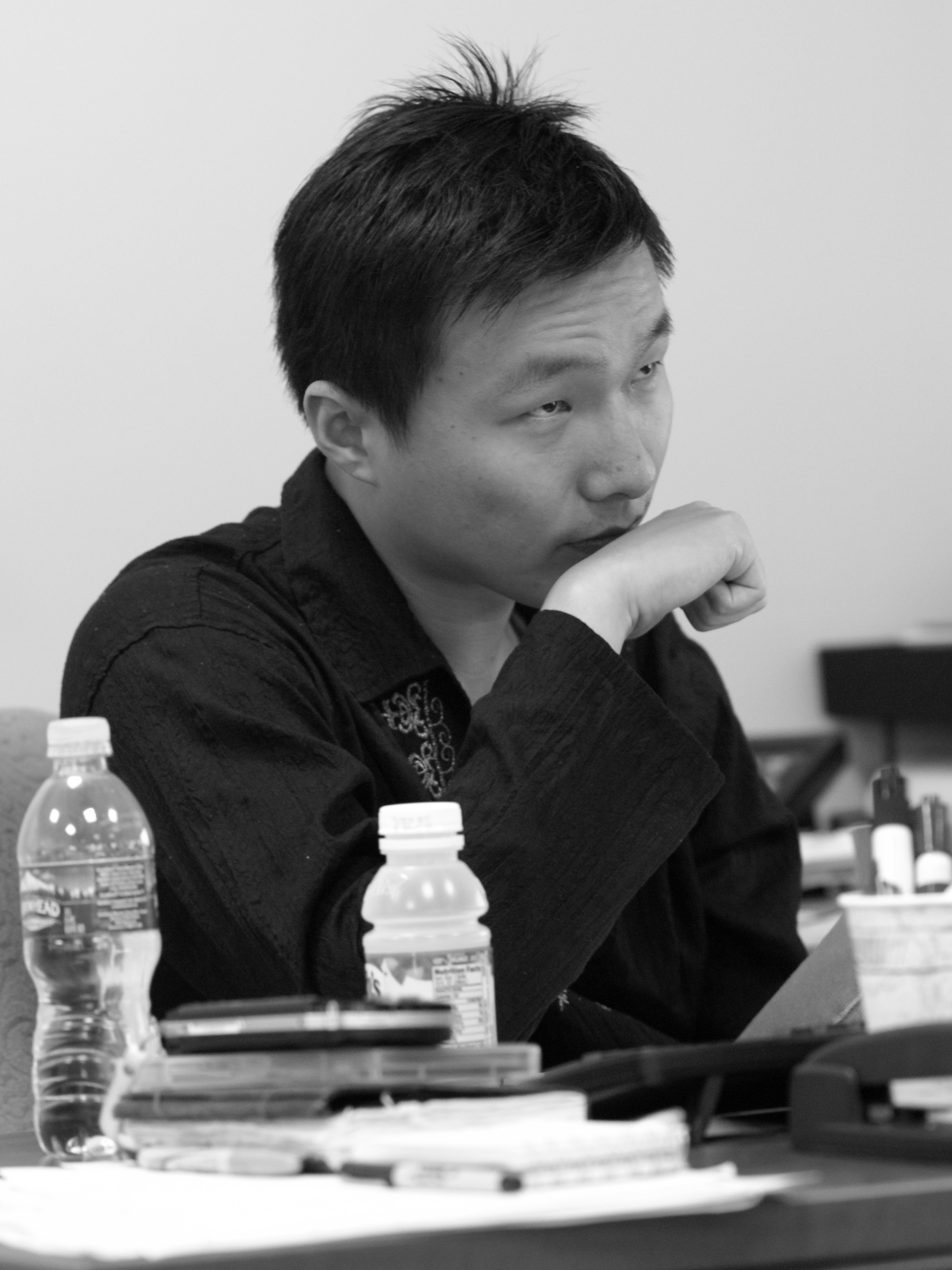
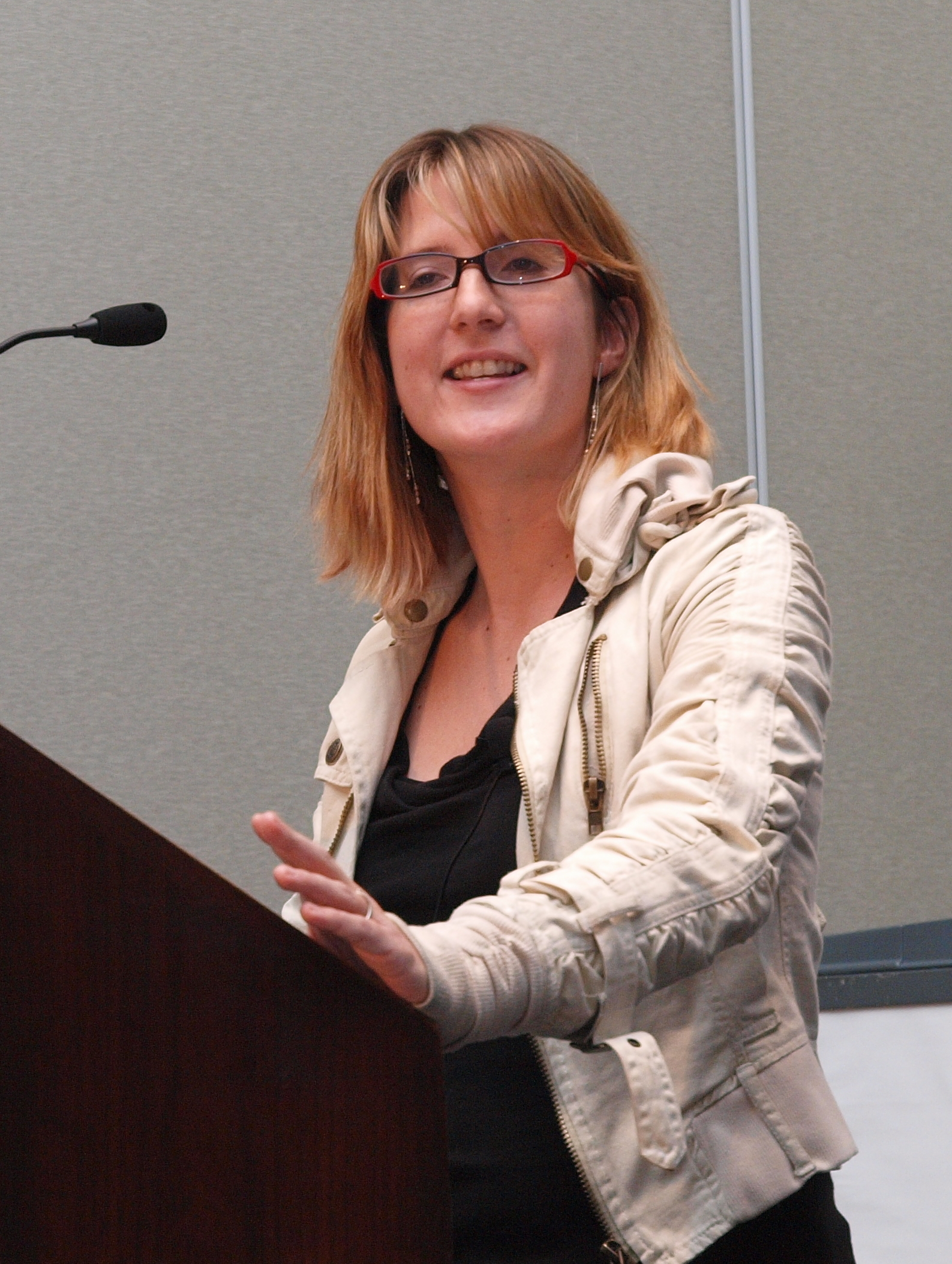
Jenova Chen and Kellee Santiago, the founders of Thatgamecompany

Initially, Thatgamecompany consisted of Chen, Santiago, Nick Clark, who had collaborated with Chen on Flow, and John Edwards. Santiago was the president of the company and the producer for its games, Clark was the designer, and Edwards was the lead engineer. Although Chen cofounded the company, he initially worked at Maxis on the game Spore. The company considered adapting Cloud as their first product for Sony, but instead decided on Flow, as it was "more fleshed-out as a design". They felt that it would be easier than Cloud to develop while they built the company; no members of the team had experience with managing a business or with creating a commercial game. Several contract workers assisted Thatgamecompany with Flow's development, including Austin Wintory, the game's composer.

The company had believed that the PlayStation 3 version of Flow could be completed in four months and that it would be ready for the November 2006 launch of the PlayStation Network. However, when it was released in February 2007, it did not include "half of the original design". According to Santiago, the Sony producer assigned to the team had anticipated that they would underestimate the game's development length, and was not surprised by the delay. The game was well received; it became the most downloaded game on the PlayStation Network in 2007, and was nominated for the Best Downloadable Game of the Year award at the 2008 Academy of Interactive Arts & Sciences Interactive Achievement Awards, and for the Best Innovation award at the 2007 British Academy of Film and Television Arts (BAFTA) awards. After its release, an expansion pack and a PlayStation Portable version of the game were created by SuperVillain Studios. Thatgamecompany was not involved in the development of either project beyond ensuring that they retained the same design and art direction as the original, as they were busy creating their next title, Flower.

Flower was Thatgamecompany's "first game outside the safety net of academia", according to Santiago. Six to nine people were involved at different stages of development. Chen returned to work full-time at the company prior to the game's development and served as the creative director. The game's music was composed by Vincent Diamante, who had worked with Chen and Santiago on Cloud. The game was developed for two years, but the team spent three-fourths of that time in the prototyping stage. After they decided on the game's elements, Flower was produced in only six months. Like Flow, the game was well received when it was released in February 2009, selling in the top ten PlayStation Network titles of the year and garnering several awards. After the release of Flower, Thatgamecompany moved into their own building in Los Angeles.

The company's third project was Journey, which was released on March 13, 2012. It was the final game in Thatgamecompany's three-game contract with Sony and was developed by a team of fourteen. This team did not include Santiago, who, to concentrate on her role as the company's president, was replaced as a producer by Robin Hunicke. The game was in development for three years, despite having been expected to take one year, and the development team faced several problems in expanding the company from seven employees as they began the game to eighteen, and risked running out of money. Upon release, the game achieved both critical and commercial success. It became the fastest-selling game to date on PlayStation Store in North America and Europe. After the game was released, as the company began work on another project, several employees left for other opportunities. Santiago left the company to pursue other ventures, designer Chris Bell left to form his own studio The Willderness, and Hunicke resigned to work at Tiny Speck. Chen attributes the exodus to the end of Thatgamecompany's three-game contract, and to the fact that the company had run out of money, mandating an unpaid hiatus to all employees until the revenue from Journey came in.

Once the money from Journey began to arrive, Thatgamecompany brought back several of the employees affected by the cash flow problems, and some new developers. The company, with its contract with Sony complete, raised $5.5 million in venture capital funding, which they hope to use to develop future games for multiple platforms without influences by publishers. The team then began working on what would become Sky: Children of the Light, and as of June 2013 was made up of around 12 people, only half of whom worked on Journey. Thatgamecompany hoped to release the game on "as many platforms as possible" and to use touch controls as distinctively as its previous games had used controller tilt. On May 27, 2014, it was reported that the game had received $7 million in funding from Capital Today and a team of other investors. While Sky was in development, Thatgamecompany re-released Flow and Flower onto both the PlayStation 4 and the PlayStation Vita, and released an updated port of Journey for the PlayStation 4. Sky, a free-to-play multiplayer adventure game, was first released on July 18, 2019. Since its release, thatgamecompany has focused on supporting it.

In March 2020, Thatgamecompany announced plans to open a second studio in the San Francisco and Silicon Valley area in 2020, primarily to support Sky; these plans were cancelled due to the COVID-19 pandemic. In March 2022, it announced that it had received a $160 million investment and had taken on Pixar co-founder Edwin Catmull as an advisor. Chen also announced that the studio was working on its fifth game, which he described as "like a theme park" and "the most ambitious game I have built".

== Philosophy ==
When Thatgamecompany designs a game, it begins by deciding on the emotions and feelings it wishes to invoke in the player. This differs from the approach of most developers, who build from game mechanics or genre features. According to Santiago, the company creates emotional responses to demonstrate the wide range of possible experiences in video games, which she believes is larger than the few – excitement and fear, for example – that are typically presented. Chen has said that the company's games are meant to evoke emotions more than a message; he specifically changed the design of Flower when early testers felt that the game promoted green energy. Chen believes that he is "too young" to make a game with a strong message, and so designs the company's products to avoid overt meanings. Santiago has said that Thatgamecompany's goal is "to create games that push the boundaries of videogames as a communicative medium, and to create games that appeal to a wide variety of people". She hopes to change the video game industry with this process, so that other companies approach video games as a "creative medium" instead of a mass product.

Thatgamecompany's employees are not opposed to making action titles, and, as a break from their regular projects, have internally created "exciting" games that were well received by Sony. However, Chen believes that there is no reason for the company to commercially produce such games, as they would not be creating new ideas that justified the cost of remaining an independent studio, as opposed to working for existing game developers. Similarly, Chen does not intend for Thatgamecompany to make "big budget blockbuster games", as he believes that the financial pressure would stifle innovation.

== Games ==
In Flow, the player navigates a series of two-dimensional planes with an aquatic microorganism that evolves by consuming other microorganisms. The game's design is based on Chen's research into dynamic difficulty adjustment at the University of Southern California, and on psychologist Mihaly Csikszentmihalyi's theoretical concept of mental immersion or flow. It was released for the PlayStation 3 on February 22, 2007.

Flower was intended as a spiritual successor to Flow. Using the PlayStation 3's motion-sensitive controller, the player controls wind that blows a flower petal through the air. Flying close to flowers results in the player's petal being followed by other flower petals. Approaching flowers may also have side-effects on the game world, such as bringing vibrant color to previously dead fields or activating stationary windmills. The game features no text or dialogue, forming a narrative arc primarily through visual representation and emotional cues. It was released for the PlayStation 3 on February 12, 2009.

In Journey, the player controls a robed figure who wakes up in a desert, with a large mountain in the distance as their destination. While traveling, the player can encounter other players over the Internet, one at a time. Players cannot communicate verbally, but may help each other or not as they wish. The game was released for the PlayStation 3 on March 13, 2012. Austin Wintory was nominated for a Grammy Award in 2013 for Best Score Soundtrack for Journey, the first such nomination for a full video game score, but lost to Trent Reznor and Atticus Ross for The Girl with the Dragon Tattoo. It was released on Windows in 2019.

Sky: Children of the Light is Thatgamecompany's latest game, released for iOS on July 18, 2019, and on Android on April 7, 2020, is intended as a spiritual successor to all of its previous games. In Sky, the player explores a magical kingdom using a cape that gives them the ability to fly. Players play alongside millions of other players, connected via the internet. There are seven unique realms to explore, and each one is themed around a different stage of life. In addition to these realms, there is a Home that serves as a hub between the different realms. Throughout the game, the player will encounter "spirits" that give the player cosmetic and gameplay-affecting items in return for in-game currency. Sky is a free-to-play game, with cosmetic items and in-game currency available for purchase as microtransactions. Sky was chosen as Apple's iPhone Game of the Year in 2019, and reached 100 million installations in May 2021. It was released on the Nintendo Switch in 2021, on the PlayStation 4 on December 6, 2022, and in early access for Windows through Steam on April 10, 2024.

Games
Title	Year	Publisher(s)	Platform(s)							
Title	Year	Publisher(s)	PS3	PS4	PSP	PS Vita	iOS	Android	Windows	Switch
Flow	2006	Thatgamecompany (Browser) Sony Interactive Entertainment (Console)	Yes	Yes	Yes	Yes	No	No	Yes	No
Flower	2009	Sony Interactive Entertainment; Annapurna Interactive (iOS and PC)	Yes	Yes	No	Yes	Yes	No	Yes	No
Journey	2012	Sony Interactive Entertainment; Annapurna Interactive (iOS and PC)	Yes	Yes	No	No	Yes	No	Yes	No
Sky: Children of the Light	2019	Thatgamecompany	No	Yes	No	No	Yes	Yes	Yes	Yes
