= Cloud (video game) =

2005 video game

- Publisher: USC Interactive Media Division
- Producer: Kellee Santiago
- Designers: Jenova Chen; Stephen Dinehart; Kellee Santiago; Vincent Diamante; Aaron Meyers; Erik Nelson; Glenn Song
- Composer: Vincent Diamante
- Platform: Windows
- Release: October 24, 2005
- Genre: Puzzle
- Mode: Single-player

Cloud is a 2005 puzzle video game developed by a team of students in the University of Southern California's (USC) Interactive Media Program. The team began development of the game for Microsoft Windows in January 2005 with a US$20,000 grant from the USC Game Innovation Lab; the game was released as a free download that October. By July 2006, the hosting website had received 6 million visits, and the game had been downloaded 600,000 times.

The game centers on a boy who dreams of flying while asleep in a hospital bed. The concept was partially based on lead designer Jenova Chen's childhood; he was often hospitalized for asthma and would daydream while alone in his room. Assuming the role of the boy, the player flies through a dream world and manipulates clouds to solve puzzles. The game was intended to spark emotions in the player that the video game industry usually ignored.

Cloud won the Best Student Philosophy award at the 2006 Slamdance Guerrilla Games Competition, and a Student Showcase award at the 2006 Independent Games Festival. The game was received well by critics, who cited its visuals, music, and relaxing atmosphere as high points. Chen and producer Kellee Santiago went on to co-found the studio Thatgamecompany, which has considered remaking Cloud as a commercial video game.

== Gameplay ==
A screenshot of the boy flying in the sky. Above him black clouds and white clouds that the player has moved are combining to form rain.

Cloud, a single-player video game for Microsoft Windows, centers on a boy who dreams of flying through the sky while asleep in a hospital bed. The player assumes control of the sleeping boy's avatar—the projection of the boy into his dream world—and guides him through his dream of a small group of islands with a light gathering of clouds. The avatar's direction and speed are controlled with a mouse; movement is generally on a horizontal plane, but vertical flight can be attained by holding down the third button of the mouse. The player may interact with clouds only while flying horizontally.

The game contains three types of clouds: white clouds, which follow the avatar; gray, neutral clouds, which become white when touched; and black clouds, which may be combined with white clouds to cause rain, dissolving both clouds. A large number of white clouds more easily dissolves a small number of dark clouds than an equal number, and vice versa. White clouds stop following the avatar if the player moves too quickly and they resume following if approached again. Each of the four missions in Cloud has a different objective, including forming patterns in the sky with clouds, eliminating black clouds, and creating rain over each of the islands.

== Development ==
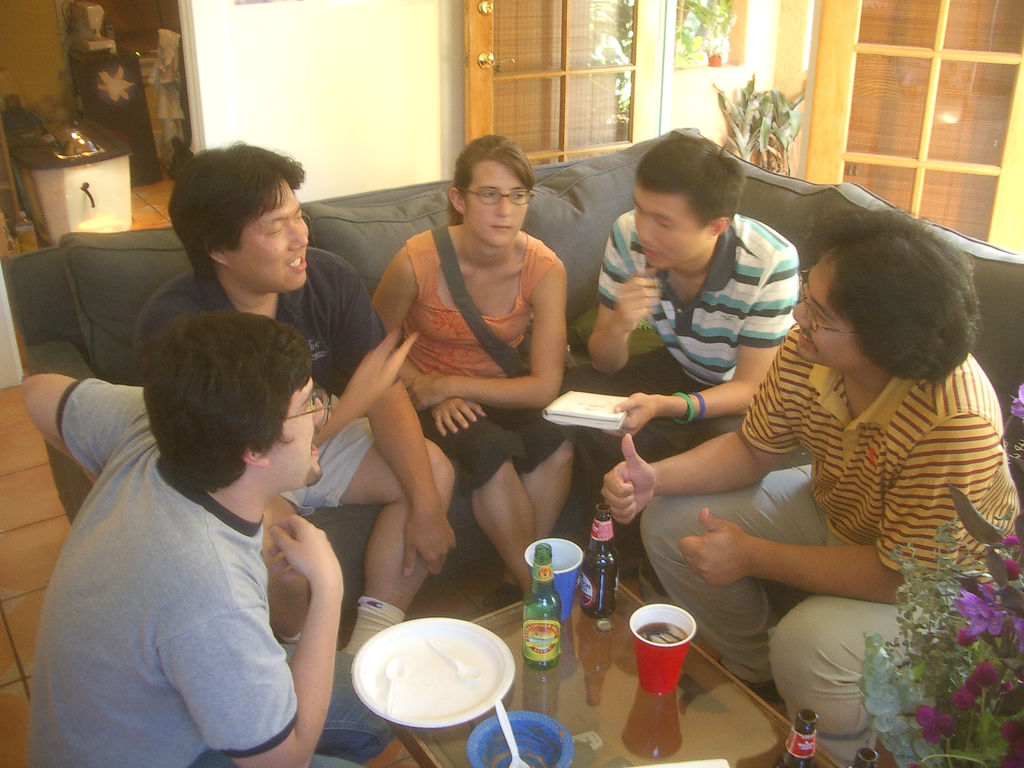
Members of Cloud's development team. From left to right: Erik Nelson, Glenn Song, Kellee Santiago, Jenova Chen, and Vincent Diamante.

Cloud was designed and released in 2005 by a team of seven students in the Interactive Media master's degree program at the USC School of Cinematic Arts. The game was made as a funded research project in the USC Game Innovation Lab. Development began in January 2005 and the game was released in late October, receiving its final update in December. The group was headed by Jenova Chen and included Stephen Dinehart, Erik Nelson, Aaron Meyers, Glenn Song, composer Vincent Diamante, producer Kellee Santiago and advisor Tracy Fullerton, director of the Game Innovation Lab. The game won the 2005 Game Innovation Grant of $20,000 from the lab, which was intended to support the production of experimental games.

Chen had the first idea for the game; while walking to school one day he looked up at the sky, noticing the difference between the fluffy clouds there and the "polluted and gray" clouds of Shanghai where he was born, and thought about making a game about clouds. It was given a story to "create the premise and help player to be emotionally invested"; however, the team avoided making the story too strong, as it would "distract the player from the core experience" of flying freely and shaping clouds. In the early stages of development, the game had an involved backstory about an alien who attempts to clean up the environment. The group's managing professor, however, challenged them to have a child as the protagonist rather than an alien or mad scientist, to which Chen, who needed the funding to continue at school, quickly agreed.

The story was then cut down to "a simple 'poetic' introduction to the cloud child trapped in a hospital bed". The child was partially based on Chen's childhood experience, as he was often hospitalized for asthma and would daydream while waiting for the doctors. According to Chen, Cloud was designed to "expand the spectrum of emotions video games evoke". The team intended Cloud to "communicate a feeling of youthfulness, freedom, and the wonder of imagination". It was built on a modified version of a game engine developed by several team members for their previous game, Dyadin. At the 2006 Game Developers Conference student showcase, Chen and Santiago pitched Cloud to Sony representative John Hight as the first game in the "Zen" genre. Hight was interested, but Sony declined to publish the game.

== Reception and legacy ==
Cloud won the Best Student Philosophy award for artistic achievement at the Slamdance Guerrilla Games Competition and a Student Showcase award at the Independent Games Festival. It was featured on Spike TV, G4TV, and CBS Sunday. The game immediately received a great deal of attention when it was released; site traffic overran the server that hosted the website, and then crashed those of the school. By February 2006, just over three months after the game's release, the website had been viewed over one million times and the game downloaded over 300,000 times. By July 2006, it had reached six million visits and 600,000 downloads.

The game received positive reviews from critics. Joel Durham, Jr. of GameSpy claimed that "everything about Cloud is simply jaw-dropping", and cited its music, visuals, and sensation of flying as high points. William Usher of Game Tunnel also praised the visuals and audio: he believed that its graphics created a relaxing atmosphere, and that the "touching musical score" would emotionally move any player. A reviewer for Game Informer said that the game pointed "to a bright future" in which games would inspire a wider range of emotions; however, the writer called Cloud more of an "experience" than a game. Ron White of PC World similarly called it "the most relaxing experience I've ever had that involved a computer". Durham concluded that Cloud "would set your mind free".

Chen and Santiago went on to co-found the video game studio Thatgamecompany. Composer Vincent Diamante and Erik Nelson worked for the company on its second game, Flower. Thatgamecompany considered remaking Cloud as a commercial video game, but said in 2008 that it would only do so if the staff could not conceive any other game ideas.
