= Adam Sulzdorf-Liszkiewicz =

American game designer and educator

Adam Sulzdorf-Liszkiewicz is an American designer and educator, who teaches at Michigan State University. He has designed both virtual reality and serious games.

== History ==
Sulzdorf-Liszkiewicz received an MFA from SUNY Buffalo and a PhD from the USC Interactive Media & Games Division. He has taught game design and theory at the University of California, Los Angeles. As a student, he developed a theory about popular games, specifically FarmVille, as a cultural phenomenon.

== Theory of Virtual Reality ==
Sulzdorf-Liszkiewicz has connected Absurdism with virtual reality (VR) as part of the philosophy regarding human imagination in VR environments. He has referenced the absurdist Fluxus art movement in this theory. He has also discussed the importance of Relational Aesthetics in VR, emphasizing human-to-human relationships outside the VR headset as crucial to the experience.

Sulzdorf-Liszkiewicz designed the VR game Hot Dogs, Horseshoes & Hand Grenades, released in 2017.
