= Chris Swain (soccer) =

British-born American soccer player

Personal information
- Place of birth: Surrey, England
- Position: Goalkeeper

Senior career*
Years	Team	Apps	(Gls)
1974–1975	Cleveland Cobras		
1976	Chicago Cats		
- * Club domestic league appearances and goals

Chris Swain is a retired English-born American soccer goalkeeper.

In 1974 and 1975, Swain played for the Cleveland Cobras in the American Soccer League. In 1976, he moved to the Chicago Cats.
