= Chris Swain (professor) =

American video game designer and entrepreneur

- Occupations: Entrepreneur, game Designer
- Known for: Co-founding the EA Game Innovation Lab
- Board member of: Academy of Television Arts & Sciences (2000–2004); Figma Education Advisory Board

Academic work
- Discipline: Innovation, Venture Development, Game Design
- Institutions: University of Southern California; R/GA Interactive; Spiderdance, Inc.

Chris Swain is an American academic and entrepreneur. He is a professor at the University of Southern California (USC) Iovine and Young Academy (IYA), where he teaches courses on innovation and leadership, including disruptive innovation, product validation, and venture development. At IYA, he led development of the Venture Pyramid scoring system and the Innovation Quest student ventures program. Swain is also leader of IYA's Business of Innovation curriculum pathway and the joint Bachelor of Science degree in Business of Innovation (BUIN) with the USC Marshall School of Business. He serves on the Education Advisory Board of the design software company Figma.

== Academic and professional work ==
Before joining IYA, Swain co-founded and directed the Electronic Arts Game Innovation Lab at USC, where he researched methodologies for user engagement using playable systems and the principles of intrinsic motivation. The lab's projects received support from organizations including the National Science Foundation, the National Institutes of Health, the Gates Foundation, the Rockefeller Foundation, the Annenberg Foundation, and the U.S. Department of State. He was also a founding faculty member of the USC Games program.

Swain has spoken on innovation and startups at academic and professional venues such as the Massachusetts Institute of Technology, Harvard University, the University of Cambridge, Columbia University, DARPA, the University of Tokyo, the Sorbonne, Carnegie Mellon University, and City University of Hong Kong. His work has been covered by media outlets including The New York Times, The Washington Post, Los Angeles Times, The Chicago Tribune, CNN, NPR, Forbes, and Wired.

== Career ==
Swain began his career at Robert Abel's, Synapse Technologies, an interactive software company funded by IBM that produced multimedia works including Columbus: Discovery Encounter and Beyond, which is on permanent display at the Library of Congress. He later became a founding member of R/GA Interactive, where he led initiatives for organizations that include Intel, IBM, Disney, RAND, NASDAQ, BBC, and many others. R/GA was recognized by the Webby Awards one of the "30 Most Iconic Companies in Internet History" in 2025.

At USC, Swain directed the Electronic Arts Game Innovation Lab, where projects included The Redistricting Game (2006), an educational simulation about gerrymandering that has been used in schools and civic engagement campaigns. He co-authored version 1 of the book Game Design Workshop: Designing, Prototyping, & Playtesting Games (2004), which has been widely adopted in university courses on game design.

In industry, Swain was vice president of programming at Spiderdance, Inc., a participatory television company that raised $8 million in venture capital and produced interactive programs for NBC, Viacom, and Turner Broadcasting. He co-founded Proof of Learn, a Web3 education platform, which announced $16 million in venture funding to support the development of blockchain-based learning tools. He also founded the games studio Talkie, which released Ecotopia (2011), a Facebook-based environmental awareness game.

Swain has advised USC students whose projects have been commercially released, including flOw (Sony PlayStation), The Misadventures of P.B. Winterbottom (2K Games), and Reflection (Konami).

Other projects associated with Swain include SurgeWorld and Immune Attack (2006), which explored health-related topics, and games produced under the Enhanced Learning with Creative Technologies (ELECT) initiative which was funded by the U.S. Department of Defense. and produced simulation games on urbanism and bilateral negotiation. Earlier interactive projects include Netwits for the Microsoft Network Multiplayer Jeopardy!, and Multiplayer Wheel of Fortune for Sony Online, Stickerworld for Children's Television Workshop, and Poetry of Structure, a companion project to Ken Burns’ documentary on Frank Lloyd Wright.

From 2000 to 2004, Swain served on the board of directors of the Academy of Television Arts & Sciences. During this time, he co-chaired the initiative that introduced an Emmy Award category recognizing interactive television.
