= Darfur is Dying =

Video game about the crisis in Darfur, western Sudan

Game title screen

Darfur is Dying is a flash-based browser game about the War in Darfur in western Sudan. The game won the Darfur Digital Activist Contest sponsored by mtvU. Released in April 2006, more than 800,000 people had played by September that year. It is classified as a serious game, specifically a newsgame.

== Development and release ==
The game's design was led by Susana Ruiz as a part of TAKE ACTION games. Then a graduate student at the Interactive Media Program at the School of Cinematic Arts at the University of Southern California, she was inspired to make a game after her nephew told her about a class lesson on the Holocaust that did not mention any modern genocides. She initially proposed a game about the post-Rwandan genocide gacaca trials, for which she was criticized by colleagues who felt that a game was an inappropriate form to approach a serious topic. She was attending the Games for Change conference in New York City in October 2005, at which mtvU announced that they, in partnership with the Reebok Human Rights Foundation and the non-profit International Crisis Group, were launching the Darfur Digital Activist Contest for a game that would also be an advocacy tool about the situation in the Darfur conflict. Given that mtvU was offering funding and other resources, Ruiz decided to change her original idea.

Ruiz formed a design team and spent two months creating a game design document and prototype. The team spent much of the design phase talking to humanitarian aid workers with experience in Darfur and brainstorming how to make a game that was both interesting to play and was an advocacy tool. Ruiz has stated that the game design was influenced by that of Food Force, a 2005 game published by the United Nations World Food Programme. The Ruiz team's beta version was put up for review by the public, along with the other finalists, and was chosen as the winner. The team then received funding to complete the game. The web and application development firm interFUEL was brought in to complete the game design and programming. The game was officially released at a Save Darfur Coalition rally on 30 March 2006 and the first official player was American speed skater Joey Cheek.

== Gameplay ==
The game begins with the player choosing a member of a Darfuri family that has been displaced by the conflict. The first of the two modes of the game begins with the player controlling the family member, in follow mode, from the camp to a well and back, while dodging patrols of the Janjaweed militia. If captured, the player is informed what has happened to their selected character and asked to select another member of the family and try again. If the water is successfully carried back to the camp, the game switches into its second mode - a top down management view of the camp, where the character must use the water for crops and to build huts. When the water runs out the player must return to the water fetching level to progress. The goal is to keep the camp running for seven days.

== Reception ==
The game has been reported by mainstream media sources such as The Washington Post, Time, BBC News and National Public Radio. In an early September 2006 interview, Ruiz stated that it is difficult to determine success for a game with a social goal, but stated that more than 800,000 people had played 1.7 million times since its release, of which tens of thousands had forwarded the game to friends or sent a letter to an elected representative. As of April 2007, the game has been played more than 2.4 million times by over 1.2 million people worldwide. Critics have noted that despite the number of players, the actual crisis was unaffected, and claimed the sole outcome of the game was to give publicity to the game's creators.

The game has been the focus of debate on its nature and impact. Assessments by academics interviewed by the BBC varied between those stating that anything that may spark debate on Darfur and issues surrounding it is a clear gain for the advocates to those, who thought that the game oversimplified a complex situation and thus failed to address the actual issues of the conflict. The game was also criticized for the sponsorship of mtvU, raising the possibility that the game might seem like a marketing tool for the corporation.

While most media coverage of the game has concentrated on its advocacy aspect rather than its gameplay, one review has commented that it is initially unclear in the management mode how to go about growing food and other tasks.
