= Flow (video game) =

2006 indie game

- Logo
- Developer: Thatgamecompany (Note: PlayStation 3 version developed with support from Santa Monica Studio. Ported to PlayStation Portable, PlayStation Vita and PlayStation 4 by SuperVillain Studios.)
- Publishers: Thatgamecompany (browser); Sony Computer Entertainment (console)
- Designers: Jenova Chen; Nicholas Clark
- Composer: Austin Wintory
- Engine: PhyreEngine (console)
- Platforms: Browser; PlayStation 3; PlayStation Portable; PlayStation 4; PlayStation Vita
- Release: March 11, 2006: Browser; March 11, 2006; PlayStation 3; NA: February 22, 2007; PAL: March 23, 2007; PlayStation Portable; NA: March 6, 2008; PAL: April 24, 2008; PlayStation 4; PAL: November 29, 2013; NA: December 17, 2013; PlayStation Vita; PAL: December 4, 2013; NA: December 17, 2013
- Genre: Life simulation
- Modes: Single-player, multiplayer (console versions)

Flow (stylized as flOw) is an indie video game created by Jenova Chen and Nicholas Clark. Originally released as a free Flash game in 2006 to accompany Chen's master's thesis, it was reworked into a 2007 PlayStation 3 game by his development studio, Thatgamecompany, with assistance from Santa Monica Studio. SuperVillain Studios developed a PlayStation Portable version of the game in 2008, and PlayStation 4 and PlayStation Vita versions in 2013. In Flow, the player navigates a series of two-dimensional planes with an aquatic microorganism that grows and evolves by consuming other microorganisms. The game's design is based on Chen's research into dynamic difficulty adjustment at the University of Southern California's Interactive Media Division, and on psychologist Mihaly Csikszentmihalyi's theoretical concept of mental immersion or flow.

The Flash version of Flow received 100,000 downloads within its first two weeks of release, and had been played over 3.5 million times by 2008. Its PlayStation 3 re-release was the most downloaded game on the PlayStation Network in 2007 and won the Best Downloadable Game award at the 2008 Game Developers Choice Awards. It was nominated for awards by the Academy of Interactive Arts & Sciences and the British Academy of Film and Television Arts. Reviewers praised Flow's visual and audio appeal, but noted the simplicity of its gameplay; several considered it to be more of an art piece than a game.

== Gameplay ==
The PlayStation 3 version of Flow, showing the player's creature – a multi-segmented worm-like creature—in the top center of the screen. Small edible creatures can be seen nearby, and a blurred version of the next plane below, featuring two aggressive creatures, can be seen in the background.

In Flow, the player guides a small, multi-segmented worm or snake-like creature through an aquatic environment. There are no menus or guidelines; the game begins immediately. The game world, which is viewed from a top-down perspective, consists of two-dimensional planes stacked vertically upon each other. A blurred version of the layer below appears in the background of each plane. Planes contain organisms of varying sizes; the player's creature automatically attempts to consume them when they are nearby. The majority of these creatures are non-confrontational and are composed of cells that increase the number of segments in the player's creature when eaten. All planes, except for the highest and lowest, contain two specially colored organisms that move the player's creature up or down one plane when touched.

Certain planes feature aggressive, multi-segmented creatures that perish when all their segments are eaten by the player's creature; however, they can eat segments of the player's creature to regrow their own. These creatures release many cells upon death, which can restore the health of the player's creature, temporarily increase the size of its mouth, or cause it to sprout decorative protrusions. Players are not required to eat these or any other organisms; they may travel to higher or lower planes at any time. Being defeated by aggressive creatures does not result in death, but causes the player's creature to float to a higher plane. In the Flash version, the player can replay the game with a jellyfish-like organism by defeating an aggressive creature on the bottom plane. If the player reaches the bottom again, the creature there is their original worm-like creature, and defeating it starts the game over as that organism.

=== PlayStation versions ===
The PlayStation 3 version of Flow features enhanced visuals and three additional playable organisms: one that can move with a short burst of speed, one that can paralyze other creatures, and one that lunges toward its prey's weak point. The worm creature from the original game was given the ability to move faster, while the jellyfish may now create a vortex to attract small creatures. These special moves are activated by hitting any button on the controller. When the player reaches the bottom plane with each creature, the next creature type is unlocked and becomes selectable at the beginning of the game. The PlayStation 3 version features a multiplayer mode for up to four players; a game in progress can be joined at any time, and players may play as different creatures. The PlayStation Portable version contains all the features introduced by the PlayStation 3 version, but reduces the size of each plane.

== Development ==
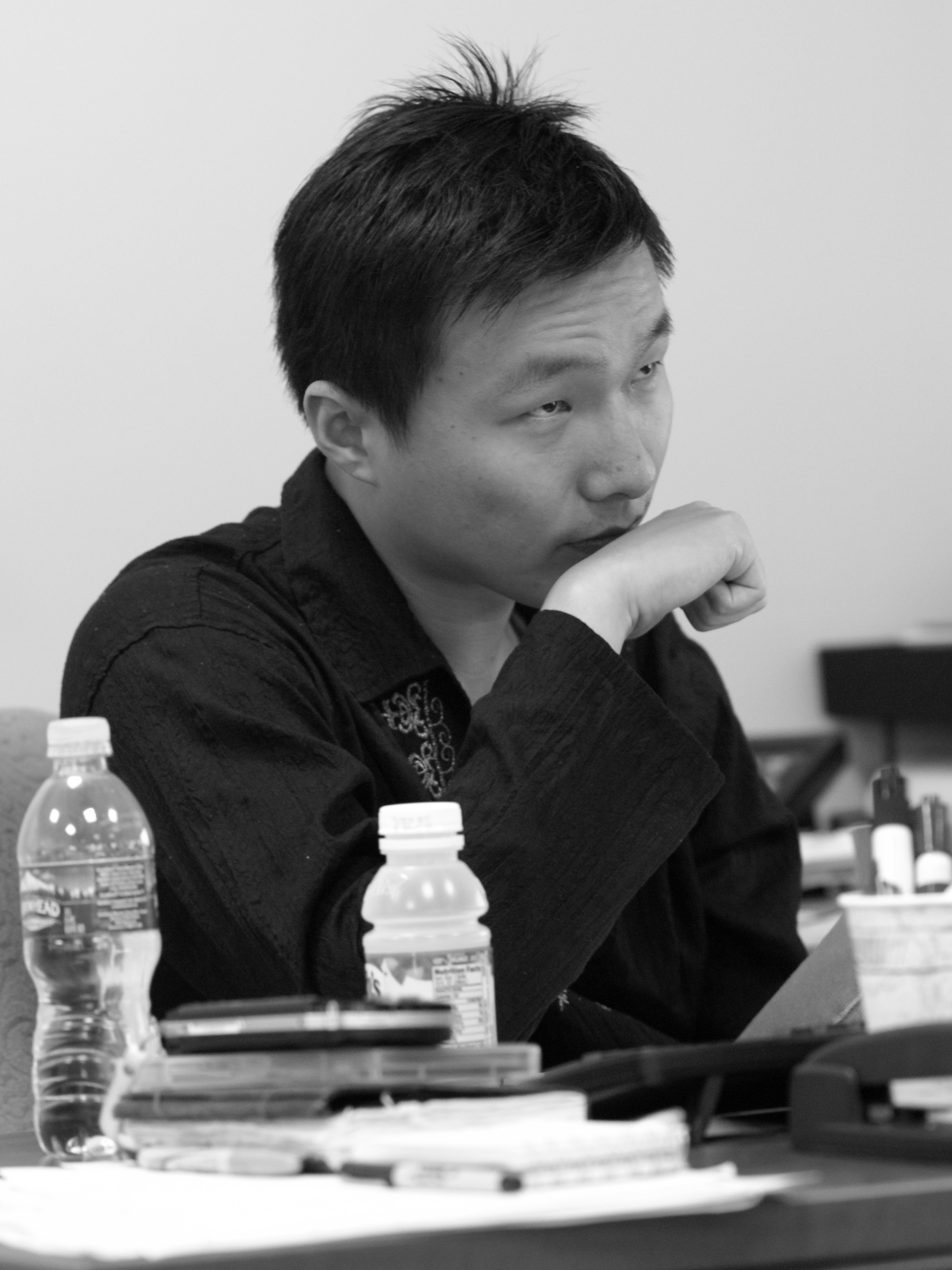
Designer Jenova Chen in 2007

Flow was originally developed as part of Jenova Chen's master's thesis for the Interactive Media Program at the University of Southern California's School of Cinematic Arts. His thesis was on the concept of dynamic difficulty adjustment (DDA), wherein a game adjusts its reactions to a player based on the past and present actions of that player. He illustrated his ideas with Flow, which he created in collaboration with Nicholas Clark. Chen implemented DDA by causing the player to change the game's difficulty subconsciously; he allowed players to dive between planes at will and provided the option of eating or not eating any creature. Players may decide to rush downwards or to grow stronger before attacking powerful opponents. Chen described Flow as "A simple game. It's the simplest test of active DDA." Another influence on the game was psychologist Mihaly Csikszentmihalyi's work on flow, wherein a person fully immerses themselves in an activity and gains a feeling of energized focus. To achieve this state, the person or player must have control over the activity; Chen believed that his DDA implementation gave players the control necessary to achieve flow while playing.

The game was released in March 2006 after two months of development, during which Chen and Clark taught themselves Flash programming. They chose Flash as the medium as they needed playtesters to tune the DDA algorithm but could not afford to pay them to download a game rather than entice people to play a game in their browser. They converted their budget of US$20 into World of Warcraft currency and paid players to fill out surveys after playing the game. The game's source code was later released in 2009. The game's score was composed by Austin Wintory, who had been doing music work for other student games at the school.

A PlayStation 3 version was announced for the PlayStation Store in May 2006, and was released in February 2007. Chen had graduated by that point, and had founded Thatgamecompany, which handled the conversion to the PlayStation 3; Nicholas Clark was one of the employees and served as the game version's designer. Impressed by Flow, and looking for games that could be marketed to adults for their upcoming PlayStation Network marketplace, Sony provided Thatgamecompany with finances, supplies, and additional staff, and offered them a three-game contract; the PlayStation 3 version of Flow was the first of these. Chen originally believed the conversion could be completed in four months and that it would be ready for the November 2006 launch of the PlayStation Network. However, when it was finally released in February 2007, it did not include "half of the original design". In November 2007 the PlayStation 3 version received an add-on pack that allows players joining a multiplayer game to select their creatures. The pack also includes new enemies, food types, and a playable creature with a shield ability.

A version for the PlayStation Portable, developed by SuperVillain Studios, was released in March 2008. The company coded it from scratch, as the PlayStation 3 version's code and art were too platform-specific to reuse. The add-on pack for the PlayStation 3 version was also developed by SuperVillain. Thatgamecompany was not involved in the development of either project beyond a design influence and art direction role, as they were creating their next title, Flower. SuperVillain Studios later created ports of the PlayStation 3 version for the PlayStation 4 and PlayStation Vita, which were published in November 2013 to correspond with the release of the PlayStation 4. Although no album of music specifically for Flow has been released, in 2012 Austin Wintory released Journey Bonus Bundle as a download-only album on Bandcamp, containing variations on themes from Flow and Journey, a 2012 PlayStation 3 game by Thatgamecompany.

== Reception ==
Reception

Aggregate scores
Aggregator	Score
GameRankings	PS3: 72%
Metacritic	PS3: 71/100; PSP: 70/100; PS4: 71/100

Review scores
Publication	Score
Eurogamer	7/10
GameSpot	PS3: 7.1/10; PSP: 7.0/10
IGN	7.6/10
PALGN	7/10

The Flash version of Flow received 100,000 downloads within its first two weeks of release. By July 2006, it had been downloaded over 650,000 times; by February 2008, it had been played over 3.5 million times. Its PlayStation 3 re-release was the most downloaded game on the PlayStation Network in 2007. Flow received the 2008 Game Developers Choice Awards nominations for the Innovation Award and Best Debut, and was presented with Best Downloadable Game. Flow was nominated for Downloadable Game of the Year at the AIAS' 11th Annual Interactive Achievement Awards, and for the Best Innovation award at the British Academy of Film and Television Arts's 4th British Academy Games Awards. Its music garnered nominations for Best Interactive Score and Most Innovative Use of Audio from the Game Audio Network Guild, and won composer Austin Wintory the Rookie of the Year award. Flow was a finalist at the 2007 Slamdance Guerrilla Games Competition, but withdrew along with several other finalists after Super Columbine Massacre RPG! was removed from the competition. In 2011 it was chosen through a public vote out of an initial selection of 240 to be one of 80 games showcased in a 2012 exhibit at the Smithsonian American Art Museum titled "The Art of Video Games". The game was also included in the 2010 video game reference book 1001 Video Games You Must Play Before You Die.

Flow received mixed reviews from critics, who focused on the game's PlayStation versions. The visuals and presentation were among its most praised elements, with IGN's Chris Roper calling them "one of Flow's greatest strengths". Alex Navarro of GameSpot agreed, saying that it was "hard to argue with those aesthetics"; he lauded the use of color, the designs of the creatures, and the dynamic soundtrack. Will Freeman of VideoGamer.com called it "attractive and stylish", which made the game "immensely satisfying to toy with". Richard Leadbetter of Eurogamer claimed that the game's main purpose was to "look pretty" and "sound cool".

Reviewers were mixed in their opinions on the gameplay; Roper said that "simply see[ing] what's next" was enjoyable, but acknowledged that the game's activities were limited beyond this aspect. Leadbetter went further, saying Flow "feels like a tech demo in many ways", and that its small amount of gameplay existed primarily "to act as a tour guide" through the visuals and audio. Freeman said that "it would not be unfair to describe Flow as empty and without substance." Navarro concluded that Flow was enjoyable for the few hours needed to complete it, but it lacked "a lasting gameplay experience"; he attributed this to the game's "heavy emphasis on aesthetics over gameplay". Luke Mitchell of PALGN, however, felt that "anything more complicated would take away from the friendly nature of an experience of this type."

Reviewers found the game to be largely unchallenging. Roper stated that "there really isn't any sort of a challenge here", particularly due to the player character's inability to die; Leadbetter summed up the game's difficulty as "negligible". However, when reviewing the PlayStation Portable version of the game, Justin Calvart of GameSpot took the view that "the game's difficulty masterfully scales to match your skill level", so it does not become overly "frantic or frustrating". Reviewers were universally dismissive of the multiplayer mode, with Calvart saying that "whatever it is, it's not good". Leadbetter called the PlayStation 3 version's multiplayer "little more than an afterthought", while Navarro said it "doesn't add a lick of depth to the experience".

Overall, reviewers saw Flow as being more akin to an art piece than a game. Navarro called it an "arty piece of gaming", and complimentarily said that it had the "vibe of an art-school project". Leadbetter believed that it was more of an experiment than a traditional game, and described it as a "trippy ornament". Freeman called it the PlayStation 3's "first art-house title". Roper summarized Flow as "not so much a game as it is an experience", and Mitchell claimed that it "tries to do something entirely unique and experimental, and on that level, it succeeds".
