= Craig Dietrich =

Digital artist

- Born: 15 June 1980
- Website: craigdietrich.com

Craig Dietrich is a digital artist and educator affiliated with Occidental College in Los Angeles.

== History ==
Dietrich began his multimedia career as an Exhibit Engineering Assistant at The Tech Museum of Innovation in San Jose, California. He attended Adrian C. Wilcox High School in Santa Clara, California. In 2008, he was a professor in the University of Maine New Media Department and continues as a researcher at UMaine's Still Water lab. Beginning in 2009, before moving to the Claremont Colleges, he was on the faculty of the Division of Media Arts and Practice, part of the School of Cinematic Arts, at the University of Southern California (USC), where he taught media studies and multimedia production. Dietrich often works with scholar and game designer Adam Sulzdorf-Liszkiewicz who was at USC at the same time.

== Software ==
Dietrich was the first lead developer of the Mukurtu Archive, a media content manager based on the Warumungu community Dillybag.

In 2005, he authored the Dynamic Backend Generator (DBG) with his team at the Vectors Journal of Culture and Technology in a Dynamic Vernacular. This MySQL database manager has been used by digital humanities projects including Public Secrets, Blue Velvet and Killer Entertainments.

Dietrich is the Info Design Director for the Alliance for Networking Visual Culture, which produces Scalar, an online publication platform principally designed with Creative Director Erik Loyer. Dietrich has publicly positioned Scalar's framework in opposition to prevalent web-based content managers such as WordPress.

== Personal life ==
Dietrich lives in Lincoln Heights, Los Angeles near Occidental College.
