= Steve F. Anderson =

American academic

- Born: 1963 (age 62–63)

Academic background
- Education: USC School of Cinematic Arts, California Institute of the Arts

Academic work
- Discipline: Digital Media
- Institutions: UCLA School of Theater, Film and Television
- Website: www.tft.ucla.edu/faculty/steve-anderson/

Steve F. Anderson is an American academic. He is a professor of digital media at the UCLA School of Theater, Film and Television. He was previously an associate professor in the USC Interactive Media & Games Division.

== Career ==
Anderson received his Master of Fine Arts in Film and Video from CalArts in 1990 and his Ph.D. in 2001 from the Film, Literature & Culture program at the University of Southern California under the direction of Professors David E. James, Marita Sturken, and Leo Braudy.

Anderson known for his contributions to the fields of digital humanities, scholarly electronic publishing, fair use advocacy and technocultural studies.

He served as founding director of the Ph.D. program in Media Arts and Practice at the USC School of Cinematic Arts. He co-edits the interdisciplinary electronic journal Vectors Journal of Culture and Technology in a Dynamic Vernacular and is the founder of Critical Commons, an online media archive and fair use advocacy network. He is author of the books Technologies of Vision: The War Between Data and Images (MIT 2018) and Technologies of History: Visual Media and the Eccentricity of the Past (Dartmouth 2011). With Christie Milliken he is co-editor of the anthology Reclaiming Popular Documentary (Indiana University Press 2021), which won the award for Best Edited Collection from the Popular Culture Association in 2022.

Technologies of History marks an intervention in the academic sub-field of Film and History, which has largely focused on the accuracy and verifiability of cinematic and televisual history, especially in the genres of documentary and historical epics. Anderson's book advocates consideration of the historiographical value of non-traditional (what he terms "eccentric") forms of visual history including experimental film and video, fake documentary, found footage, science fiction time travel and digital games. D. L. LeMahieu's book review in the journal Film & History notes that "Anderson's validation of the idiosyncratic and experimental opens new areas of research and analysis for historians."

In 2007, Anderson and Holly Willis won a HASTAC/MacArthur Foundation Digital Media and Learning grant to create CriticalCommons.org, public media archive.

In 2014-15 he received a prestigious Digital Innovation Fellowship from the American Council of Learned Societies (ACLS) to support his project "Technologies of Cinema: A Critical Digital Archive and Multimodal History of the American Technocultural Imaginary."
