= Jon Ippolito =

American artist

- Born: March 19, 1962 (age 63); Berkeley, California, U.S.
- Awards: Tiffany, Lannan, American Foundation, Carl & Marilynn Thoma Art Foundation
- Website: three.org/ippolito

Jon Ippolito (IPA: [ipˈpɔːlito], born March 19, 1962) is an American artist, educator, new media scholar, and former curator at the Solomon R. Guggenheim Museum. Ippolito studied astrophysics and painting in the early 1980s, then pursued Internet art in the 1990s. His works explore digitally induced collaboration and networking, a theme that is prominent in his later scholarship.

== History ==
After applying to what he thought was a position as a museum guard, Ippolito was hired in the curatorial department of the Guggenheim, where in 1993 he curated Virtual Reality: An Emerging Medium and subsequent exhibitions that explore the intersection of contemporary art and new media. In 2002 Ippolito joined the faculty of the University of Maine's New Media Department, where he co-founded Still Water with Joline Blais. His writing on the cultural and aesthetic implications of new media has appeared in The Washington Post, Art Journal, and numerous art magazines, including in a regular "Cross Talk" column for ArtByte magazine.

Ippolito also has an abiding interest in the legacy for today's artists of conceptual practices of the 1960s and 1970s. His contributions to this subject include curating events for the New York presentation of Rolywholyover A Circus for museum by John Cage. He is particularly interested in the parallel between digital art, Minimalist and Conceptual art, a parallel that led him to propose a new paradigm for preserving art called the Variable Media Network.

In 2015, Ippolito was the inaugural recipient of the Thoma Foundation Digital Arts Writing Award for an established arts writer who has made significant contributions to the intersection of art and technology.

== Projects ==
Often working collaboratively, Ippolito’s work traverses digital art, new media, and community building. He is a Professor of New Media at the University of Maine, where he teaches classes on programming, online culture, variable media, and viral media and directs the Digital Curation graduate program. With Joline Blais in 2002, he co-founded Still Water, a new media lab at the University of Maine at Orono devoted to studying and building creative networks.

In the 1990s, Ippolito worked with artists Janet Cohen and Keith Frank creating works that exposed the adversarial side of collaboration (Agree to Disagree and the Unreliable Archivist). During this time he also curated the Worlds of Nam June Paik and Virtual Reality: an Emerging Medium at the Guggenheim.

In the 2000s, Ippolito began working with collaborators John Bell and Craig Dietrich on digital tools. These projects include the distributed publication tool ThoughtMesh, a 2005 Vectors Journal of Culture and Technology in a Dynamic Vernacular commission that has grown to include conference proceedings, poetry, and full length books. ThoughtMesh is an unusual model for publishing and discovering scholarly papers online, which gives readers a tag-based navigation system that uses keywords to connect excerpts of essays published on different Web sites. Authors can choose to post an essay in a central repository hosted by the Vectors program at USC, the sponsor of this project, or to self-archive an essay on their own Web site. Stemming from research into variable media at the Guggenheim, the team is producing the Variable Media Questionnaire and the Metaserver, a lightweight metadata registry that automatically connects related data in separate repositories.

Ippolito and collaborators, including Bell, Blais, and Owen Smith, developed The Pool, an online project design workspace noted by the Chronicle of Higher Education as a "new avenue for new-media scholars to do their jobs." The Pool is a collaborative online environment for creating art, code, and texts. In place of the single-artist, single-artwork paradigm favored by the overwhelming majority of documentation systems, The Pool stimulates collaboration in a variety of forms, including multi-author, asynchronous, and cross-medium projects.

Additional projects include MARCEL, a permanent high band-width network for artistic experimentation, and the Maine Intellectual Commons Web site, helping to establish standards for creative and scholarly research that contribute to a culture of sharing.

== Publications ==
In 2014 Ippolito co-authored the book Re-collection: Art, New Media, and Social Memory with Richard Rinehart, which has been called "the first book dedicated to the subject of conserving new media art." The authors examine the preservation of new media art from both practical and theoretical perspectives, offering concrete examples that range from Nam June Paik to Danger Mouse. They investigate three threats to twenty-first century creativity: technology, because much new media art depends on rapidly changing software or hardware; institutions, which may rely on old-media preservation methods; and law, which complicates access with intellectual property constraints such as copyright and licensing. They point out that these three threats can also be enlisted as allies rather than enemies of ephemeral artifacts and their preservation. The variable media approach that Rinehart and Ippolito propose asks to what extent works to be preserved might be medium-independent, translatable into new mediums when their original formats are obsolete.

With Joline Blais, Ippolito produced the 2006 book At the Edge of Art. The book examines prominent new media artwork and artists, such as Alexander R. Galloway and jodi, arguing that the confines of the established art world are failing to recognize the home–grown and often ephemeral art found online. The book creates a metaphor between digital art and the human immune system, relating the auto-immune response to the important role of art in society.

In addition Ippolito has published over twenty book chapters and over forty print articles in a range of outlets such as The Washington Post, Artforum, and Leonardo. He has also given over 100 presentations at numerous academic and culture venues including the National Academies, NASA, and the American Assembly.

== Dialogues ==
- Interview of Jon Ippolito by Karen Verschooren
- "Artificial Life and Natural Death," discussion with Stewart Brand and Kevin Kelly, New Media and Social Memory, University of California, Berkeley, January 18, 2007
- "How to Hack Copyright for Fun and Profit," Open Source Culture Lecture Series, Columbia University, New York, December 2, 2004.
- "Creators and the Commons: Why and How To Share" at Conference on the Intellectual Commons, University of Maine, November 20, 2004.
- Interview by Dominico Quaranta, "Leaping into the abyss and resurfacing with a pearl," Noema (Ravenna, Italy) (November 2005).
- Interview by Liisa Ogburn, "What's Your Story: Jon Ippolito," Eatthesewords.com, October 2, 2001.
