= Critical Commons =

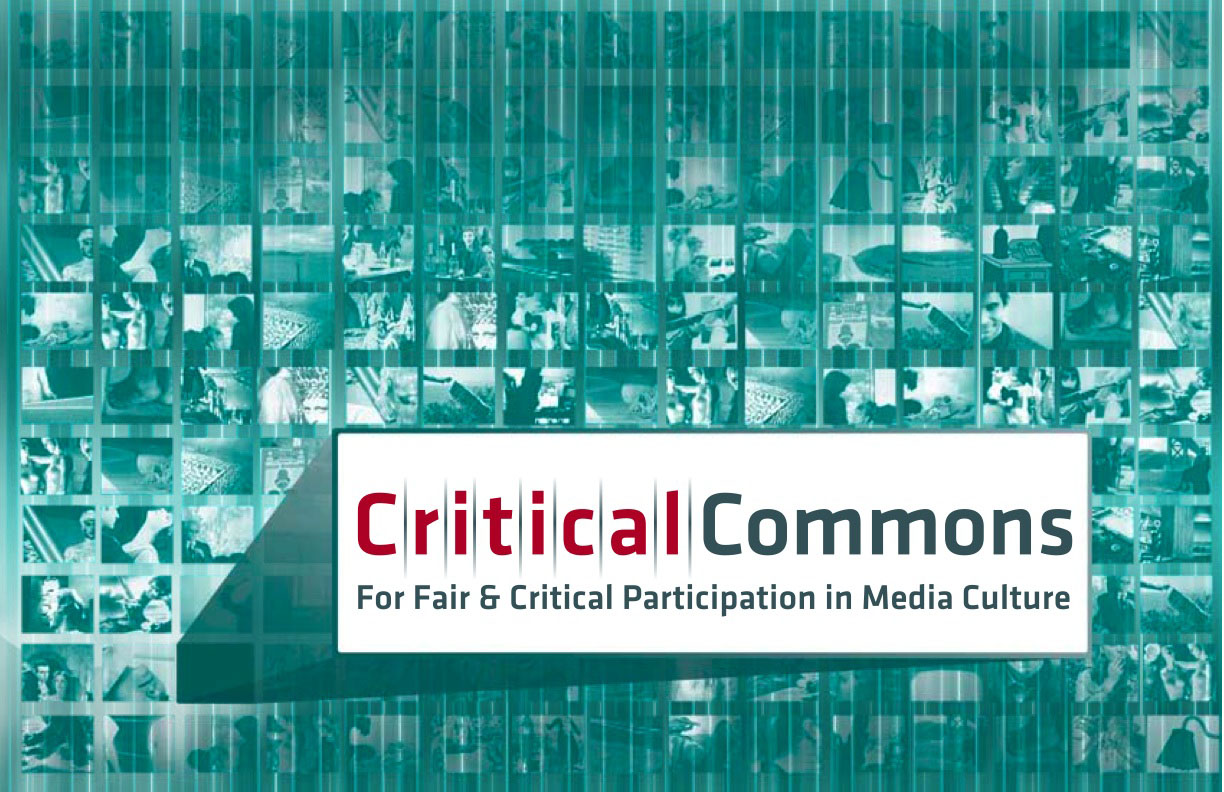
- Founder: Steve F. Anderson
- Designer: Erik Loyer
- Parent organization: USC School of Cinematic Arts
- Website: criticalcommons.org

Critical Commons is an online repository of user-generated media. The archive is a project of the Media Arts and Practice division of the USC School of Cinematic Arts. The project supports the fair use of copyrighted media by educators.

== History ==
Critical Commons was established in 2008 by Steve F. Anderson and is an ongoing project of the Media Arts and Practice division of the USC School of Cinematic Arts. Critical Commons was designed by Erik Loyer and developed using the free software video sharing system Plumi by the Asia-Pacific based EngageMedia and the Greece-based design collective Unweb.me. The site was launched with funding from the Macarthur Foundation's Digital Media and Learning Initiative and is part of an ongoing debate within higher education about the need for limitations and exceptions to copyright.

== Project background ==
Critical Commons makes use of the exemptions to the Digital Millennium Copyright Act (DMCA) that allow educators to circumvent the digital rights management of encrypted DVDs and downloads from online sources. Critical Commons utilizes the "safe harbor" provision of the DMCA granted to Internet service providers (ISPs) who have limited liability for potential copyright infringement by users.

Media in Critical Commons is contributed by users who must add transformative commentaries to their uploads in order for them to be viewable. Once a piece of media is publicly available, registered users can post additional commentaries or create lecture-style playlists of media that are placed within a critical context. The archive contains over 7500 media clips, still images and audio files accompanied by text commentaries. Media content posted on Critical Commons is widely embedded in electronic journals and media supplements for scholarly publication and classroom use.
