= Conservation and restoration of performance art =

Process to preserve performance art

The conservation and restoration of performance art is the process of documenting, collecting, and prolonging the life of Performance Art. Performance Art often features a live presentation initially documented by an artist, cultural institution, or host location. This genre of art can take place in a wide range of mediums, and is usually based on four core elements: Time, Space, the Performer's body, and the relationship between viewers and performer. These variables determine how it can be collected and conserved within museums or cultural institutions.

== History of performance art ==
Performance art activity is not confined to European or American art traditions; notable practitioners can be found in Asia and Latin America. Performance artists and theorists point to different traditions and histories, ranging from tribal to sporting and ritual or religious events. Twentieth century performance art originated from early avant-garde genres such as Futurism, Dada and Surrealism. The choreographed movements combined elements of traditional theater performances and styles of political rallies. The origins of the post-war performance art movement can be credited to composer John Cage and dancer Merce Cunningham at North Carolina's Black Mountain College. Cage's teaching in New York shaped the work of artists such as George Brecht, Yoko Ono, and Allan Kaprow, who formed part of the impetus behind the Fluxus movement and the creation of "happenings", which were then preceded by Abstract expressionism and Action painting. Since the 1960s the List of performance artists has continued to increase, and the styles of the genre are never confined.

== Artistic intent ==
In experiencing painting, film, literature, theatre, dance, music, and other arts, is it useful to consider the artist's intent, including evidence from previous work, external statements, and historical and personal contexts. Art and nature, non-aesthetic intent, the artist's testimony, historical context, situational approaches, intent for audiences, and textual intent are factors that take part in what or how the artist allows their work to be represented. The Artist's statement is another form in determining the conditions of their performance. These preferences include how the work can be documented, collected, and preserved.

== Ethical concerns ==
Performance art is often undefined in its boundaries, so this may raise concern for where and how it is exhibited. Additional concerns are raised in participatory performances. There are several Codes of Ethics for professionals working in conservation and preservation-related fields. In the United States, the main conservation Code of Ethics is the American Institute for Conservation of Historic and Artistic Works (AIC) Code of Ethics and Guidelines for Practice. However, many of the professional organizations have their own codes, such as the Society of American Archivists Core Values Statement and Code of Ethics.

== Conserving performance ==
Performance art contains a history of disregarding a standard definition or description, which presents a series of questions and discussions to qualify its conservation. Conserving and preserving Performance art was originally questioned if it was possible and for what reasons should it be collected. Projects such as the Variable Media Network and Collecting the Performative legitimized the field.

With input from artists, art educators and historians, conservators, and curators, a wider perspective is being generated for cultural institutions to develop new techniques in conserving and restoring live, time based works through workshops like The International Symposium "Collecting and Conserving Performance Art", held in Wolfsburg, Germany.

Several discussions have been published about the conservation of performance art. Already in 2018, references included: Pip Laurenson's and Vivian van Saaze's text on collecting performance art; the Issue on Performing Documentation in the Conservation of Contemporary Art, chapters in Authenticity in Transition: Changing Practices in Art Making and Conservation; articles in the Studies in Conservation special issue dedicated to the IIC LA Congress on Modern Art; contributions in ICOM-CC Triennial meetings; articles in the Journal of the Institute of Conservation; VDR-Journal "Beiträge zum Erhalt von Kunst- und Kulturgut" (Volume 2/2017 and 1/2018).

A broad discussion of what context the live works could be preserved has also been presented by David Smith of Asia Art Archive and Athena Christa Holbrook from Museum of Modern Art. These authors discuss the legitimacy of how a performance can be conserved and the resulting value of the work after by the artist, collection, and for the public. Recently, the project Documentation and Conservation of Performance, led by Tate, produced tools, workflows and critical perspectives. The project Reshaping the Collectible: When Artworks Live in the Museum, also led by Tate, also looked into the conservation of performance.

=== Cultural institutions ===
Cultural institutions like Museum of Modern Art and Tate Modern have developed conservation techniques on media-specific preservation needs, like securing equipment, updating exhibition-mode technology, and developing ways to re-create duration-based presentations. Their lists and policies establish a consistent method of collecting and preserving Performance Art by examining the license to "re-perform" the work, existing practices used to bring live works into a collection, and looking at past participants and producers.

Literature includes: Giguère's PhD, Alessandra Barbuto's (MAXXI) looks at the role of the museum in the preservation of performance art (see Performing Documentation), and Irene Müller discusses conservation and the relationship with archives. Glenn Wharton refers to the acquisition of VALIE EXPORT’s Abstract Film No. 1 by the Museum of Modern Art.

The book Histories of performance documentation (ed. by Gabriella Giannachi and Jonah Westerman) includes contributions from museum practitioners.

=== The artist ===
The artists/creators of the performance are the original source for the intentions for conserving the work. The artist's intent can determine how or to what degree the live work can be preserved. Popular performance artist Marina Abramović has spent much of her career recreating new versions of past performances by either replicating the physical actions or by selecting a reoccurring location, theme, or medium. She has also spent time as an educator in Performance Art so that her similar methods and styles are repeated. Marina has used several resources in copyrighting her work to ensure its authenticity and the work can be preserved in its current state. Performance scripts have also been used to preserve a live performance. With these written instructions or steps, the original live work can be re-performed or accurately represented keeping the artist's intentions true to the original work. Although curators and art critics have questioned if these scripts are sufficient materials for preserving and collecting the work; this method can be argued with similar conservation methods used in theater and performing arts.

== Conservation and restoration treatment methods ==
Performance art that includes video, film, slide, audio, or computer technologies often falls under the conservation and restoration of time-based media art because they have duration as a dimension and unfold to the viewer over time. Collecting, preserving, and exhibiting these performances raises complex technical and ethical challenges to conservators. Reside from Performance art fall under two main categories for either physical objects, and digital objects or New media associated with the work. While performances can have either category or combination to document the performance, exhibit, and preserve the existence or transformation of the work; the digital component has become the dominant method of prolonging the existence of the performance. Some strategies of overcoming the challenges of collecting live work are addressed in Marta Rodriguez's analysis.

=== Mediums ===
Performance art can take the form of several mediums with the possibility for combination such as but not limited to:

- BioArt
- Cyberformance
- Digital art
- Digital poetry
- Electronic art
- Evolutionary art
- Generative art
- Information art
- Interactive art
- Internet art
- Kinetic art
- Light art
- Motion graphics
- Net art
- Photography
- Sound art
- Video art
- Virtual art

These mediums can be the result of documentation for the performance or be directly involved in the art itself. The mediums often determine how the work is collected, conserved, and restored.

=== Physical objects ===
Physical props, tools, clothing, etc. remaining or created as a result of the performance can be a common representation to document and preserve the Performance. Collections care guides and policies manage best practices for prolonging the life of the work.

==== Preventive care and maintenance ====
Many works are sensitive to environmental conditions such as temperature, humidity and exposure to visible light and ultraviolet radiation. These works must be protected in controlled environments where such variables are maintained within a range of damage-limiting levels. Other causes of deterioration include:

- Pollution
- Poor Storage
- Poor Handling and Use

Collections care is an essential element of museum policy. It is a "responsibility of members of the museum profession to create and maintain a protective environment for the collections in their care, whether in store, on display, or in transit. Cultural institutions should carefully monitor the condition of collections to determine when an artifact requires conservation work and the services of a qualified conservator."

=== Digital ===
Digital mediums can be used for documentation or be a result of a performance such as digital photography, video, and audio files. Conservation and restoration of new media art can establish best practices for individuals, artists, and cultural institutions to prolong the life of the work.

==== Digital preservation ====
Works of new media art such as film, tapes, web browsers, software operating systems eventually become obsolete, and New Media art faces serious issues around the challenge to preserve artwork beyond the time of its contemporary production. The digital archiving of media (see the Rhizome ArtBase, and the Internet Archive), and the use of emulators to prolong the life of work that depend on obsolete software or operating systems.

==== Preventive care and maintenance ====
Instability and change are inherent to these artworks, since artist-selected equipment and technologies fail and become obsolete. Many time-based media artworks are ephemeral by nature; rather than being composed of a unique original, they exist only when they are installed, so every iteration can be considered a different representation of the artwork. To preserve the fragile identity of time-based media artworks, conservators must proactively manage the degree of change that may be introduced to each.

==== Methods of preservation ====
The Variable Media Questionnaire (VMS) has developed into a significant tool in relation to digital preservation.

- Refreshing – The periodic transfer of an audiovisual or digital file from one cassette or disk to another device of identical format.
- Restoration – The cleaning or repair of an existing artifact or file, especially when the new version supersedes or replaces the original.
- Networked storage – The use of computers linked by a persistent data loop to keep critical files in circulation or as multiple copies cloned on multiple hard drives.
- Migration – To upgrade its format from an aged medium to a more current one, such as from VHS to DVD, accepting that some changes in quality may occur while still maintaining the integrity of the original. This strategy assumes that preserving the content or information of an artwork, despite its change in media, trumps concerns over fidelity to the original look and feel.

==== Acquisition and storage ====
Physical media-equipment, such as DVD players or computers, used in multi-media or digital artworks has proven a short-term strategy, as hardware can quickly become obsolete or outdated. Storage is also notoriously bad at capturing the contextual and live aspects of works such as Internet art, performance art and live electronic music.

==== Causes of deterioration ====
For the residue and documentation of performance art, new media preservationists work to integrate new preservation strategies with existing documentation techniques and metadata standards. This effort is made in order to remain compatible with previous frameworks and models on how to archive, store and maintain variable media objects in a standardized repository utilizing a systematized vocabulary, such as the Open Archival Information System model.

The practice of digital preservation and web archiving offers special challenges and opportunities. Where scientific data and legal records may be easily migrated from one platform to another without losing their essential function, artworks are often sensitive to the look and feel of the media in which they are embedded. On the other hand, artists who are invited to help imagine a long-term plan for their work often respond with creative solutions. Emulation and Reinterpretation are additional approaches for prolonging the life of digital objects and documentation.

=== Pest management ===
For physical objects and props relating to a performance piece, conservators must follow proper pest management standards. Integrated Pest Management policies are created to reduce or limit any problems relating to pests damaging objects within collections. Policies and checklists specific to museum integrated pest management, for example from the National Park Service and Smithsonian Institution, discuss best practices, to include restricting food and sugary drink consumption in exhibition and storage areas and surrounding areas along with maintaining cleanliness in exhibition and storage areas.
