= John P. Bell =

American design professor

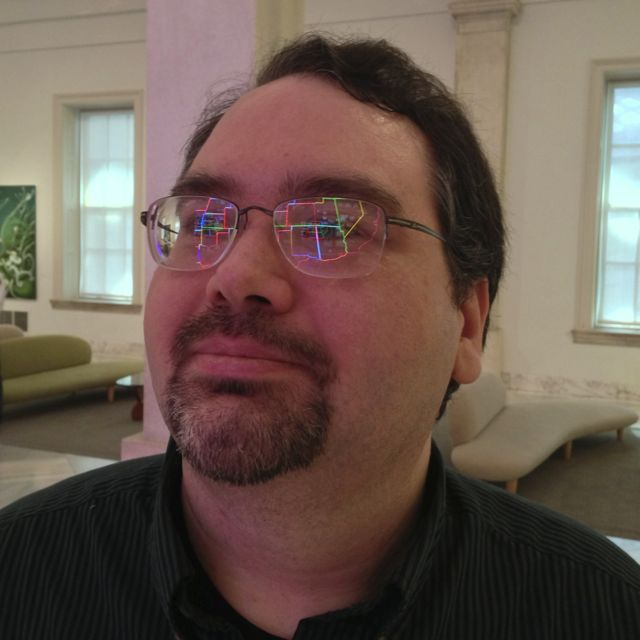
- Bell at the National Gallery of Art in Washington, D.C., May 2013
- Born: 1 June 1979 (age 46); Orono, Maine, U.S.
- Website: www.johnpbell.com

John P. Bell (born June 1, 1979) is an American digital artist, educator, and software developer at Dartmouth College and the University of Maine whose work centers on creative collaboration and digital culture.

== History ==
Bell began developing software to support digital humanities and art at the University of Maine's Still Water lab in 2003. He joined the teaching faculty of University of Maine's New Media department in 2008.

In 2011 he became one of the founding faculty of the University of Maine's Innovative Communication Design and Digital Curation programs. Simultaneously, Bell and his collaborators Richard R. Corey and Bethany Engstrom proposed an unusual doctoral program where the three would work together on a shared research project and collective dissertation studying collaboration in the arts. The three were awarded interdisciplinary PhDs from the University of Maine in 2014 based on this work, and the pattern of critically studying collaborative methods by applying them would become prominent in Bell's later work.

== Software ==
Bell has argued that the principles and methods used in the development of Open-Source Software can be applied to other areas of creative production. He applied this theory in the production of The Pool, an online project design workspace conceived of by Jon Ippolito, Owen Smith, Joline Blais, Mike Scott, and others that was described by the Chronicle of Higher Education as a "new avenue for new-media scholars to do their jobs."

Bell expanded on the relationship between code and culture as a co-author of the book 10 PRINT CHR$(205.5+RND(1)); : GOTO 10, which examined how the titular one-line BASIC program could be read from interconnected technical, historical, and social contexts using methods from critical code studies. The book's publication renewed interest in the 10 PRINT program and prompted ports to other languages, coding tutorials, and generative artwork based on the simple pattern it creates. Despite not being explicitly about gaming, PC Gamer called 10 PRINT one of the best books about video games in 2016.

In 2007, Ippolito and Bell redesigned the Variable Media Questionnaire, a tool that encapsulates the variable media paradigm for preservation of art pioneered by Ippolito in the 1990s. Bell designed the third generation of the tool, again applying software design principles to art by re-envisioning the variable media paradigm to treat an artwork as a system of modular components with defined interactions and parameters that was inspired by object oriented programming patterns.
