= Blue Velvet =

Blue Velvet may refer to:

- "Blue Velvet" (song), a 1950 popular song made famous by Bobby Vinton
  - Blue Velvet, a 1963 album by Bobby Vinton originally released as Blue on Blue
- Blue Velvet (film), a 1986 film by David Lynch
  - Blue Velvet (soundtrack), a soundtrack by Angelo Badalamenti for the 1986 film
- Blue Velvet (The Clovers album), a 1946 album by The Clovers
- Blue Velvet, a 1988 album by Sue Ann Carwell
- Blue Velvet (Houston Person album), a 2001 album by Houston Person
- "Blue Velvet" (Shizuka Kudō song), a 1997 song by Shizuka Kudō
- Blue Velvet, a Japanese musical duo featuring Ayana and Shūichi Aoki
- Blue Velvet (digital project), an online history project about New Orleans and Hurricane Katrina
- Blue Velvet, a mixture of morphine and tripelennamine
- "Blue Velvet", a song by Australian metal band Thornhill

== See also ==
- Creedence Clearwater Revival, originally known as The Blue Velvets
- Paraglyphidodon oxyodon, commonly known as the Blue Velvet Damselfish
- Terana caerulea, commonly known as the Velvet Blue Spread
