= Joline Blais =

American educator

Joline J. Blais
- Born: May 9, 1960; Lewiston, Maine, U.S.
- Education: A.B. Harvard 1982; PhD University of Pennsylvania 1991
- Occupation: educator
- Known for: scholarship at intersection of digital culture, indigenous culture, and permaculture

Joline Blais (born May 9, 1960) is an American writer, educator, new media scholar, and permaculture designer.

As Associate Professor in the University of Maine's New Media Department, Blais teaches classes on digital narrative, sustainable design, and permaculture. With Jon Ippolito in 2002, she co-founded Still Water, a new media lab she continues to co-direct that is devoted to studying and building creative networks. Blais' publications and creative work explore the overlap of digital culture, indigenous culture, and permaculture which has included advocacy for updated tenure and promotion criteria based on sharing rather than hierarchical principles.

== Selected Projects ==
Blais' 2006 book At the Edge of Art, co-authored with Ippolito and published by Thames & Hudson, investigates how new media art puts the power of networks and distributed creativity into the hands of ordinary citizens in a variety of non-art contexts. The book creates a metaphor between digital art and the human immune system, relating the auto-immune response to the important role of art in society. In this book Blais coins the terms "autobotography," personal histories automatically recorded by digital devices such as webcams and blogs, and "executability," an ability of 21st-century expression to operate on computable, social, or legal codes.

Blais and collaborators, including John Bell, Ippolito, and Owen Smith, developed The Pool, an online project design workspace noted by the Chronicle of Higher Education as a "new avenue for new-media scholars to do their jobs." The Pool is a collaborative online environment for creating art, code, and texts. In place of the single-artist, single-artwork paradigm favored by the overwhelming majority of documentation systems, The Pool stimulates collaboration in a variety of forms, including multi-author, asynchronous, and cross-medium projects.

In 2005 Blais partnered with New York's Eyebeam Art and Technology Center to conceive and produce an online forum on open culture that spanned six weeks and four continents. Entitled Distributed creativity, this system wove together correspondents from separate email lists based in California (Creative Commons), New York (Rhizome), Ireland (DATA), India (Sarai), and Australia (Fibreculture) in a global conversation on the future of creativity, intellectual property, and mobile media.

Her sustainability projects include LongGreenHouse (2007–2011), which wove the Wabanaki Longhouse, permaculture gardens, and networked collaboration in a hybrid "communiversity," in partnership with UMaine, the Wassookeag school, and Wabanaki elders. Other projects include RFC: Request for Ceremony, a call for re-investing quotidian life with ceremony; and the Cross-Cultural Partnership, a legal framework for developing trust networks with indigenous peoples.

In 2008 Blais expanded this work from the university to community contexts as a partner and equity member of Belfast Cohousing & Ecovillage, whose net zero prototype house was the US Green Building Council's 2011 Project of the Year.

== Selected publications ==
Joline Blais and Jon Ippolito, "Art As Antibody: A Redefinition of Art for the Internet Age," Intelligent Agent 6, no. 2 (Summer 2006), mirrored at http://www.intelligentagent.com/archive/ia6_2_transvergence_blaisippolito_artasantibody.pdf.

Joline Blais and Jon Ippolito, At the Edge of Art (London: Thames & Hudson, 2006).

Joline Blais, Indigenous Domain: Pilgrims, Permaculture, and Perl

Joline Blais, Jon Ippolito, Steve Evans, Owen Smith, and Nate Stormer, "New Criteria for New Media," Leonardo (MIT Press) 42, no. 1 (Spring 2009).

Joline Blais and Jon Ippolito, "New Media Innovators," in Lucas Dietrich, ed., 60: Innovators Shaping Our Creative Future (London: Thames & Hudson, 2010).

Joline Blais, Jon Ippolito, Lawrence Lessig, and Carrie McLaren, "Share/Share Alike," Intelligent Agent (New York and Baton Rouge) 4.2 (June 2004), http://www.intelligentagent.com.
