= Barbara Daly =

American author of romance novels

- Born: November 13, 1939 (age 86)
- Occupation: Novelist
- Writing career
- Genre: Romance
- Notable work: A Long Hot Christmas
- Notable awards: RITA award – Short Contemporary Romance; 2002 A Long Hot Christmas

Barbara Daly (born November 13, 1939) is an American author of romance novels. She won a Romance Writers of America's RITA Award for her novel A Long Hot Christmas.

== Bibliography ==
=== Novels ===
- Three for the Road (1999)
- Home Improvement (1999)
- A Long Hot Christmas (2001)
- Too Hot to Handle (2002)
- Mistletoe Over Manhattan (2003)
- When the Lights Go Out... (2004)
- Kiss and Run (2005)

=== Omnibus ===
- Great Genes! / Make Me Over (1999) (with Meg Lacy)
- The Wrong Mr Right / Never Say Never! (2000) (with Tina Wainscott)
- You Call This Romance? / Are You for Real? (2002)
- Mistletoe Over Manhattan / A Sure Thing (2003) (with Jacquie D'Alessandro)
- When the Lights Go Out / Her Private Dancer (2004) (with Cami Dalton)
- To the Max / Kiss and Run (2005) (with Darlene Gardner)
- Dare / Kiss and Run (2006) (with Cara Summers)

== Awards and reception ==
- 2002 - Romance Writers of America RITA Award, Short Contemporary Romance – A Long Hot Christmas

Daly has also been twice nominated by Romantic Times for Reviewers' Choice Awards, for A Long Hot Christmas and Too Hot to Handle. Romantic Times described her Harlequin Duets novel Are You For Real as "fast-paced, fresh and funny".
