= Anne Friedberg =

- Born: August 29, 1952; Urbana, Illinois, U.S.
- Died: October 9, 2009 (aged 57); Los Angeles, California U.S.
- Occupations: Author, historian, Media Theorist
- Years active: Late 20th – early 21st century
- Board member of: President-elect of the Society for Cinema and Media Studies
- Awards: Academy Scholar (Academy of Motion Picture Arts and Sciences, 2009)

Academic background
- Education: NYU

Academic work
- Discipline: Cinema Studies, Media Studies, Visual Culture
- Sub-discipline: Film and media histories and theories, old media/new media historiographies, Critical theory/feminist theory, Nineteenth century visual culture, Architecture and film.
- Institutions: UC Irvine; University of Southern California** (USC)

Anne Friedberg (August 29, 1952 – October 9, 2009) was an American author, historian and theorist of modern media culture, chair of the Critical Studies Division in the School of Cinematic Arts at the University of Southern California and President-elect of the Society for Cinema and Media Studies.

Friedberg was born in Urbana, Illinois, on August 29, 1952. In 2003, she joined the USC faculty, where she was instrumental in the creation of the Visual Studies Graduate Certificate and the Media Arts and Practice Ph.D. program. In 2009, she was named an Academy Scholar by the Academy of Motion Picture Arts and Sciences. She died in Los Angeles on October 9, 2009, at the age of 57.

== Academic career ==
Friedberg received her PhD in cinema studies from NYU. She was on the faculty of Film and Media Studies at UC Irvine, where she was the principal architect for a new interdisciplinary Ph.D. program in Visual Studies and the founding director and programmer of UCI's Film and Video Center.

Friedberg lectured widely in the United States and elsewhere, including invited talks in Berlin, Frankfurt, Bonn, Vienna, Tokyo, Montreal, Bern, Lausanne, Stockholm, Prague, and at the Guggenheim Museum/NY, Art Institute/Chicago, and Getty Museum/LA. In 2001–2002, she was a visiting scholar at the Getty Research Institute. During 2005–2006, she was a fellow at USC's Annenberg Center as a member of the Networked Publics research group.

Friedberg's research and teaching interests included: film and media histories and theories, old media/new media historiographies, critical theory/ feminist theory, nineteenth century visual culture and early cinema, theories of vision and visuality, architecture and film, global media culture.

Her most important scholarly and theoretical work is generally considered to be the recent The Virtual Window: From Alberti to Microsoft, which synthesized her previous writing about movies, film, and television, and her long experience as a theorizer of forms of visual experience. Therein, she subjected the common linguistic tropes of visual representation, including "window," "screen", and "the virtual" to rigorous analysis, analysis that in many cases rendered commonly accepted definitions inadequate. Drawing on philosophical and theoretical texts ranging from the art historian Erwin Panofsky to poststructuralists like Derrida, Friedberg proposed that forms of static-image, moving-image, and computer-modeled representation represented significantly different systems susceptible to rigorous analysis.

Several of Friedberg's proposals lay at the center of a larger movement to more precisely and sustainedly interrogate and integrate philosophical, "theoretical" (notably post-structural and French), and art-historical investigations of the nature of human representations and their roots in historical and cultural contexts. Among the most notable of these were distinctions between human sight and photographic representation, proposals on the nature of Durer's "veil," and an argument that Alberti's treatise was misinterpreted due to a failure to read the original Latin. The publication of her book was accompanied by an interactive online companion, The Virtual Window Interactive, created in collaboration with designer Erik Loyer.

== Publications ==
- The Virtual Window: From Alberti to Microsoft, by Anne Friedberg (The MIT Press, 2006)
- 'The Virtual Window Interactive @ http://thevirtualwindow.net/
- “Televisual Space”: Special Issue of Journal of Visual Culture, co-edited by Anne Friedberg and Raiford Guins (2004)
- Close-Up 1927-1933: Cinema and Modernism, co-edited by Anne Friedberg, James Donald and Laura Marcus (Princeton University Press, 1998)
- Window Shopping: Cinema and the Postmodern, by Anne Friedberg (University of California Press, 1993)
- "Les Flaneurs de Mal(l): Cinema and the Postmodern Condition," by Anne Friedberg (PMLA, Journal of the Modern Language Association, 1991)

== Honors ==
- Faculty Fellow, Annenberg Center, USC 2005-2006
- Visiting Scholar, Getty Research Institute, 2001-2002
- UCI Humanities Center Faculty Research Grant, 2000, 1998, 1995
- UCI Celebration of Teaching Award in the Humanities, 1997
- UCI Humanities Associates Teaching Award 1992
- NEH Travel Award, 1991
- ARTSPACE New Writing in Arts Criticism Award, 1988
- NEH Fellow, Summer Institute, Harvard, 1987
