= Karol Martesko-Fenster =

American media executive

Karol Martesko-Fenster is an American media executive.

== Career ==
Martesko-Fenster is the founder and chief content officer of Thought Engine Partners and the chief operating officer of specialized theatrical film distributor and global rights management enterprise Abramorama. His past work includes a stint at Babel Networks providing strategic consulting services to film and media ventures. As the executive vice president of Babel Networks US, Martesko-Fenster led the film and animation division for Babelgum, the global web, mobile and IPTV destination. Previously, Martesko-Fenster was head of the Film Division at Chris Blackwell's Palm Pictures Entertainment Properties and President of Palm's RES Media Group. During his five-year tenure he supervised the strategic re-organization of the film division and oversaw the company's successful theatrical releases of Scratch and Sex and Lucia. While at Palm, he led all operations and brand positioning for the RES Media Group business unit, including its digital film festival RESFest.

Prior to joining Palm, Martesko-Fenster was the president of Rising Tide Studios, an integrated media and convergence company founded by Jason Calacanis. As president and publisher, Martesko-Fenster supervised the growth and development of the Silicon Alley Reporter and Digital Coast Reporter magazines.

In the mid 1990s, Martesko-Fenster co-founded and launched Filmmaker, IndieWire, RES (magazine), and The Virtual FilmFestival. Martesko-Fenster was the market director for the 1989 Independent Feature Film Market, the inaugural event at the Angelika Film Center. In 1990, as the acting executive director of the Independent Feature Project, Martesko-Fenster restructured the film service organization and co-initiated the inaugural Gotham Awards.

In the late 1980s, Martesko-Fenster was a coordinating producer for Great Performances Music on PBS and produced over 20 music television programs and five live satellite broadcasts, including; Gala of Stars, James Levine's Mozart in Salzburg, Celebrating Gershwin: S’Wonderful & The Jazz Age, Herbert von Karajan's Don Giovanni, Hal Prince's Madama Butterfly, Pavarotti Returns to Naples and From Vienna: The New Year's Celebration with Walter Cronkite.

Martesko-Fenster produced the Webby Award-winning program, WE THE ECONOMY 20 Short Films You Can't Afford To Miss (’15), FOCUS FORWARD - Short Films, Big Ideas (’13), Rage (’10), epitonic.com (’03), indiewire.com (’03 & ’01), and sputnik7.com (’01).

He received a B.A. from SUNY Purchase and an M.F.A. from Columbia University with a concentration in entertainment law, theater management and film production.

== Recent ==
Martesko-Fenster is the Chief Operating Officer of Abramorama operating out of New York and Los Angeles. Martesko-Fenster is primarily responsible for corporate organization and management and global strategic partnerships, and he participates in all acquisition and distribution activities. Prior to becoming a partner at Abramorama, Martesko-Fenster was President of Film & Media for Michael Cohl's S2BN Entertainment responsible for all of the film and media interests. He co-founded and launched conditionone, known for its advanced VR technology and immersive films, with war photographer and filmmaker Danfung Dennis.

== Films ==
Martesko-Fenster has produced several documentary and feature films. He is credited as a producer on Benjamin Jonathan Bergmann'as Gelato and Mau and Thomas Wirthensohn’s upcoming Mystic Business and Homme Less (2014 DOC NYC Grand Jury Award Winner), and Maura Axelrod’s Maurizio Cattelan – Be Right Back. He is credited as an Executive Producer on Daniel McCabe’s This Is Congo, Leslie Iwerks’ Ella Brennan: Commanding The Table, Amy Benson's Drawing The Tiger, Phil Cox's The Love Hotel and The Bengali Detective (2013 Grierson Documentary Award, 2011 Sundance and Berlin Film Festival competition selection), Noel Dernesch & Moritz Springer's Journey To Jah (2013 Zurich Film Festival Audience Award Winner), Havana Marking's Smash & Grab: The Story of the Pink Panthers (’13), and Danfung Dennis’ Hell And Back Again (2013 EMMY Best Documentary Award nominee, 2013 Grierson Documentary Award, 2011 Sundance World Documentary Grand Jury and Cinematography Award Winner, and 2012 ACADEMY AWARD Best Documentary nominee).

He is also credited as an Executive Producer on Floored (Documentary Film), Dark Fibre and Wetlands Preserved and collaborated with Richard Linklater on Before Sunrise. He was a special consultant on Kevin Kerslake's As I Am: The Life and Times of DJ AM, and past projects include Frank Dead Souls, Scenes From The New World, Myth or Reality: The von Trapp Family and Vienna 1900.
