= William McMullen =

William or Bill(y) McMullen may refer to:

- William McMullen (politician) (1888–1982), Irish trade unionist and politician
- Bill McMullen, American designer who created logo for mid-1990s Flux Television
- Rodney McMullen (William Rodney McMullen, born 1960/1961), American business executive, CEO of Kroger
- Billy McMullen (born 1980), American football player
