= NYSM =

NYSM may refer to:

- New York State Museum, a public museum located in Albany, New York, US
- Now You See Me (disambiguation), a title given to various stories, songs, films, and other artworks
