= Blue Velvet (digital project) =

Blue Velvet is an online digital history project about the city of New Orleans both before and after Hurricane Katrina. The project was published in the fifth issue of Vectors Journal of Culture and Technology in a Dynamic Vernacular, entitled "Difference." The full title is Blue Velvet: Re-dressing New Orleans in Katrina's Wake.

== Creation and design ==
Blue Velvet was created through the collaboration of David Theo Goldberg, director of the University of California Humanities Research Institute (UCHRI), and a graduate research assistant, Stefka Hristova. They were assisted in the implementation of the site by the digital artist and designer Erik Loyer, the creative director of the journal.

The project was conceived as a multimedia presentation of a journal article which Goldberg had previously published, "Deva-stating Disasters: Race in the Shadow(s) of New Orleans" and which had been noticed by Tara McPherson, one of the founding editors of Vectors. From the first meeting, the group became aware that "the writing had to be envisaged in a more creative and experimental form," both as a result of the kinds of material they planned to use and the architecture of the site.

The design of the site was the result of "intense weekly conversations over something like a year" and includes images, text, video, and sound files. The project is set to the composition "Apparition" by Liu Sola.

== Content ==
The content of the project is available through two different presentations. The first presentation, the main project, is an interactive, linear presentation of text organized in the form of 24 "arguments". The second presentation is an interactive index which allows the reader to navigate the text of the project independently. The project examines the effect of the hurricane on the city, and "underscores...that the tragic events that unfolded in New Orleans and along the Gulf Coast were possible precisely because of years of neoliberal policies that underwrote the necessary conditions for such devastation in the first place."

== Arguments and key phrases ==
The reader progresses through the project argument by argument by clicking on key phrases associated with each argument. This gives the reader access to the maps, images, graphs, videos and audio files as well as the text of each argument. The arguments and key phrases composing Blue Velvet are:

Argument	Key Phrase
New Orleans	Sociality
Preferences	Neo-conservatism
Liberty	Homogeneity
Activist Segregation	Segregation
Redlining	Redistrict
Conservationist Segregation	Race Neutrality
Racial Privacy/Privatizing Race	Born-again Racism
Catastrophe	Disaster Relief
Apparitions	Signs
Politics of Fear	Fear
Crisis Management	Vulnerability
Emergency	Immobility
Carcerality	Structural Racism
Exposure	Civility
Violence	Special Treatment
Skin	Condomization
Mis-recognition	Immigration
Surviving	Live free or die
Militarization	Redistribute
In-security	Security
In-Visibility	Pollution
Disenchantment	Privatization
Singing the Blues	Surgical
Re-Dress	Homogenized apartness

== See also ==
- Effects of Hurricane Katrina on New Orleans
