= Now You See It =

Now You See It may refer to:

- Now You See It (American game show), a 1974–1975 game show, resurrected in 1989
- Now You See It (Australian game show), a 1985–1999 children's game show
- Now You See It (British game show), a 1981–1995 British television game show
- "Now You See It" (Shake That Ass), a 2009 song by Honorebel
- Now You See It, an Oscar-nominated live-action short film by Pete Smith
- Now You See It, a novel by Stuart M. Kaminsky
- Now You See It (book), a 2011 book by Cathy Davidson
- Now You See It, a play by Georges Feydeau published as Le Système Ribadier
- Now You See It, a BBC magic and entertainment show, narrated by Mel Giedroyc
- Now You See It..., an alternate title for Second Foundation Part I: Search by the Mule (1948)
- Now You See It..., a 2005 Disney Channel Original Movie
- "Now You See It" (It: Welcome to Derry), an episode of It: Welcome to Derry

== See also ==
- Now You See It, Now You Don't (disambiguation)
- Now You See Me, Now You Don't (disambiguation)
- Now You See Me (disambiguation)
  - Now You See Me franchise, a film series involving magic and heists
    - Now You See Me (film), a 2013 American caper thriller film
    - Now You See Me 2, a 2016 film and sequel to the 2013 film Now You See Me
    - Now You See Me: Now You Don't, the 2025 sequel film
