= Killer Entertainments =

Killer Entertainments is a project by Jenny Terry and Raegan Kelly addressing the role of video in the Iraq War. It attempts to answer the question of how to present and analyze videos taken by soldiers, marines, and other combatants during battle without diminishing or sensationalizing their contributions. Terry and Kelly's resulting design uses the digital medium to allow nonlinear connections instead of a traditional, static narrative. They present multiple viewpoints without focusing on a single argument, letting users interpret the material for themselves.

== Support ==
Killer Entertainments utilizes the Vectors Journal of Culture and Technology in a Dynamic Vernacular space from the University of Southern California. The international online journal maintained by the University of Southern California's Institute for Multimedia Literacy within the School of Cinematic Arts explores the convergence of culture and technology. Vectors publishes projects that are best told through the multimedia tools of the digital sphere.

== Layout ==
The three-way split for viewing videos on the main page is representative of the variety of viewpoints available in a war zone. Once the user clicks on red and brown information points branching out from correlating screens the red spots darken slightly while the brown spots become hollow. After extensive exploration of the project the page takes on the sight of a battlefield, littered with red tracers, dried blood spots and bullet holes.

More importantly, these informational points provide significant contextual background, giving the user a greater ability to interpret the various videos. Points include location, people, military units, warfare terminology, cinematic vocabulary, and larger war questions. For example, cinematic vocabulary describes the effect of camera types and angles on the audience. Terry and Kelly differentiate among helmet-mounted, hand-held, video game proprioception, night vision, gun- and vehicle-mounted, direct address, and war documentaries.

== Sources ==
Beneath the individual screens are brief descriptions, production notes, where the videos were shot, when they were posted and links to the original websites where they were found. Videos were taken from a variety of websites ranging from the purely military to the insurgent-based. Within the micro-narratives Kelly cites articles, books, and various websites.
