= Cathy Davidson =

Ruth F. DeVarney Professor of English at Duke University

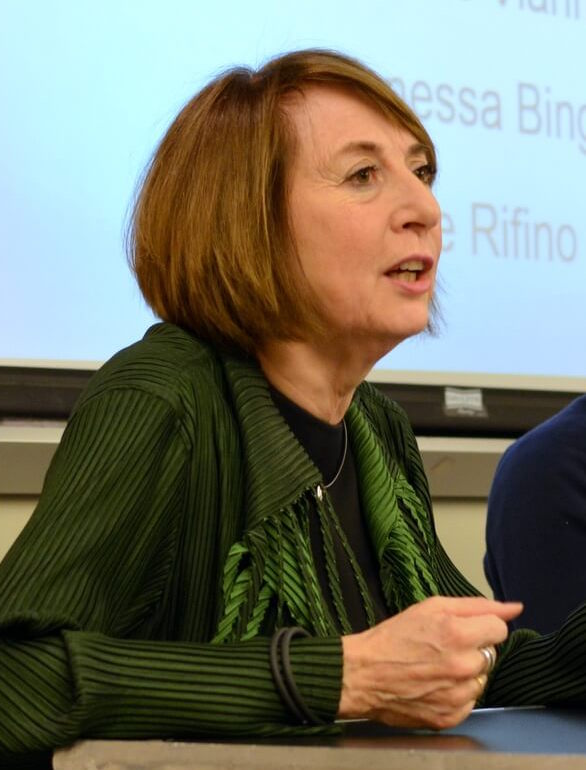
- Cathy Davidson in 2015
- Born: 1949 (age 76–77)
- Occupations: Professor, writer
- Title: Founding Director of the Futures Initiative
- Awards: Educator of the Year (2012); Ernest L. Boyer Award (2016)

Academic work
- Discipline: English
- Institutions: CUNY Graduate Center; Duke University
- Notable works: Now You See It
- Website: http://www.cathydavidson.com

Cathy N. Davidson (born 1949) is an American scholar and university professor. She is a Distinguished Professor of English, Digital Humanities, and Data Analysis and Visualization at the Graduate Center of the City University of New York where she founded the Futures Initiative.

She has authored or edited 18 books. Her work focuses on technology, collaboration, cognition, learning, and the digital age.

== Early life and education ==
Davidson was born in Chicago, received a B.A. from Elmhurst College, an M.A. and Ph.D. from the Binghamton University, and did postdoctoral studies at the University of Chicago. She has received honorary doctorates from Elmhurst College and Northwestern University.

== Career ==
Davidson was a professor of English at Michigan State University. She served as vice provost for Interdisciplinary Studies at Duke University from 1998 to 2006, with administrative responsibility for over 60 research programs in Duke's nine academic and professional schools. She was responsible for designing technologies for research, teaching, and learning, and in 1999 helped create ISIS, the program in Information Science + Information Studies at Duke.

In 2002, Davidson co-founded with David Theo Goldberg the virtual organization Humanities, Arts, Science, and Technology Advanced Collaboratory HASTAC, an international organization dedicated to rethinking the future of learning for the information age.

In 2003, Davidson initiated a program at Duke, in conjunction with Apple Computer, to give free iPods to each member of the incoming class with no other requirements. This sparked harsh criticism and ridicule from the academic community and news media. The program was viewed as a success by Duke since it led to new applications for the iPod in an educational environment and inspired a new initiative among Duke students to innovate and collaborate.

In 2010, President Obama nominated her to a six-year term on the National Council on the Humanities, a position confirmed by the Senate in July 2011. She serves on the Board of Advisors to the John D. and Catherine T. MacArthur Foundation "Digital Media and Learning" book series. A former president of the American Studies Association, she is also a former editor of the journal American Literature.

In 2012, Davidson and Goldberg received Educators of the Year awards from the World Technology Network in recognition of "doing the innovative work of 'the greatest likely long-term significance' in their field" of education through their work as co-founders of HASTAC/MacArthur Foundation Digital Media and Learning Competition. She was named the first educator on the six-person Board of Directors of Mozilla.

In 2016, the New American Colleges and Universities (NAC&U) awarded Davidson the Ernest L. Boyer Award for significant contributions to American higher education.

In 2025, the McGraw Family Foundation awarded Davidson the Harold W. McGraw, Jr. Prize in Education for contributions to higher education.

== Works ==
Davidson is the author or editor of 18 books. Closing: The Life and Death of an American Factory (a collaboration with documentary photographer Bill Bamberger) was a recipient of the Mayflower Cup Award for Non-Fiction. The photographs from Closing traveled to museums around the U.S. for four years, including the Smithsonian Museum of American History.

She served as General Editor of the Oxford University Press Early American Women Writers Series and, with Ada Norris, edited American Indian Stories, Legends and Other Writings by Zitkala-Sa, the first Penguin Classic devoted to a Native American author.

Her book, Now You See It: How the Brain Science of Attention Will Transform the Way We Live, Work, and Learn was named by Publishers Weekly "one of the top ten science books" of the Fall 2011 season". One reviewer from The Washington Independent Review of Books opined that Davidson "makes the case, through numerous examples and lucid argument, that we can do much better in aligning our schools, our workplaces and our lives, and that this will make us not only more successful as a society but more fulfilled as individuals."

In 2023, Davidson and Christina Katopodis were awarded the Frederic W. Ness Book Award from the Association of American Colleges and Universities for their book The New College Classroom. At this time, Davidson was the only author to have received this award twice, having won in 2019 for her book The New Education: How to Revolutionize the University to Prepare Students for a World in Flux.

=== Books ===
- The New College Classroom with Christina Katopodis (2022)
- The New Education: How to Revolutionize the University to Prepare Students for a World in Flux (2017)
- Field Notes for 21st Century Literacies: A Guide to New Theories, Methods, and Practices for Open Peer Teaching and Learning (2013)
- Now You See It: How the Brain Science of Attention Will Transform the Way We Live, Work, and Learn (2011)
- "The Future of Thinking: Learning Institutions in a Digital Age" with David Theo Goldberg (2010)
- Closing: The Life and Death of an American Factory, with Bill Bamberger (1998)
- The Oxford Companion to Women's Writing in the United States with Linda Wagner-Martin (1995)
- The Oxford Book of Women's Writing in the United States, with Linda Wagner-Martin (1995)
- Thirty-Six Views of Mount Fuji: On Finding Myself in Japan (1993; expanded edition, 2004)
- The Book of Love: Writers and Their Love Letters (1992)
- Reading in America: Literature and Social History (1989)
- Revolution and the Word: The Rise of the Novel in America (1986; expanded edition 2004)
- The Experimental Fictions of Ambrose Bierce: Structuring the Ineffable (1984)
- Critical Essays on Ambrose Bierce (1982)
