= Sharon Daniel =

American digital media artist

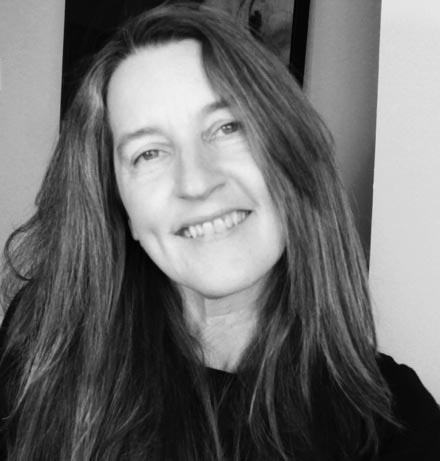
- Education: MFA University of Tennessee, Knoxville; MM University of Texas, Austin; BM Baylor University
- Known for: New Media Art, Film, Digital Media
- Notable work: Public Secrets, Need_X_Change, Narrative Contingencies, Palabras
- Awards: 2008 Media Arts Fellowship from the Tribeca Film Institute Honoree at the 11th Annual Webby Awards

Sharon Daniel is a digital media artist and a professor in the Film and Digital Media department and serves as chair for the Digital Arts and New Media MFA program at the University of California, Santa Cruz. Along with teaching classes about digital media, Daniel does field research for new media projects. Her essays have been published in analytical and research journals such as Sarai and Leonardo. Selected projects of Daniel's have been presented at festivals, including the Lincoln Center Festival, the Dutch Electronic Arts Festival, Ars Electronica, and the Corcoran Biennial.

Daniel is an activist involved with the organization Justice Now, and her association with it allowed her to circumvent the media ban enacted on all of the California Department of Corrections facilities in 1993. She was able to gain media access due to her role as a legal advocate for Justice Now, which allowed her the opportunity to speak with several inmates and document their stories. Daniel's experiences with inmates in California's Department of Corrections led to the creation of Public Secrets.

Daniel's theory on databases has been published in Database Aesthetics. Her article, "The Database: An Aesthetics of Dignity", illustrates how they can be used as an aesthetic that interacts with cultural or social aesthetics.

== Projects ==
=== Palabras, 2004-2006 ===
Palabras was an interactive archive that was composed of digital images and videos created by communities from San Francisco, California; Buenos Aires, Argentina; and Darfur, Sudan. Its goal was to foster relationships between the different communities through the sharing of digital images and video.

=== Public Secrets, 2008 ===
Public Secrets is an interactive website with sound clips and textual narratives from female inmates in California state prisons. It addresses the problem of secrecy among the growing number of prisons. Daniel narrates the opening sequence. It details the personal accounts of the women in the facilities, and it exposes ideas of "the existence of the Prison Industrial Complex, its pervasive network of monopolies, [and] its human rights abuses". Many of the stories have been censored because of an imposed media ban on all facilities within the California Department of Corrections.

=== Blood Sugar, 2011 ===
Blood Sugar, like Public Secrets, provides an interactive interface to an audio archive of stories. These stories are from injection drug users. Steve Anderson notes that "Like Public Secrets, Blood Sugar aims to fill a gap in the cultural discourse surrounding disenfranchised individuals and stigmatized communities by simply making their voices available to be heard." This work, originally published in Vectors Journal, is featured in The NEXT Museum, Archive, and Preservation Space. Marjorie Luesebrink reviewed Sharon Daniels Blood Sugar in #WomenTechLit as a landmark innovation.

=== Inside the Distance, 2013 ===
This collection of interviews documents mediation practices in Belgium between offenders and crime victims. This interactive documentary focuses on restorative justice, which brings victims and offenders face-to-face, facilitated by mediators. This project has been exhibited at the European Forum for Restorative Justice and the U.S. National Center on Restorative Justice.

=== Undoing Time, 2019 ===
This multimedia installation, with online archives, combines the flags, targets, and uniforms prisoners make with testimonies from incarcerated men and women. These stories cover "a wide array of issues central to historical work on the carceral state: police brutality, prison labor, solitary confinement, felony disfranchisement, unnatural disasters, and violations of people's civil, constitutional, and human rights.
