= Now You See Me =

Now You See Me may refer to:

- Now You See Me (franchise)
  - Now You See Me (film), a 2013 heist film
  - Now You See Me 2, the 2016 sequel
  - Now You See Me: Now You Don't, the 2025 sequel
- "Now You See Me", a 1986 story by Sheri Lee Morton, appearing in Shadows
- "Now You See Me", a 1996 episode of 7th Heaven
- Now You See Me, a 2002 novel by Tina Wainscott
- "Now You See Me...", an episode of Harry and His Bucket Full of Dinosaurs
- Now You See Me, a 2009 graphic novel by Glen Downey
- "Now You See Me", a song from the 2010 album Does It Look Like I'm Here? by Emeralds
- "Now You See Me", a song from the 2016 album Jay Chou's Bedtime Stories by Jay Chou
- "Now You See Me", a 2019 mystery novel by Chris McGeorge

== See also ==
- Now You See Me, Now You Don't (disambiguation)
- Now You See It, Now You Don't (disambiguation)
- Now You See It (disambiguation)
