= David Theo Goldberg =

South African social scientist (born 1952)

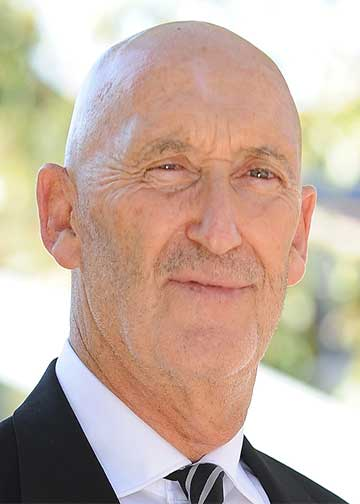
- Goldberg in 2023
- Born: 1952 (age 73–74); South Africa
- Education: University of Cape Town; Graduate Center of the City University of New York
- Occupation: Professor
- Employer: University of California, Irvine

David Theo Goldberg (born 8 January 1952) is a South African professor working in the United States, known for his work in critical race theory, the digital humanities, and the state of the university.

== Biography ==
Goldberg was born and raised in South Africa, and earned degrees in economics, politics, and philosophy from the University of Cape Town. Moving to the United States, he earned a PhD in philosophy from the Graduate Center of the City University of New York in 1985. While completing his PhD, he co-founded Metafilms, a film and music-video production company; among other things, it produced an award-winning film on Robben Island and the music video for Kurtis Blow's "Basketball".

Goldberg pursued a full-time academic career in 1987. From 1990 to 2000, he was professor at Arizona State University, where he directed the School of Justice Studies from 1995 to 2000. From 2000 to 2022, he was director of the systemwide University of California Humanities Research Institute. He is also Distinguished Professor of Anthropology as well as Comparative Literature and Criminology, Law, and Society at the University of California, Irvine (UC Irvine). Furthermore, Goldberg holds an assoiation with the UCI Critical Theory Institute as a Fellow of the institution.

== Research and projects ==
Goldberg is a leading scholar of critical race theory and has delivered invited lectures on this subject at universities across the world (listen to a KPFA interview). His work is the subject of "On the State of Race Theory: A Conversation with David Theo Goldberg". Goldberg's extensive research ranges over issues of political theory, race and racism, ethics, law and society, critical theory, cultural studies, digital humanities, and university studies.

Together with Cathy Davidson, then of Duke University, and Kevin Franklin who at that time worked for UCHRI, Goldberg founded the Humanities, Arts, Science and Technology Advanced Collaboratory (HASTAC) to advance partnerships between the human sciences, arts, social sciences and technology and supercomputing interests for advancing research, teaching and public outreach. Davidson and Goldberg have published essays promoting the creative and dynamic use of digital technologies to advance research, teaching and learning in the humanities, arts, and social sciences. Goldberg was the executive director of the MacArthur Digital Media and Learning Research Hub at UC Irvine, and he directed the Digital Media and Learning Competition, an annual international contest awarding up to $2 million per year to promote transformative learning practices through the application of digital technology. For this work, he was recognized both by the World Technology Network (with Cathy Davidson) and President Bill Clinton at the Clinton Global Initiative (with the MacArthur Foundation's Connie Yowell, and the Mozilla Foundation's Mark Surman).

== Books and publications ==
Goldberg has authored a number of books, including: "The War on Critical Race Theory: Or, the Remaking of Racism (2023) "Dread: Facing Futureless Futures" (2021); Are We All Postracial Yet? (2015); Sites of Race (2014); The Future of Thinking: Learning Institutions in a Digital Age (2009); The Future of Learning Institutions in a Digital Age (2009); The Threat of Race (2008); The Racial State (2002); Racial Subjects: Writing on Race in America (1997); Racist Culture: Philosophy and the Politics of Meaning (1993); and Ethical Theory and Social Issues: Historical Texts and Contemporary Readings (1989/1995).

He has edited or co-edited several collections, including Anatomy of Racism (1990); Jewish Identity (1993); and Multiculturalism: A Critical Reader (1995); A Companion to Racial and Ethnic Studies (2002); Between Law and Culture (2002); Postcolonialism: A Reader (2005); A Companion to Gender Studies (2005); Race Critical Theories (2007); and was the founding co-editor of Social Identities: Journal for the Study of Race, Nation and Culture.

Goldberg is also the creator of the online digital project Blue Velvet: Re-Dressing New Orleans in Katrina's Wake, an interactive look at the effects of Hurricane Katrina on the city of New Orleans based on his article "Deva-stating Disasters: Race in the Shadow(s) of New Orleans".
