= RES (magazine) =

US magazine

- Categories: Culture magazine
- Frequency: Bi-monthly
- Founder: David Latimer, Jonathan Wells, Karol Martesko-Fenster
- First issue: August 1997
- Final issue: October 2006
- Company: RES Media Group
- Country: United States
- Based in: New York City
- Language: English
- Website: RES
- ISSN: 1539-4654

RES was a bi-monthly magazine chronicling the best in cutting-edge film, music, art, design and culture. The magazine was launched with a preview issue in January 1997 at the Sundance Film Festival. The full-length premiere issue debuted in August 1997 with music video directors Jonathan Dayton and Valerie Faris on the cover. Subsequent issues featured innovative filmmakers and artists such as Chris Cunningham, Michel Gondry, Spike Jonze, Lars von Trier, Björk, Radiohead, and Takagi Masakatsu.

RES was headquartered in New York City. When the magazine first launched, it carried the tagline "The Magazine of Digital Filmmaking".

Jonathan Wells served as the editor-in-chief and later editorial director, while Karol Martesko-Fenster served as publisher.

In July 2000, Holly Willis took over as editor-in-chief and oversaw a redesign of the magazine by Trollback + Company. Starting with the September/October 2002 issue, the magazine evolved into a lifestyle magazine for creators covering the fields of film, music, art and design. Since the redesign, all issues of the magazine were bundled with a DVD that was sent to subscribers. The DVDs featured short films, music videos and music. RES was the first U.S. publication to include a DVD with every issue of the print publication.

The October 2006 issue of RES was the last issue to be printed. A new hybrid magazine format was supposed to be launched by RES in 2007, and was intended to be published in several media. However, it was not materialized.

RES was published by RES Media Group, which also produced the international touring film festival, RESFest.
