= Time-based media =

Art genre

Time-based media is a term coined by museum conservators for durational works of art that unfold over a period of time. This work often relies on technology, but includes mediums such as performance art and social practice. In the late 1990s, various institutions and organizations started forming think-tanks and working groups to develop standard practices for the acquisition, analysis, and care for these works over time.

== Time-based media conservation ==
Time-based media art presents unique challenges for the field of conservation. While early media conservators often came from traditional sculpture conservation backgrounds, contemporary media conservators benefit from having diverse backgrounds and experiences. The American Institute for Conservation formed the Electronic Media Group in 1998. The variable media initiative was active at the Guggenheim from 1999 to 2004. Matters in Media Art – a collaboration between the New Art Trust, MoMA, SFMoMA, and the Tate – launched in 2005 to help institutions, collectors, and conservators keep works of media art alive. NYU launched the Time-based Media Art Conservation Education Program in the fall of 2018 under the guidance of Christine Frohnert and Hannelore Roemich. In recent decades, various major institutions such as the Whitney, the Museum of Modern Art, The Met, the Solomon R. Guggenheim Museum, and The Smithsonian have appointed trained time-based media conservators to care for their growing collections of variable media.

== Collectors ==
Outside of institutions, major collectors of time-based media art include Robert Rosenkranz, Ingvild Goetz, Julia Stoschek, and Pamela and Richard Kramlich.

== In the media ==
The podcast Art and Obsolescence features interviews with artists, curators, conservators, and collectors regarding time-based media and its conservation.

== Artists ==
The list below consists of notable artists who create or have created significant works that fall under the time-based media category:

- Jon Klein (musician), guitarist for Siouxsie and the Banshees
- Ai Weiwei
- Alan Michelson
- Alvin Lucier
- American Artist
- Ana Mendieta
- Annea Lockwood
- Annie Sprinkle
- Arthur Jafa
- Beryl Korot
- Bill Viola
- Bruce Nauman
- Carolee Schneemann
- Candice Breitz
- Christian Marclay
- Dumb Type
- Doug Aitken
- E. Jane
- Gary Hill
- George Bures Miller
- Georges Lentz
- Hito Steyerl
- Ian Cheng
- Joan Jonas
- John Akomfrah
- Janet Cardiff
- Jenny Holzer
- Jon Rubin
- Laurie Anderson
- Lenka Clayton
- Lynn Hershman Leeson
- Matthew Barney
- Martine Syms
- Meriem Bennani
- Miranda July
- Nam June Paik
- Olafur Eliasson
- Pierre Huyghe
- Pipilotti Rist
- Rafael Lozano-Hemmer
- Richard Mosse
- Shigeko Kubota
- Shirin Neshat
- Shu Lea Cheang
- Sondra Perry
- Steven Vitiello
- Susan Philipsz
- Tacita Dean
- Tourmaline
- Team Lab
- Valie Export
- WangShui
- Yoko Ono

== See also ==
- Performance art
- Experimental film
- Compression artifact
- New media art
- New media
- Virtual art
- Interactive art
- Sound art
- Social Practice
- Internet art
- Digital art
