= Digital film festivals =

Type of film festival

Digital film festivals are a type of film festival that emerged in the mid-to-late 1990s. They specifically showcase artists and filmmakers who utilize the tools of desktop digital filmmaking, as opposed to the analog filmmaking techniques that had previously dominated the industry.

From their inception, these festivals connected independent filmmakers and popularized digital film techniques, laying the groundwork for the evolution of the film industry towards digital cinematography. Today, digital films and animated films are now commonly found in mainstream film festivals.

These festivals stretch the traditional boundaries of "film festivals" by including hybrid works from internet art, CGI, computer and video gaming, streaming video, music videos, and other mediums.

== History ==
The earliest digital film festivals included the MiniDV Festival (now called The Digital Video Festival) in the U.S. state of Los Angeles; Low Res (later to split into the DFilm and RESFest events); onedotzero; and Exploding Cinema (the International Film Festival Rotterdam digital cinema sidebar).

Other digital film festivals include .Mov (Japan), Darklight (Ireland), Bifilm (Germany), MP4Fest at Silver Lake Film Festival (Los Angeles, CA), 0110 (India), Clone (Norway), as well as onedotzero's international network of events across 60 cities worldwide, among others.

In 2008, the Paso Digital Film Festival set new standards and for six years has moved between #1 and #3 on all of the major search engines when "digital film festivals" is searched. The event was held in November 2008, and was attended by Clint Eastwood and 20 people from his film company Malpaso including his Academy Award-winning editor Joel Cox. Also attending were Sir Nigel Sinclair, Cass Warner the granddaughter of Jack Warner, musicians Johnny Rivers, Ramblin' Jack Elliott, Kyle Eastwood, TV actors Gary Conway and Max Gail, Kevin Bacon and his band The Bacon Brothers. The festival included a day of 3-D with some of the early pioneers in 3-D from Los Angeles attending and showing independent 3D movies. Elements of the festival were streamed live online from the website.

In 2013, the Digital Media Festival in Silicon Valley set another standard with a full shift from the world of "film" to the new age of "digital media" and staged in Silicon Valley, California. It was attended by filmmakers from San Francisco and Los Angeles, including Cass Warner, from the Warner Brothers family, Len Dell'Amico, the long time music video producer known as "the Grateful Dead's Video Guy", the author and photographer Chris Felver, the author and Stanford University professor Fred Turner and the actor Max Gail.

== List of digital film festivals ==
- Digital MediaFestival.com 2012 - 2014
- FFTG Awards
- MP4Fest at Silver Lake Film Festival - digital festival-within-a-festival
- onedotzero
- Paso Digital Film Festival from 2008- to 2014
- RESFest
- Streaming Festival

== See also ==
- List of new media art festivals
