= Conservation and restoration of time-based media art =

Study and practice of conserving time-based media

The conservation and restoration of time-based media art is the practice of preserving time-based works of art. Preserving time-based media is a complex undertaking within the field of conservation that requires an understanding of both physical and digital conservation methods. It is the job of the conservator to evaluate possible changes made to the artwork over time. These changes could include short, medium, and long-term effects caused by the environment, exhibition-design, technicians, preferences, or technological development. The approach to each work is determined through various conservation and preservation strategies, continuous education and training, and resources available from institutions and organization across the globe.

== Time-based media art ==
Time-based media refers to works of art that unfold over a period of time utilizing elements such as light, sound, or movement. Many time-based works rely on technology, creating a challenge for conservators as these technologies obsolesce. Time-based media includes installations composed of video, audio, film, slides, and software based art. This term also describes works of art created for the internet.

Works containing video and/or audio may at times be referred to as four-dimensional (4D), referencing time as the fourth dimension. Terms that may also refer to time-based media art include video art, new media, variable media, electronic art, moving-image art, sound art, technology-based art, and expanded media.

Time-based media collections are housed in libraries, archives, museums, and private collections. Video art differs from professional or commercial filmmaking. Many video works are captured on non-commercial film stocks such as 8 mm film or 16 mm film, videotape, or as digital recordings.

The complexity of preserving time-based media art presents technical and ethical challenges. Obsolescence and failing equipment contribute to instabilities due to the ever evolving nature of technology. These artworks only exist when installed, creating a unique experience in which the art work will be represented in a new way every time it is displayed. Because of this, preserving time-based media art's fragile identity is an aspect that conservators must actively monitor.

== Preservation and conservation strategies ==
Guidelines for collecting and preserving time-based media art are still evolving, and though much progress has been made in the conservation operations and process standards have not yet been reached. Despite having been recorded in a similar manner, generally, video and film must be looked at differently because of the difference between the two mediums. Thus procedures for preservation and conservation will vary between the mediums.

Video is a coded system, the information stored on the magnetic or digital tape can be retrieved only with a specific electronic playback device. The images on the film strip, however, are legible on their own, though the projector provides the only means by which they can be viewed. When collecting film and video art, a master and at least one sub-master should be obtained. In some cases, and exhibition copy will be obtained as well, in other cases it will be copied by the museum. Some conservators recommend that sub-masters be in digital format, as analog tape suffers from generation loss, each time it is duplicated.

Digital formats can suffer from generation loss as well, but it can be avoided through good practice. The sub-master will be used to make new copies of the work and the format of the sub-master needs to be updated when it nears obsolescence. Obsolescence is of particular concern to time-based media art conservationists, as many artworks are tied to hardware which is no longer manufactured or supported. File formats reaching obsolescence are another concern, as operating systems change and old formats are replaced by newer ones. Fortunately there are some methods in place to help prevent the total loss of time-based media artworks.

The Guggenheim Museum provides preservation models for Analog Standard Definition Video, Digital Standard Definition Video, and High Definition Video.

=== Preventive measures ===
The protection against physical loss, technological obsolescence, and digital loss of the file are important aspects of a holistic approach to preservation strategies. Measures must also be taken against environmental factors, such as humidity and pests to ensure the long-term preservation of any physical media. Integrated pest management is an important part of any museum preventive conservation plan.

Preventive measures do not stop deterioration fully; they merely prolong the time it takes for the media to deteriorate. Some media, like certain film stocks, are more stable than others, and some media, such as magnetic videotape, are potentially unstable, requiring different conservation approaches.

==== Storage and maintenance of physical objects ====
Good storage practices help ensure the long life of an artwork and should be incorporated into a museum's conservation strategy. Storage practices vary by media, so a museum will need to employ a range of storage options to best care for their time-based media art collections. A variety of physical media, such as film, tape, and disks must be stored properly to prevent physical. Prevention is the best measure of protection against loss, and when successful has the ability to outlive the equipment it was made for. While how a media is stored is dependent on its format's needs, most generally requires cool temperatures and low humidity.

===== Film =====
Film reels are typically stored in their metal or plastic canisters, laid flat horizontally, and stacked on top of each other. Film must be stored in a climate-controlled room due to its susceptibility to heat and humidity causing the film to degrade. Film may also have additional special storage considerations, which may involve low temperature freezes to retard further damage. How stable the film is depends largely on the type of stock, but film, if well taken care of, is generally able to last for long periods of time.

Film has been made on a variety of materials, including nitrate-based film stock (see: Nitrocellulose) and acetate-based film stocks, and polyester-backed film. Due to that difference, each of these film types have a different conservation strategy. Nitrate film must be handled carefully, as it is highly flammable. Cellulose acetate film stocks are at risk of vinegar syndrome, which causes a vinegar like odor due to a reaction when moisture of the film interact with the air in the environment. Whereas polyester-backed films are not susceptible to vinegar syndrome or flammable, but over time film, generally has the possibility to shrink, wrap, or have the emulsion pull off in not properly stored.

Film is stored in a colder environment than other time-based media and different types of film have different optimum storage temperatures.

- Color film – In order to prevent color fading store at coldest possible temperature. While color film can handle temperature up to 30 °F (−1 °C) with humidity levels of 25–35%, the preferred temperature is 0 °F (−18 °C).
- Black-and-white film – Stored best at 25 to 50 °F (−4 to 10 °C) with 25–35% humidity.

===== Magnetic videotape =====
Magnetic videotape was never meant to last and with a beginning life expectancy of often only a few decades the media often has a short life, especially if exposed to warm or humid conditions. When videotapes are not stored properly their short life expectancy becomes even shorter. Storing the format upright and in a dry, cool, and dust free environment will aid videotapes to have a lifespan of a few decades. Videotapes may be stored in polypropylene cases, but without paper inside the cases and always be stored at temperatures above 46 °F, as lower temperatures cause deterioration. Magnetic media should also be kept away from magnetic sources, which could demagnetize them.

===== Optical digital media =====
Optical media, such as DVDs and CDs, are susceptible to the exposure of dirt, dust, and scratches from rough handling or improper storage conditions that cause deterioration. Optical media should be stored in hard plastic jewel cases or other inert plastic containers and should avoid storage in plastic sleeves. Although optical media can handle higher humidity (33–45%) and temperatures (62–68 °F or 17–20 °C) than other mediums, cooler temperatures around 50 °F (10 °C) with 20–50% humidity is recommended to ensure a longer life for DVDs and CDs.

===== Display equipment and playback devices =====
Because time-based media is dependent on technology to view it, playback devices must also be stored. This is especially significant in time-based media art, as specific types of technological devices may be required for the art work or preferred by the artist. Maintaining the technology that the time-based media art is played on is one conservation strategy, and what is stored depends on the equipment device. Consumer products, for example, are not meant for repeated viewing on such a large scale and are usually not expected to have a long enough life to maintain the device well into the future.

Due to rapid changes in video technology and the high cost of maintaining and storing equipment, storage and maintenance of some playback devices may not practical for a museum as a primary strategy. The choice of how the time-based media art will be preserved is a collaborative decision made by both the artist and the museum conservators. Determining if and how the technology or device will be exchanged in the conservation of the artwork should be made based on the relationship between the technical aspects of the artwork and the artist's intention. The conservator also must be fully informed how the artwork's aesthetic, concept, and historical identity is impacted by the characteristics and function of the technology involved.

Museums do at times need to store obsolete technology though, such as VCRs, old computers, video game systems, etc., particularly if they have been customized for the artwork by the artist. In these cases, conservation strategies could included acquiring spare parts early on in the acquisition process and before the technology is discontinued, making new components if necessary, and/or inexact substitution which follows the best match method of creating replicas of specific pieces.

Unlike video equipment, film equipment is far more stable and museums may be more likely to conserve the equipment along with the media because there is less upkeep and film equipment does not need constant replacement due to obsolescence. A working projector will always run film. Technological devices should be stored in a clean, climate controlled environment, as humidity can be damaging to electronic components.

While conserving and keeping equipment is still necessary in many cases, emulation technology has begun to aid in the conservation of many time-based media arts. This advancement in the digital preservation and conservation of time-based media art allows conservators to save media in which their equipment has become obsolete. In return, the software or artwork's longevity can increase immensely.

===== Born-digital media art =====
The rapid growth of born-digital time-based media art has caused many challenges to conservators and museums on how to properly care and preserve such medias. Created as binary data, born-digital works both the consideration of the artist's intent and IT-bases infrastructure in order to preserve these works in the best manner. The software and file format of born-digital works are susceptible to many issues involving integrity, data corruption, and obsolescence.

==== Digital preservation ====
Digital files must be preserved and stored as well, otherwise they also risk degradation. Due to the large amounts of storage space that may be needed, museums may want to employ the use of a digital repository that offers digital preservation as a service. Repositories will keep the digital file stored, perform migration by moving the old format to a new and usable format, and typically offer some guarantee of preservation for a specified period of time. Some digital preservation strategies include backups, migration, bit-level preservation, and emulation. Metadata is another aspect of preservation that gathers information about the item in order to preserve textual information of the work.

Artists may also wish to seek out a repository for storage of their digital artwork. Rhizome's Artbase is an online archive that seeks to preserve contemporary digital art. Part of digital media storage is to ensure continuity of the digital file through format changes, thus migration becomes a likely strategy. Some conservators recommend that medium upgrades take place at least every five years, making duplication a main strategy of digital conservation.

Time-based media art that either has an inherent digital component (i.e. a born-digital work) or has been digitized will have the need to be preserved digitally. While this work may not entirely be completed by the conservator, conservators will be aware of the methods used to preserve digital media. The Variable Media Approach, a strategy that comes from the Guggenheim Museum's Variable Media Initiative research, offers a way to gain a definition of a work to be translated independently from an obsolete medium. It is a methodology that approaches a work as independent from its media, so that it may be thought of as a behavior and not something tied to its hardware. This process looks to preserve works despite the uncertainty of technological developments of the future. By making a work independent from its medium, the Variable Media Approach hopes to ensure the life of the artwork well into the future, beyond the obsolescence of all current technology.

The approach encompasses four aspects: Storage, Migration, Emulation, and Reinterpretation.

1. Storage – Keeping time-based media art in a controlled environment is an example of storage of time-based media art. Overall storage is the most basic and used museum strategy. Storage of time-based media includes the storage and preservation of the equipment for types of media that uses it to display. For digital aspects backups and bit-level preservation also are taken into consideration in storage procedures.
2. Migration – Migration simply means to copy the files to new storage media and helps the conservators preserve the original aspects of the work. Changing the items file format to be able to make sure the work is saved is not lost due to format obsolescence.
3. Emulation – Emulation is not as straight forward, it involves some amount of interpretation and is more an imitation of the original work. The powerful technique in the context of digital media that offers a way of running an out-of-date computer on a contemporary one. Emulation looks to render the original digital work through an imitations of the software or hardware it was produced on.
4. Reinterpretation – Reinterpretation is the most radical strategy, as it involves a full recreation of the work.

When obsolescence is media storage and formats becomes a reality for time-based art, works will usually be migrated to more accessible and updated formats or software. This will mean updating the file format so that it is playable on newer technology. In some cases, this may not be in keeping with the artist's wishes, as he or she may wish to continue viewings of their work in a specific format. If the format is integral to the work, then upkeep becomes more involved and maintaining the usability of the artwork against the odds of obsolescence in both media and technology becomes a major preservation challenge. For this reason, it is encouraged that artists allow for some flexibility in future iterations of the artwork.

=== Examination and documentation ===
Examining and documenting the physical state of an object is an important part of understanding its overall condition. The process of examination and documentation will alert conservators to any problems that need immediate or future attention. In order to identify the conservation risks and needs, as a simple physical examination will not be able to identify every issue, it is important to follow five steps of examining the container, check for odor, examine the surfaces and edges, identify the format, and play the tape.

==== Physical examination ====
The physical components of time-based media art must be examined in order to understand their physical condition. With film, physical examination will identify a variety of deterioration processes, such as vinegar syndrome in safety films or color dye fading in color film stock. It is important to identify these early, not only to try to prevent further deterioration, but to intervene with treatment or to make a duplicate copy. Without the examination process, time-based media may degrade beyond repair and possibly be lost entirely.

==== Condition assessments ====
Condition assessments are procedures that are carried out by conservators or other collections care professionals to document the overall condition of an object. These assessments are necessary for all the types of media and technology associated with time-based media art. The assessments stay in the object's file and give future conservators insight into the object's life history. They are performed upon intake of an object into a collection, before and after the object goes on loan, and as necessary. They make note of any physical issues that may be present, such as tears, stains, scratches, or other damage. Film is especially vulnerable to tears and warping, while DVDs and CDs scratch easily. Other issues cannot be seen, such as demagnetization of tape, and require other methods of examination. After the condition of a physical object is assessed, the examiner may recommend treatment if necessary.

Independent Media Arts Preservation (IMAP) recommends taking certain steps to assessing the condition of time-based media:

1. Examine the container – damage on the outside of a container could mean damaged media inside the container. Cases should be examined for dents, stains, and molds or fungus.
2. Check for odor – it may be an indication that the media has deteriorated. Vinegar syndrome emits a vinegar-like odor when present. If media smells musty it could indicate magnetic decay.
3. Examine the surface and the edges – look for powder, dust, dirt and residue, they may indicate deterioration or surface contamination.
4. Identify the format – Knowing the media format is important to proper handling.
5. Play the tape – In some cases it may be necessary to play the tape, a process that if not handled carefully could damage the media. Noise, shifts in color, timing issues, and distortion can all be detected while playing the media back.

==== Further documentation ====
Because time-based media has a fourth dimension of time, not present in other types of works, additional documentation to understand the allographic nature of the media may be required, and is recommended. Such documents include the Guggenheim Museum's Iteration Report or Variable Media Questionnaire (VMQ), developed as part of the Variable Media Initiative. The reports collect information about the nature or behavior of the art, so that future curators and conservators can understand it from an artistic and behavioral point of view, as well as a technical point of view. This allows museum professionals to recreate, or make a new iteration, of a particular time-based media artwork.

The most common behaviors assigned to time-based media art are interactive, encoded, and networked. Because a new viewing of a time-based work can only be an iteration, by making each viewing as close to the artist's desires as possible, the nature of the artwork is conserved. The reports collect information such as how to install the artwork, what the space (walls, floors, ceilings, additions) should look like and how it should be arranged, how equipment should be installed, and the technical set-up of the work. Each iteration will be dependent on the physical constraints of the room, so that no two installations will be completely alike.

In the VMQ, an artist can order their preferences for technical specifications and whether any technology other than the original is allowed to be used. The reports are an important means of understanding how to set-up a work and make it as close to the prior iterations as possible.

=== Treatment ===
Treatment methods of time-based media art include a mix of both traditional and new techniques. Due to the complex nature of time-based media art, not all of the work will fall to a conservator. Video engineers, programmers, service technicians, media technicians, film-lab professionals and other professionals will aid in the conservation of certain media works and devices due to their complex nature. The maintenance of the technology is an important part of the conservation process for many works of art.

==== Treatment of physical objects ====
Time-based media conservators will treat and maintain a variety of objects, including film reels, projectors, computers, TVs, and other types of technology. In cases of videotape and DVDs, migration of the work to another format will more likely be the case because there are so many types of media that support time-based media art, treatment of each type will vary.

===== Film preservation =====
While the prevention of physical film degradation is important, the preservationist's main goal is to preserve the image, as the film itself often decays rapidly and beyond repair. Film preservation falls into several categories:

1. Conservation: keeping the original film artifact protected
2. Duplication: creation of a surrogate copy
3. Restoration: reconstruction of a specific version of a film. Including the piecing together of footage from all known sources.
4. Access: presenting the film to the public and the procedures necessary to present the content

Film restoration will involve the use of duplicates, not the originals. Common treatment for film stock include duplication and repairing tears. Duplication of an original to a new and stable film stock is a continuing process. Due to the nature of the material eventually the duplicate will degrade causing the need for a continual upkeep in order to be successful in film preservation. Repairing tears in the physical film is a tedious task. Ways in which film can be repaired from tears include using splicing tape, film cement, making splices, and repairing perforations by replacing torn sprockets holes.

The access stage of film preservation also provides researcher the ability to use the scholarly materials otherwise unavailable.

===== Digital preservation =====
There is a growing need to understand digital processes of duplication as well. While much duplication still requires that film be moved to a new and stable film stock, digital has been advancing as a method of duplication, though many argue it should not be used alone as digital files are unproven in the long term Film Preservation.

In the case of technology, treatment will look more like maintenance and will be required to keep the object functional. Obsolescence of technology is a major concern as discussed under Storage and Maintenance of Physical Objects. Due to media and equipment obsolescence emulation has become a major component in the preservation of time-based media art and has allowed conservationist and specialist to save works by its use.

== Education, training, and outreach ==
=== Research ===
The history of time-based media art is not long, compared to more traditional forms of art, but is rapidly growing at an immense rate. While more research is still necessary in the field in order to move toward and achieve standardizations of practice, organizations and institutions a like have made conservation and preservation of time-based media art a priority in the last decade as the growth of technology and its preservation has become a primary issue.

==== Research contributions ====
The Andrew W. Mellon Foundation has been a major advocate of the research and conservation of time-based media art worldwide. The foundation has contributing in the funding of a multitude of grants, totaling around $5.6 million as of 2018, to institutions such as The Art Institute of Chicago, Museum of Modern Art, the Tate, and New York University Institute of Fine Arts.

The New Art Trust founded by the Kramlichs has been a supporter of time-based media art with a goal to fund research to develop the best practices for storage, display, and overall conservation of media art. The New Art trust has been involved in many research and projects based on time-based media art at institutions such as the media art center Bay Area Video Coalition (BVAC), the Museum of Modern Art (MoMA), San Francisco Museum of Modern Art (SFMOMA), and Tate, London.

==== Research projects ====
Some major research projects into time-based media include the Guggenheim Museum's Variable Media Initiative, the Smithsonian's Time Based Media and Digital Art Working Group, the Tate Museum's Media in Transition and Things Change, New York University Institute of Fine Arts' It's About Time! Building a New Discipline: Time-Based Media Art Conservation, and the Art Institute of Chicago's UNFIXED - Material Challenges in Contemporary Art.

===== The Variable Media Initiative =====
The Guggenheim Museum's research has led to the Variable Media Approach, and the Variable Media Questionnaire, a tool of the Variable Media Approach. Beginning in 1999, the Variable Media Initiative is one of the museum's most well-known research initiatives. Originally funded by a grant from the Daniel Langlois Foundation for Art, Science, and Technology in Montreal, Canada, the Variable Media Network (VMN) has grown into a group of international institutions and consultants, including University of Maine, the Berkeley Art Museum/Pacific Film Archives, Franklin Furnace, Rhizome.org, and Performance Art Festival & Archives. It defined a new approach to documenting contemporary artworks dependent on media, by defining the media as "variable", the artwork becomes untangled from its material aspects, allowing preservation of the work through time without loss of meaning.

- Published works include:

Permanence Through Change: The Variable Media Approach.

- Exhibitions and case studies:

Seeing Double: Emulation in Theory and Practice, Spring 2004.

- Symposiums:

Preserving the Immaterial: A Conference on Variable Media, March 2001.

Echoes of Art: Emulation as a Preservation Strategy, May 2004.

===== The Time-Based Media and Digital Art Working Group =====
In 2010 the Smithsonian's Time-Based Media and Digital Art (TBMA) Working Group was born out of the Collaborations in Conserving Time-Based Art symposium. The group includes staff from across the Smithsonian Institution and was developed to work with the Smithsonian's collection, but also to share the information and seek external ties. The group seeks to develop and improve standards for the care of time-based and digital artworks.

- Projects:

Survey of Roles and Practices at the Smithsonian Museums, 2010-2011

Survey of Time-Based Media and Digital Artworks across the Smithsonian Collections, 2011–2012.

Report on the Status and Need for Technical Standards in the care of Time-Based Media and Digital Art, 2013-2014.

Establishing a Time Based Digital Art Conservation Lab at the Smithsonian Institution, 2013.

- Symposiums:

Collaborations in Conserving Time-Based Art, March 2010.

Collecting, Exhibiting, & Preserving Time-Based Media Art, September 2011.

Standards for the Preservation of Time-Based Media Art, September 2012.

Trusted Digital Repositories for Time-Based Media Art, April 2013.

TECHNOLOGY EXPERIMENTS IN ART: Conserving Software-Based Artworks, January 2014.

==== Media in Transition ====
An initiative starting in January 2014, entitled Media in Transition, was created as a conservation and research project at the Tate museum of London. The project, that ran through December 2016, was the follow-up to a successful series of lectures and conference by the Getty Research Institute and the Getty Conservation Institute, entitled Object in Transition. The Media in Transition project included a retreat and an international conference including multiple lectures that looked to cover many themes surrounding time-based media art in correlation to the growing change in technology and how that directly effects the steps museums take in the conservation of time-based media art works for the future.

- Retreat

In preparation for the upcoming conference, New Art Trust held a retreat in October 2015 to discuss case studies specific to the themes for the project. The information and connections gathered at this retreat were then used to cover at the projects November 2015 conference.

- Conference

In a collaboration between the Tate, the Getty Conservation Institute, and Getty Research Institute the large international conference was held at the Tate Modern from November 18–20, 2015. Keynotes from the conference were made by artists Susan Hiller, Runa Islam, and Hito Steyerl. Videos of the content from the conference are available to watch of the Media in Transition project page.

===== Things Change: Conservation and Display of Time-based Media Art =====
The Tate museum and their conservation team produced, Things Change: Conservation and Display of Time-based Media Art, a short documentary film released in 2017. The film directed by Patricia Falcão, follows the work that when in to the four-year project of PERICLES. The film documents the challenges museums face in the conservation and preservation of digital content and the insurance of its longevity.

===== It's About Time! Building a New Discipline: Time-Based Media Art Conservation =====
On the 20-22 of May 2018, New York University Institute of Fine Arts hosted, It's About Time! Building a New Discipline: Time-Based Media Art Conservation, a symposium to discuss the necessary measures and challenges faced in the preserve time-based media that had become a priority to many institutions. Training and educational opportunities was then main goal for the symposium in association with the presentation of the project Time-Based Media Art Conservation Curriculum Development at the Conservation Center at New York University Institute of Fine Arts. The international symposium hosted over 150 individuals from across the globe to speak and participate in lectures and panels on all things related to time-based media art.

===== UNFIXED - Material Challenges in Contemporary Art =====
The Art Institute of Chicago hosted a symposium UNFIXED - Material Challenges in Contemporary Art, on 28–29 June. The purpose of the series of lectures was to create a regional network based on the need to understand the challenges and necessities regarding the changes coming to the art museum operations and the materiality, conservation, and conservation practices of time-based media art.

==== MoMA's Media Conservation Initiative ====
The New York Museum of Modern Art (MoMA) started, the Media Conservation Initiative, a 5-year program with a focus on expanding the field of the preservation and care of time-based media art. Made possible by the Andrew W. Mellon Foundation, the program started in 2017 and will be in its final year as of 2022. The program agenda includes peer forums, workshops, and postgraduate fellowships. So far 4 out of 5 workshops have been held each different in content based on expanding the knowledge to conservators in the field of time-based media art and answering questions in gaps of training and operations.

=== Educational programs ===
Conservation programs specific to and include subjects related to time-based media and time-based media art:

- Bern University of the Arts in Bern, Switzerland offers an MA program for the Conservation of Modern Materials and Media.
- New York University Institute of Fine Arts' Time-based Media Art Conservation program
- Museum of Modern Art's Media Conservation Initiative Fellowships
- The Selznick Graduate Program in Film and Media Preservation at the University of Rochester in New York and
- New York University's Moving Image Archiving and Preservation program.
- At UCLA, there is an M.A. in Moving Image Archive Studies.

The latter three programs deal primarily in archival film preservation, which requires specialized training in a variety of film stocks. A film preservationist must be knowledgeable about and trained to work with many types of film. In a museum context, the film is more likely to be consumer sizes like super 8mm and 16mm, not the 35mm that is used in commercial film making, as they are the preferred medium of artist and amateur filmmakers. Typically, the 35mm stock will be more prevalent in a library or archive. Because of the few formalized education programs in time-based media, most conservators of time-based media art make their way there through a professional path.

=== Professional training ===
==== Independent Media Arts Preservation ====
Independent Media Arts Preservation (IMAP) is a non-profit organization that offers training to professionals within time-based media art preservation to include workshops, cataloging training, public programs, one-on-one assessments, and technical assistance. They provide professionals with the IMAP Preservation Online Resource Guide and provide an overview of preservation of time-based media on their website.

==== Time-Based Media Workshops ====
The Conservation Center of the NYU's Institute of Fine Arts started Workshops based upon the It's About Time symposium held in 2018. Grants donated to NYU's Institute of Fine Arts by the Mellon foundation have aided in the creation of the specialization in Time-based Media Art Conservation in 2018 as a part of NYU's art conservation degree and the creation of the Workshops in Time-based Media Art Conservation. The Workshops in Time-based Media Art Conservation offers a running series of workshops for industry professionals.

==== Smithsonian American Art Museum (SAAM) Professional Programs in Conservation ====
The Smithsonian American Art Museum offers many programs to participate in the conservation of material to professionals in the field. Subject of the Professional Programs in Conservation workshops are based on the topic of time-based media artworks and the best practices for long term preservation and care in collaboration with their SAAM Time-based Media Art Conservation Laboratory.

==== MoMA Media Conservation Initiative Workshops and Expert Discussion Meetings ====
Since 2017 the MoMA has hosts Media Conservation Initiative workshop and expert discussion meetings. This is part of a five-year initiative to share knowledge to professionals in the field of time-based media art. The workshops are led by experts in the field to discuss communication and collaboration across departments and institutions. The workshops are formatted to include discussions, presentation and practical sessions.

==== Met's Time-Based Media Working Group Workshops ====
New York's Metropolitan Museum of Art's staff started, Time-Based Media Working Group, became a museum in 2010 after many employees across 16 department had been struggling with the best practices in preserving time-based media art. The goal of the group was to create a standards for the operations and conservation of time-based media art and to better educate staff in the process. The group hosts specialists from the field to speak at public event lectures and presentations on the topic of time-based media art.

==== Voices in Contemporary Art (VoCA) Workshops ====
With a focus on contemporary art and its production, presentation, and preservation, Voices in Contemporary Art is a non-profit organization based in New York whose priority is to create conversation and interdisciplinary programming in the context of the field. VoCA provides programs to institutions worldwide that has a focus on conservation and the longevity for artist's work in the technology advancing twenty first century. Programs provided by the VoCA include talks, workshops, research, and a journal.

=== Community outreach ===
Festivals such as Portland Institute for Contemporary Art's Time-Based Art Festival take place annually and are reflective of the general acceptance of time-based media art outside the walls of the museum.

== Organizations and professional societies ==
- AIC Electronic Media Group
- The Association of Moving Image Archivists
- International Network For The Conservation Of Contemporary Art (INCCA)
- Andrew W. Mellon Foundation
- Getty Conservation Institute
- Getty Research Institute
- New Art Trust (NAT)
- International Media Arts Preservation (IMAP)
- DOCAM
- Bay Area Video Coalition (BAVC)
- Time-Based Media Art at the Smithsonian
- San Francisco Museum of Modern Art Media Arts
- Time-Based Media Conservation at Tate
- Time-Based Media Conservation at the Solomon R. Guggenheim Museum
- Media Conservation Initiative and Media Conservation Blog at MoMA
- Time-Based Media Art Conservation at New York University (NYU)

== Resources ==
- Variable Media Questionnaire
- Guggenheim Museum Iteration Report
- Texas Commission on the Arts Video Identification Assessment Guide
- Electronic Resource Preservation and Access Network
- Matters in Media Art
- Electronic Arts Intermix (EAI)
- Conservation Online (CoOL) Resources for Conservation Professionals
- Digital Preservation Coalition, Digital Preservation Handbook
- Bay Area Video Coalition Preservation Tools
- Voices in Contemporary Art (VoCA), Artist Interview Workshops
- The Film Preservation Guide: The Basics for Archive, Libraries, and Museums

== See also ==
- Tina Rivers Ryan
- New Media Art Preservation
- Digital Preservation
- Art conservation
- New media art
- Digital media
- Preservation (library and archive)
- Digital obsolescence
- Emulator
- Film preservation
- Digital photograph restoration
- Born-digital
- Conservation and restoration of new media art
- Digital curation
- Conservator (museum)
