= Now You See Me, Now You Don't =

Now You See Me, Now You Don't may refer to:

== Film and television ==
- Now You See Me: Now You Don't, a 2025 film
- "Now You See Me, Now You Don't", a 1986 episode of Pee-wee's Playhouse
- "Now You See Me, Now You Don't", a 2008 episode of America's Next Top Model, Cycle 11
- "Now You See Me, Now You Don't", a 2013 episode in the fourth season of Pretty Little Liars
- Now You See Me, Now You Don't, a 1975 education film by Densey Clyne
- Now You See Me, Now You Don't, a 1994 film with Anthony Wong

== Music ==
- Now You See Me, Now You Don't (album), a 1982 album by Cliff Richard and title-track of the album
- "(Now You See Me) Now You Don't", a 1999 song by Lee Ann Womack

== See also ==
- Now You See Him, Now You Don't, a 1972 Disney film and sequel to The Computer Wore Tennis Shoes
- Now You See Me (disambiguation)
- Now You See It, Now You Don't (disambiguation)
- Now You See It (disambiguation)
