= Holly Willis =

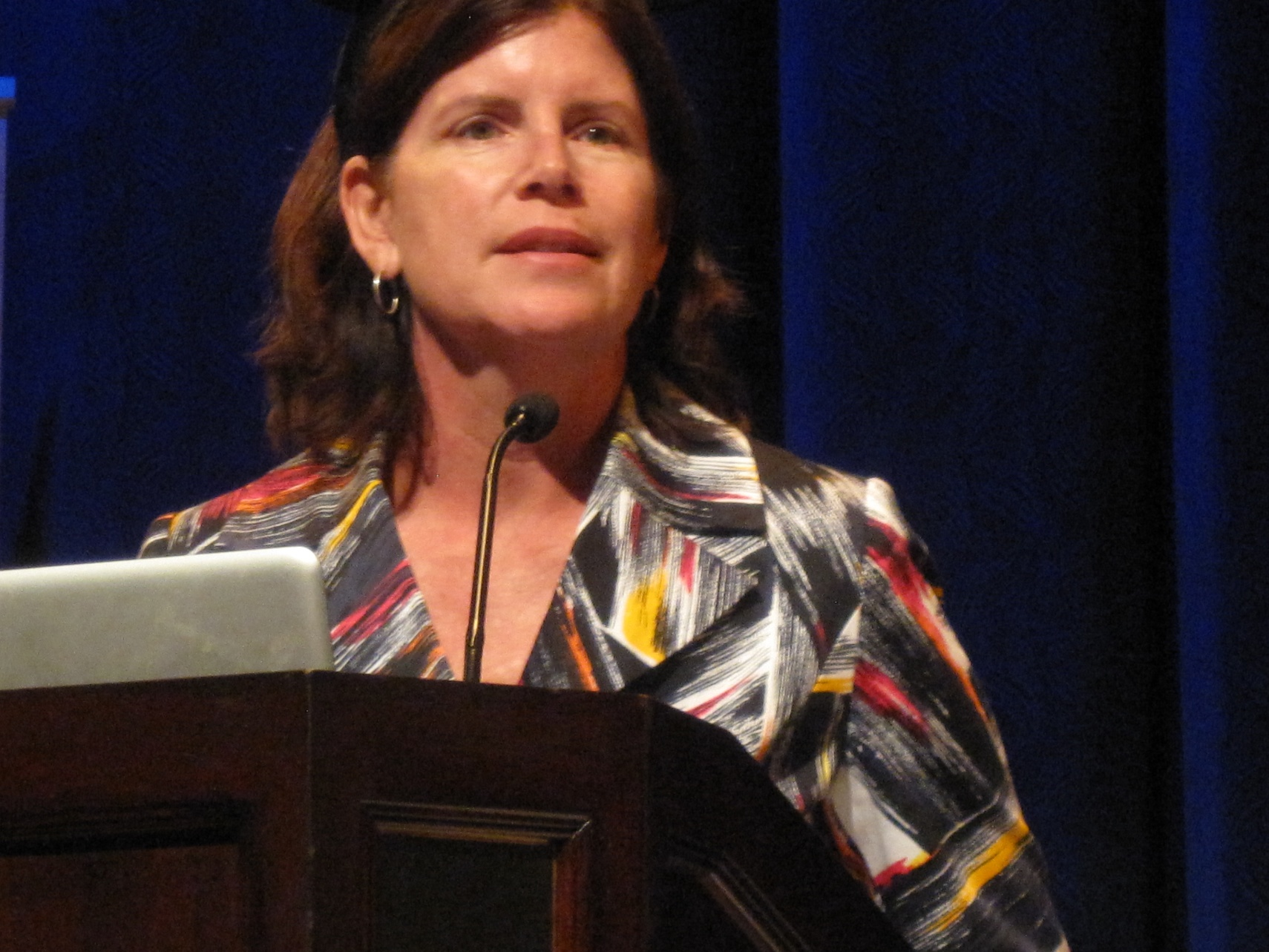
Holly Willis at a conference, 2010

Holly Willis is a Professor and Chair of the Media Arts and Practice division in the USC School of Cinematic Arts United States. Previously, she served as Associate Dean of Research and Founding Chair of Media Arts and Practice, as well as Director of Academic Programs at USC's Institute for Multimedia Literacy. She is former editor of the magazines RES and Filmmaker, of which she is a co-founder. Willis was also the co-curator of the international digital media festival RESFest.

Willis is author of the books Fast Forward: The Future(s) of the Cinematic Arts and New Digital Cinema, both published by Wallflower Press, and editor of the collected volumes Björk Digital, The New Ecology of Things and David O. Russell: Interviews, published by the University Press of Mississippi. She publishes a blog about media art in Los Angeles for KCET and writes a column for Filmmaker Magazine titled "Extra Curricular" that explores the evolution of media education in the United States.
