= Flux Television =

Flux Television was an American pioneering digital culture show that ran on a Public, educational, and government access (PEG) cable TV channel in New York City, San Francisco and San Diego in the mid-1990s. The show predated the electronic music video show Amp that ran on MTV.

Wired magazine proclaimed the show "a half-hour gem, in which electronic music videos collide with excellently reported segments on digital culture." The show received several awards including a Billboard Music Award for Video.

The show had numerous creative collaborators including Jonathan Wells (creative director), designer Bill McMullen (who created the logo), twenty2product (who designed the show's motion graphics sequences), graphic designer David Weissberg, producers Aden Ikram, Randall Hoy and Lisa Braz.

David Weissberg and Jonathan Hale Wells later worked on the LowRes Film and Video Festival together.
