= Now You See It, Now You Don't =

Now You See It, Now You Don't may refer to:

- Now You See It, Now You Don't, a 1968 television movie starring Jonathan Winters
- "Now You See It, Now You Don't: Part One", a 1979 episode of The Jeffersons
- "Now You See It - Now You Don't", a song from the 1981 Frank Zappa album Tinseltown Rebellion
- "Now You See It (Now You Don't)", a song from the 1983 Ozzy Osbourne album Bark at the Moon
- Now You See It... (Now You Don't), a 1990 album by Michael Brecker
- Love: Now You See It... Now You Don't, a 1992 Hong Kong film directed by Mabel Cheung and Alex Law
- Second Foundation, a novel by Isaac Asimov
  - Part I originally published as Now You See It...
  - Part II originally published as ...And Now You Don't

== See also ==
- Now You See Me (disambiguation)
- Now You See Me, Now You Don't (disambiguation)
- Now You See It (disambiguation)
- Now You See Him, Now You Don't, a 1972 Walt Disney film
