= Jonathan Hale Wells =

Jonathan Hale Wells is the co-founder and Head of Programming of RES Media Group, which produces the global touring digital film festival, RESFest, and the digital culture publication, RES Magazine.

Wells’ experience as a cultural entrepreneur and promoter of technology began in high school where he first created an entertainment cable TV show at 16. He went on to publish guidebooks, create a nightclub hotline and produce multimedia events. After college, Wells developed the award-winning cable TV show, Flux Television, that Wired Magazine proclaimed “a half-hour gem, in which electronic music videos collide with excellently reported segments on digital culture.”

In 1995 while working late nights at an interactive film company, Wells co-founded the Low Res Film and Video Festival in the basement of his San Francisco apartment. The festival which ran for two years and appeared in prestigious venues in San Francisco, New York, LA and London grew quickly garnering national press and industry buzz. From the ashes of Low Res, Wells fine-tuned the idea of a touring digital film festival and founded RESFest.
