= HASTAC =

Virtual organization based in US

- Humanities, Arts, Science and Technology Alliance and Collaboratory
- Abbreviation: HASTAC
- Pronunciation: /ˈhāˌstak/
- Formation: 2002
- Founder: Cathy N. Davidson, David Theo Goldberg
- Type: Virtual organization and platform
- Purpose: Fosters interdisciplinary collaboration across humanities, arts, science, and technology.
- Headquarters: The Graduate Center, CUNY and Dartmouth College
- Location: New York City, Hanover, United States
- Members: 18000+
- Key people: Cathy N. Davidson, David Theo Goldberg
- Main organ: HASTAC Scholars Program, HASTAC/MacArthur Foundation Digital Media and Learning Competition, Digital Publication Projects
- Publication: Digital Humanities@digitalculturebooks
- Funding: The Graduate Center, CUNY, Dartmouth College
- Website: www.hastac.org

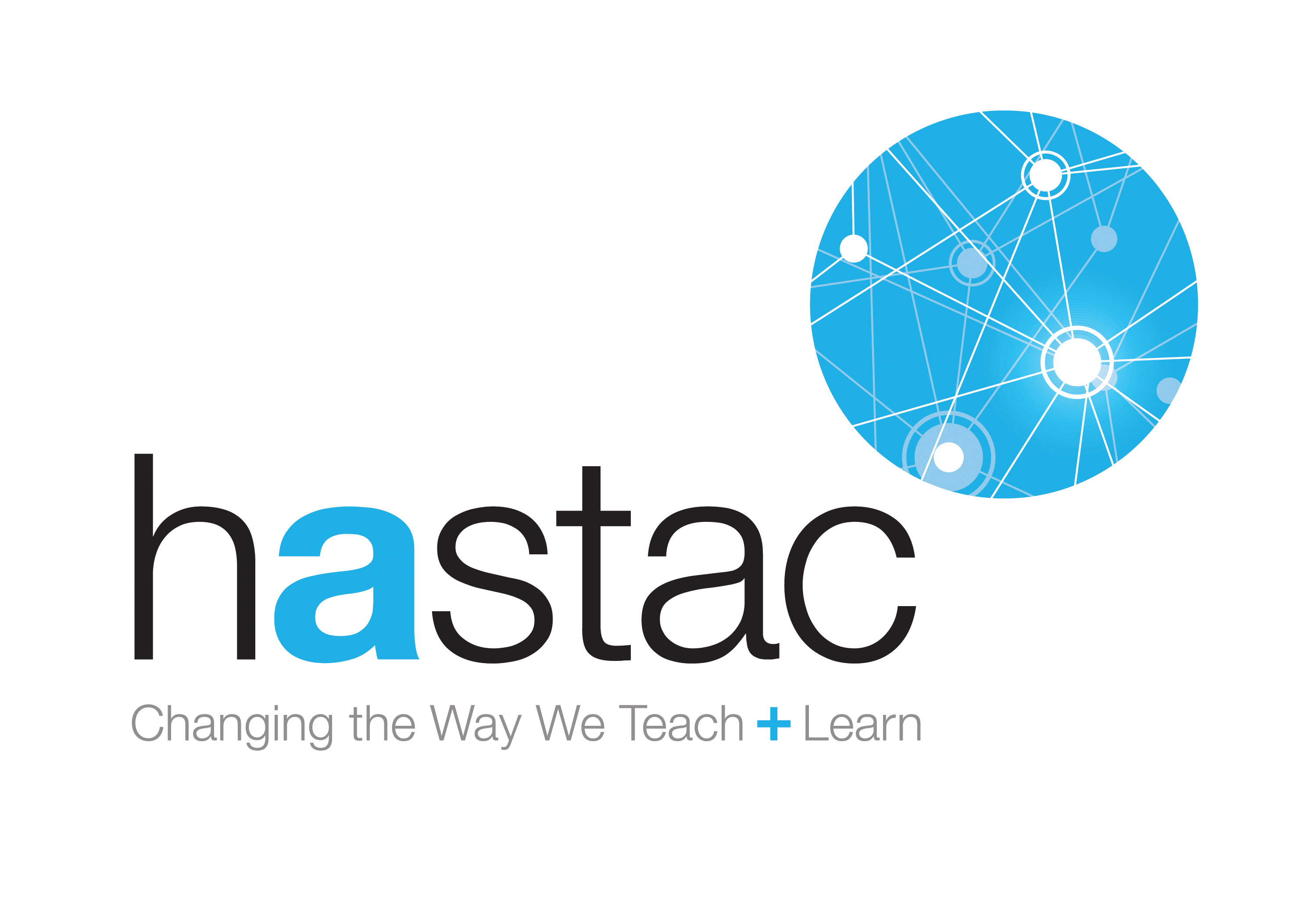
HASTAC logo

HASTAC (/ˈhāˌstak/), also known as the Humanities, Arts, Science and Technology Alliance and Collaboratory, is a virtual organization and platform comprising over 18,000 individuals and more than 400 affiliate institutions. Members of the HASTAC network actively contribute to the community through an open-access website, by organizing and participating in HASTAC conferences and workshops, and by collaborating with fellow network members.

Until 2016, HASTAC managed the annual $2 million MacArthur Foundation Digital Media and Learning Competition. The 2011 competition, titled “Badges for Lifelong Learning,” was launched in collaboration with the Mozilla Foundation and focused on the use of digital badges to motivate learning, recognize achievement, and validate the acquisition of knowledge or skills.

HASTAC has received funding from various institutions. As of 2021, HASTAC is jointly administered and funded by The Graduate Center, CUNY and Dartmouth College.

== Founding ==
HASTAC was founded in 2002 by Cathy N. Davidson, Ruth F. DeVarney Professor of English, John Hope Franklin Humanities Institute Professor of Interdisciplinary Studies and co-director of the PhD Lab in Digital Knowledge at Duke University and co-founder of the John Hope Franklin Humanities Institute at Duke University, and David Theo Goldberg, Director of the University of California's statewide Humanities Research Institute (UCHRI).

At a meeting of humanities leaders held by the Mellon Foundation in 2002, it was noted that Davidson and Goldberg had each, independently, been working on a variety of projects with scientists and engineers dedicated to expanding the uses of technology in research, teaching, and electronic publishing. They resolved to contact others who were building and analyzing the social and ethical dimensions of new technologies and soon formed the HASTAC.

Currently, HASTAC is governed by a Steering Committee of individuals from different institutions and disciplines.

== Programs ==
=== HASTAC Scholars program ===
In 2008, HASTAC initiated the HASTAC Scholars Program, an annual fellowship program that recognizes graduate and undergraduate students engaged in work across the areas of technology, the arts, the humanities, and the social sciences. As of 2021, over 1,800 people from 260 institutions have been named HASTAC Scholars.

=== HASTAC/MacArthur Foundation Digital Media and Learning Competition ===
Created in 2007, the HASTAC/MacArthur Foundation Digital Media and Learning Competition is designed to find and inspire the most uses of new media in support of connected learning. Awards have recognized individuals, for-profit companies, universities, and community organizations using new media to transform learning. Information about Digital Media and Learning Competition winners can be found on HASTAC.

=== Digital Publication Projects ===
Digital Publication Projects: Michigan Series in Digital Humanities@digitalculturebooks and the UM/HASTAC Digital Humanities Publication Prize The University of Michigan Press and HASTAC launched The University of Michigan Series in Digital Humanities@digitalculturebooks and the UM/HASTAC Digital Humanities Publication Prize in December 2009. Series editors include Julie Thompson Klein and Tara McPherson; advisory board includes Cathy N. Davidson, Daniel Herwitz, and Wendy Chun (Brown). Initial 2012 winners were Jentery Sayers and Sheila Brennan.

== Events ==
=== Conferences ===
HASTAC member organizations organize international conferences.

- Eight HASTAC member institutions coordinated InFORMATION Year in 2006–2007, a year of webcast programming each focusing on a theme for one month (InCommon, InCommunity, Interplay, Interaction, InJustice, Integration, Invitation and Innovation). All culminated in Electronic Techtonics an international Interface conference co-hosted by Duke University and RENCI (the Renaissance Computing Institute) on April 19–21, 2007. All events were webcast and archived versions are available free on hastac.org for nonprofit educational purposes.
- HASTAC II: Techno-Travels was held in 2008 at the University of California Humanities Research Institute (UCHRI); University of California, Irvine; and the University of California, Los Angeles.
- HASTAC III: Traversing Digital Boundaries was organized by the Institute for Computing in Humanities, Arts, and Social Science (I-CHASS) at the University of Illinois at Urbana-Champaign.
- HASTAC 2010: Grand Challenges and Global Innovations hosted by I-CHASS was a free, entirely virtual event held in a multiplicity of digital spaces instigated from sites across the globe.
- HASTAC 2011: Digital Scholarly Communication was held at the University of Michigan at Ann Arbor. (digital proceedings)
- HASTAC 2013: The Storm of Progress was held at York University and in downtown Toronto, Canada on April 25–28, 2013.
- HASTAC 2014: Hemispheric Pathways - Critical Makers in International Networks was hosted by the Peruvian Ministry of Culture held in Lima, Peru.
- HASTAC 2015: Exploring the Art & Science of Digital Humanities was held at the Kellogg Center of Michigan State University.
- HASTAC 2016: Impact, Variation, Innovation, Action was held at the Arizona State University's Nexus Lab in Tempe, AZ.
- HASTAC 2017: The Possible Worlds of Digital Humanities was held in Orlando, Florida. Sponsored and organized by the Florida Digital Humanities Consortium (FLDH.org)
- HASTAC 2019: Decolonizing Technologies, Reprogramming Education was held in partnership with the Institute for Critical Indigenous Studies at the University of British Columbia and the Department of English at the University of Victoria.
- HASTAC 2020: "Hindsight, Foresight, Insight" was planned to be led by Dean Anne Balsamo, and held at the University of Texas in Dallas, but due to COVID-19, has been cancelled.
- HASTAC 2023: Critical Making & Social Justice is scheduled to take place at Pratt Institute on June 8–10, 2023.

=== Mozilla's Drumbeat Festival: Learning, Freedom and the Open Web ===
HASTAC hosted the "Storming the Academy" tent, which discussed and workshopped open learning and peer-to-peer assessment strategies, ideas, and lessons, at the Mozilla Drumbeat Festival in Barcelona on Nov. 3–5, 2010.

=== THATCampRTP ===
On October 16, 2010, HASTAC hosted and helped to organize THATCamp RTP at Duke University's John Hope Franklin Humanities Institute. It was the first area THATCamp for the Research Triangle Park area of North Carolina.
