= Tina Wainscott =

American novelist

- Born: Naples, Florida
- Occupation: Novelist
- Writing career
- Period: 1995–present
- Genres: Romance, suspense
- Website: www.tinawainscott.com

Tina Wainscott (born Tina Ritter) is an American author of suspense novels and category romance novels.

== Biography ==
Tina Wainscott was born in Naples, Florida. She graduated from Lely High School in Naples in 1983 and studied business at Edison College. While attending college she often found herself daydreaming about stories, and eventually left school to devote herself to writing short stories. To enhance her skills, Wainscott attended night classes in creative writing. The creative writing classes helped Wainscott to become more focused, as she was expected to deliver new material in each session. Her third attempt at writing a novel won a prize in a Romance Writers of America competition in 1993, helping her to gain an agent. The manuscript, On the Way to Heaven, sold the following and was published in 1995. This paranormal romance was very popular, and within six months her publisher had released the sequel, Shades of Heaven.

As of 2007 she has published 17 novels, in the contemporary romance, paranormal romance, and suspense genres. Her 2007 novel Until the Day You Die is not considered a romance novel but is instead a psychological suspense novel. Her in-depth research allows her to create "a strong sense of place," which she pairs with "intriguing characters."

Wainscott has been nominated three times for Romantic Times Reviewers' Choice Awards, winning in 2000 for The Wrong Mr. Right. She has also been nominated for the Romantic Times Career Achievement Award.

Many of her novels are set in and around Naples, where Wainscott still lives with her husband, Dave Wainscott, a local architect, and daughter.

== Works ==
=== Novels ===
- On the Way to Heaven (1995)
- Shades of Heaven (1996)
- Dreams of You (1996)
- Second Time Around (1997)
- In a Heartbeat (1999)
- Trick of Light (2000)
- Back in Baby's Arms (2001)
- Unforgivable (2001)
- Now You See Me (2002)
- The Best Of Me (2002)
- I'll Be Watching You (2003)
- What She Doesn't Know (2004)
- I'd Kill for That (2004) (with Rita Mae Brown, Jennifer Crusie, Linda Fairstein, Lisa Gardner, Heather Graham, Kay Hooper, Katherine Neville, Anne Perry, Kathy Reichs, Julie Smith)
- In Too Deep (2005)
- Until the Day You Die (2007)

=== Omnibus ===
- The Wrong Mr Right / Never Say Never! (2000) (with Barbara Daly)
- Dan All Over Again / The Mountie Steals a Wife (2001) (with Barbara Dunlop)
- Driven to Distraction / Winging It (2002) (with Candy Halliday)
