= Cami Dalton =

American novelist

Cami Dalton is an American author of contemporary romance novels. Dalton's debut novel, Her Private Dancer, was published by Harlequin's Temptation line of category romances in April 2004. In a review of the novel, Romantic Times remarked on the "sizzling sensuality and strong writing" of Dalton's novel, while The Road to Romance described the book as having "an exciting storyline, endearing and charming characters, laugh out loud scenarios and pure romance from the heart." Dalton was a finalist for the 2004 Reviewers International Organization Award for Debut Romance and was nominated by Romantic Times BookReviews for Best First Series Romance.

Cami's second book, published by Harlequiin's Blaze line, is called Pleasure to the Max! and is set to be released on August 1, 2008. In early 2008, Cami signed a three-book deal with Harlequiin to follow up her first two books.
