= Media Arts and Practice =

Coordinates: 34.02400°N 118.27919°W

Created in 2013, Media Arts and Practice (MA+P) is the seventh degree-granting division of the USC School of Cinematic Arts.

== Degrees and Programs ==
The division offers two primary degree programs: a BA and a PhD in Media Arts + Practice. The PhD program, better known as iMAP, began accepting students in 2007. It is a practice-based PhD program in which students develop skills in both the theory and practice of media arts while doing doctoral level research that may be realized in an exclusively digital form. The degree was conceived by Anne Friedberg and Jen Stein with help from the program's founding director Steve F. Anderson. Other advisory faculty members include Holly Willis, Scott Fisher, Kathy Smith, Mary Sweeney, Tara McPherson, Mark Bolas, Aniko Imre, Henry Jenkins, Andreas Kratky and Norman Hollyn.

The BA in Media Arts + Practice, which began accepting students in 2013, is "an interdisciplinary storytelling program combining the study of contemporary digital media with hands-on production and research." Students learn to create media across several different platforms, such as video or interactive programming, while also studying the history and theory of media. The curriculum emphasizes the use of emerging technologies (such as virtual reality) to develop new narrative models. There is also an emphasis on media activism and social change.

The division also offers three undergraduate minors (Digital Studies, Future Cinema and Media and Social Change), an undergraduate honors designation (Honors in Multimedia Scholarship), and a graduate certificate program (Digital Media and Culture).

== Research ==
MA+P faculty and students actively participate in several arts-based research projects. Arts-based research is a practice by which artists and creative practitioners use their practical skillset as a method of developing original research questions and thereby contributing to the process of knowledge production. Arts-based research is unique in that it is not predetermined by desired end results; it borrows and combines many different research methodologies; and it often involves collaboration with professionals from other art and non-art fields.

Research labs at the USC School of Cinematic Arts include the Creative Media and Behavioral Health Center, the Game Innovation Lab, the Mobile and Environmental Media Lab, the Mixed Reality Lab, the Scalar Lab, the Transient Media Lab and the World Building Media Lab.
