= University of California Humanities Research Institute =

US research institute

The University of California Humanities Research Institute (UCHRI), is a humanities research institute at the University of California headquartered at the UC Irvine campus. It promotes collaboration and interdisciplinarity through supporting work by teams of researchers from varying fields both within and outside of the UC system. David Theo Goldberg served as Director, 2000-2022; Julia Reinhard Lupton served as Interim Director, 2022-2025; Jaimey Fisher is the current director, Oct. 2025-present.
