= Erik Loyer =

Erik Loyer is a digital artist whose work examines identity and memory in the context of new modes of communications afforded by media technologies.

== History ==
Loyer began his work at The Voyager Company, and has done professional interface design work for a number of firms and startups. He graduated with a degree in Cinema and Television from the University of Southern California.

== Projects ==
He won a 1998 New Media Invision Silver Award for his project The Lair of the Marrow Monkey, which is part of the permanent collection of the San Francisco Museum of Modern Art.

In 1999, he won a Rockefeller Media Fellowship for his ongoing interactive narrative Chroma which has been showcased internationally, as well as on the web.

In 2009 Loyer turned his attention to his startup company, Opertoon, specializing in the creation of "stories you can play" on mobile devices such as the iPad. Loyer's first release through Opertoon was Ruben & Lullaby, an Indiecade Official Selection valued by MSNBC as a "game that plays more like an interactive graphic novel." USA Today described Loyer's second Opertoon release and top-charting Apple iTunes Store app, "Strange Rain", as "part poetry, part artwork, part game, part interactive music experiment and part relaxation tool."

== See also ==
- Vectors Journal of Culture and Technology in a Dynamic Vernacular
