= Conservation and restoration of new media art =

Preservation of new media

The conservation and restoration of new media art is the study and practice of techniques for sustaining new media art created using from materials such as digital, biological, performative, and other variable media.

New media art runs a unique risk when it comes to longevity, which has resulted in the development of various new preservation and restoration strategies.

To preserve and restore these pieces of new media art, there are a variety of strategies including storage, migration, emulation, and reinterpretation. There are even more tools used to implement these strategies including Archivematica, BitCurator, Conifer, Media Info, PRONOM, QC Tools, and the Variable Media Questionnaire. The common metadata schema used for new media art is Media Art Notation System (MANS). Despite the name "new media art", there is a diverse history of preservation and restoration efforts including both individual efforts and consortium efforts.

== Preservation strategies ==
=== Storage ===
The acquisition and storage of the physical media-equipment, such as DVD players or computers, used in multi-media or digital artworks has proven a short-term tactic at best, as hardware can quickly become obsolete or can 'stale' in storage. Storage is also notoriously bad at capturing the contextual and live aspects of works such as Internet art, performance art and live electronic music.

Storage involves keeping documents in their original formats whenever possible to maintain authenticity; keeping metadata updated to aid in finding and understanding the preservation strategies taken so far; keeping documents on reliable, non-proprietary software that users would be the most likely to already have or easily get access to; storing multiple copies of bitstreams; replacing the carriers when new, more widely used ones become available.

=== Migration ===
To migrate a work of art is to upgrade its format from an aged medium to a more current one, such as from VHS to DVD, accepting that some changes in quality may occur while still maintaining the integrity of the original. This strategy assumes that preserving the content or information of an artwork, despite its change in media, trumps concerns over fidelity to the original look and feel.

Migration must take place regularly or the original piece may become obsolete with no way to update it to a newer format for accessibility. Migration is especially important when the file is saved on proprietary software like Microsoft Word, Prezi, Archives Space, etc. In the process of migration, a document can be stored in its original form and also migrated to a non-proprietary form in order to maintain authenticity while also providing long-term access.

=== Emulation ===
The process of simulating an older operating system (or by extension, other supporting infrastructure) on a newer software or hardware platform is called emulation. The idea behind emulation is to maintain the original format and feel of the piece of new media art. Emulation software allows users and researchers to view complex pieces of art like video games, virtual reality, etc. in a way that it was intended to be viewed. Emulation is especially important for art created on proprietary software or software that many users and researchers might not have access to. The emulation software allows them to view the document even without the original software.

==== Seeing Double: an emulation testbed ====
In 2004, the Guggenheim Museum, in conjunction with the Daniel Langlois Foundation, held an exhibition entitled Seeing Double: Emulation in Theory and Practice as a trial of emulation. In the exhibition, artworks operating on their original physical media were displayed alongside versions emulated on newer physical media. The exhibition was organized with the participation of computer researcher and emulation specialist, Jeff Rothenberg. In 1998, Rothenberg had published "Avoiding Technological Quicksand: Finding a Viable Technical Foundation for Digital Preservation".

=== Reinterpretation ===
Reinterpretation is the final storage form and is only considered when all other storage forms are not available. Reinterpretation involves changing the essence of the art with or without the artist's approval for preservation purposes. This could involve re-coding for access, recasting a piece in a more modern, durable medium, and more. This technique does not maintain authenticity the way the other strategies do, but it can be the most effective. Therefore, it is considered best practice to only use reinterpretation when all other strategies are deemed inappropriate.

== Preservation tools ==
Because the conservation and restoration of new media art is a craft, not a science, not every preservation strategy will work for every piece of new media art. Repositories have to make decisions based on the complexities of each individual piece. They will each have their own unique needs, interests, and priorities. Repositories and individual conservators keep up with new tools and technologies available to aid in preservation.

=== Archivematica ===
Archivematica is an "integrated suite of open source software tools". It allows repositories to store their documents there for the long-term while also keeping up to date with current industry standards such as Dublin Core, AIPs, etc. Repositories started using Archivematica to address the gap between storage and actual preservation. It helps them along with every step in archival processing.

=== Bit Curator ===
Bit Curator can be used as a way to examine a collection without going through each individual piece of art. Conservators can upload bulk files and Bit Curator will examine the trends and patterns. From there, repositories can decide what to focus on and which pieces need attention.

=== Conifer ===
Conifer creates an archive of any page you visit while you browse. It is useful for conservators because they do not have to collect the webpage materials themselves. Everything you see is archived. Unlike other web archives like Wayback Machine, Conifer captures images, video, etc. of pages that can only be seen by you. They capture material that is password protected. From there, conservators can go through the collection themselves to sort, arrange, describe, add metadata, etc.

=== Media Info ===
Media Info is primarily used for audio and visual files. They only take certain formats so more unconventional formats must be converted. This software verifies technical metadata and makes sure everything is working properly and up to date.

=== PRONOM ===
PRONOM is a resource for information on "file formats, software products, and other technical components". It helps to ensure the conservation and long-term access to a variety of documents. This information is marketed toward anyone interested in learning more. It is not exclusive to archivists and conservators.

=== QC Tools ===
QC Tools filters video files to help repositories analyze the contents of the video.

=== Variable Media Questionnaire ===
The Variable Media Questionnaire is a free web service that allows new media curators and repositories to share the most effective strategies of preservation for different forms of new media art. It focuses particularly on creating guidelines for preserving the art once the original medium or software is not available. They utilize the four main preservation strategies while recommending the specific mediums and software and work for different types of art.

== Involving artists in preservation ==
The future of new media conservation and restoration involves more collaboration between artists and curators. When preservation efforts are taken earlier in the creation of the work, future preservation becomes easier and more effective. The artist does not necessarily know the steps that must be taken to accurately preserve new media art and the curator does not necessarily know the artistic intentions of the creator. When these two work together throughout the creation and transfer to a repository, the conservation of the piece will last longer and the intentions of the artist will be honored. Without these efforts, many new media art pieces will not be properly preserved and will never be moved to a repository. The earlier the intervention, the easier it is going to be for the curator to ensure long-term preservation. Steps can be taken to make sure the new media art is around for future use. Those steps can involve the preservation strategies and tools described above, but the piece can only be preserved if it exists in a state where curators can access and modify it. For example, if it exists on a software that is already obsolete, it cannot be migrated.

== Metadata standards ==
=== Media Art Notation System (MANS) ===
The Media Art Notation System is a formal notation system introduced by Richard Rinehart, Digital Media Director and Adjunct Curator, Berkeley Art Museum/Pacific Film Archive, in 2007. It was developed in response to a need for a "new approach to conceptualizing digital and media art forms". Rinehart compares MANS to a musical score. An ensemble can change out the instruments, but it will still be the same piece of music as long as they follow the score. In the same way, digital media can be separated from its software and still produce the same computational result. When digital media is presented using a different hardware or software, it may appear slightly different, but it will still be the same piece of media art.

MANS uses XML to present the metadata specifically because it allows the coder to define the framework of the digital media while allowing for variations in how it presents itself. This is particularly useful for conservation because it allows future users to examine the document in a system that works for multiple different pieces of art. If the software or materials for one piece of art becomes obsolete, future researchers will be able to examine the new media art via XML and map it onto a newer schema.

MANS has three levels of implementation. The first level is Score which is mostly metadata with minimal XML. The second level is the machine-processable Score. It includes sub-component description, more XML, and even images and other media. The third level is the machine-processable Score that serves as a working model of the original. This level contains technical metadata, bitstreams, very granular description, and structural markup.

== Exhibiting new media art ==
New media art is unique from other types of art in that the tools and strategies used to create the art are often the same tools and strategies used to display or exhibit the art. Because of this, exhibiting new media art becomes a part of conserving new media art. Often, a curator or specialist will be on site at the exhibit to ensure the art is being displayed and used correctly by audiences. It would be easy to assume a computer is for administrative use when really the coding on the computer is part of the exhibit. This everchanging medium is difficult to conserve, restore, and exhibit.

Because of the innovative nature of new media art, it is very common for exhibits to include audience interaction. Artists will create work that is only fully complete during audience interaction such as movement, tactile pieces, or even changes made by audience members. This creates a unique challenge where only the initial artist-created portion of the piece can be conserved and the audience-interaction portion of the piece will change over time and depending on the actions of the audience members.

It is considered best practice when conserving or restoring new media art to consider the relationship with the audience. Often the aspect that sets new media art from other types of art is the "liveliness" that is represented by the relationship between the piece and the audience. In order to exhibit this type of art, curators and repositories must first accept this relationship as a type of art, and thus, worth exhibiting. Then, they will attempt to conserve the relationship built between the art and the audience.

== Relationship to other preservation efforts ==
The catchall term sometimes applied to such genres, variable media, suggests that it is possible to recapture the experience of these works independently of the specific physical material and equipment used to display them in a given exhibition or performance. As the nature of multi-media artworks calls for the development of new standards, techniques, and metadata within preservation strategies, the idea that certain artworks incorporating an array of media elements could be variable opens up the possibility for experimental standards of preservation and reinterpretation.

Nevertheless, many new media preservationists work to integrate new preservation strategies with existing documentation techniques and metadata standards. This effort is made in order to remain compatible with previous frameworks and models on how to archive, store and maintain variable media objects in a standardized repository utilizing a systematized vocabulary, such as the Open Archival Information System model.

While some of this research parallels and exploits progress made in the practice of Digital preservation and Web archiving, the preservation of new media art offers special challenges and opportunities. Whereas scientific data and legal records may be easily migrated from one platform to another without losing their essential function, artworks are often sensitive to the look and feel of the media in which they are embedded. On the other hand, artists who are invited to help imagine a long-term plan for their work often respond with creative solutions.

== History of new media art preservation ==
=== Individual efforts ===
Numerous contemporary art conservators have contributed individual efforts toward new media art preservation:

- Carol Stringari of the Solomon R. Guggenheim Museum in New York

As a deputy director and chief conservator, Stringari led laser research of a monochromatic painting by Ad Reinhardt and project on conservation of the works of László Moholy-Nagy. She later won the CAA/Heritage Preservation Award for Distinction for Scholarship and Conservation for her work on Ad Reinhardt's technique.

- Professor Pip Laurenson was formerly the Head of Time-Based Media Conservation at Tate Gallery in London where she ran the influential Andrew W. Mellon foundation supported programme Reshaping the Collectible: When Artworks Live in the Museum. Laurenson is currently head of the UK's first conservation programme dedicated to contemporary art and media, based at UCL East.
- Jill Sterret of the San Francisco Museum of Modern Art.

Director of Collections & Conservation at SFMOMA, Sterret is a collector and preserver of artworks made by contemporary artists. She works to the collaborations between artists, curators, technical experts, registrars, and conservators that support contemporary art conservation practice.

=== Consortium efforts ===
The variable media concept was developed in 1998, first as a creative strategy Ippolito brought to the adversarial collaborations produced with artists Janet Cohen and Keith Frank, and later as a preservation strategy called the Variable Media Initiative that he applied to endangered artworks in the Solomon R. Guggenheim Museum's collection. In 2002 the Guggenheim partnered with the Daniel Langlois Foundation for Art, Science and Technology in Montreal to form the Variable Media Network, a concerted effort to develop a museum-standard, best practice for the collection and preservation of new media art. Apart from Stringari and Ippolito, other key members of the Variable Media Network included Alain Depocas, Director of the Centre for Research and Documentation, Daniel Langlois Foundation; and Caitlin Jones, former Daniel Langlois Variable Media Preservation Fellow at the Guggenheim Museum.

Around this time similar investigations into the preservation of digital/media art were being led on the West Coast by Richard Rinehart, who published an article on the subject, "The Straw that Broke the Museum's Back? Collecting and Preserving Digital/Media Art for the Next Century", in 2000. Rinehart had also established Conceptual & Intermedia Arts Online (CIAO) with Franklin Furnace, the New York-based performance art-grants giving organization and archive/advocate of performance, 'ephemeral' or non-traditional art under the directorship of Martha Wilson.

Members of the Variable Media Network and CIAO subsequently joined forces with other organizations, including Rhizome.org, an affiliate of New York's New Museum of Contemporary Art, for collective preservation endeavors such as Archiving the Avant Garde. This broader coalition, operating under the rubric Forging the Future, is managed by the Still Water lab at the University of Maine and offers free, open-source tools for new media preservation, including the 3rd-generation Variable Media Questionnaire.

In 2002, Timothy Murray founded the Rose Goldsen Archive of New Media Art. Named after the pioneering critic of the commercialization of mass media, the late Professor Rose Goldsen of Cornell University. The Archive hosts international art work produced on CD-Rom, DVD-Rom, video, digital interfaces, and the internet. Its collection of supporting materials includes unpublished manuscripts and designs, catalogues, monographs, and resource guides to new media art. The curatorial vision emphasizes digital interfaces and artistic experimentation by international, independent artists. Designed as an experimental center of research and creativity, the Goldsen Archive includes materials by individual artists and collaborates on conceptual experimentation and archival strategies with international curatorial and fellowship projects.

Other important initiatives include DOCAM, an international research alliance on the documentation and the conservation of the media arts heritage organized by the Daniel Langlois Foundation, and the International Network for the Conservation of Contemporary Art (INCCA), organized by the Netherlands Institute for Cultural Heritage (ICN).

== See also ==
- Art conservation
- Digital preservation
- Digital art
- Internet art
- National Digital Library Program (NDLP)
- National Digital Information Infrastructure and Preservation Program (NDIIPP)
- New media art
- Virtual art
