= RESFest =

Defunct American film festival

- Location: United States
- Language: International

RESFEST (1996–2006) is a defunct American film festival. It was by the 2000s the most prominent digital film festival in North America.

== History ==
RESFest was a leading global showcase of new digital filmmakers alongside England's Onedotzero festival. The festival toured the world and in 2005 travelled to 35 cities in the USA, Canada, UK, Japan, Australia, Brazil and in various cities in Europe, Asia and Africa. A large part of the festival's latter content focused on cutting-edge music videos and short films, and directors like Michel Gondry, Spike Jonze, Chris Cunningham and Jonathan Glazer all had their catalogs of work showcased at RESFEST over its 10-year run.

The film festival was founded and directed by Jonathan Wells after the dissolution of the Low Res Digital Film Festival which he had previously co-founded.

Low Res Digital Film Festival first took place in October 1995 at an art gallery in San Francisco’s SoMa district. Founded by Wells and Bart Cheever, the first year’s program featured work from pioneering music video and motion graphics studio H-Gun Labs, England’s design collective Tomato, digital designer Nick Philip and filmmaker Spike Jonze, whose early skateboard short films were screened. The New York City screening in January 1996 featured work by Rox, Emergency Broadcast Network, and Sofia Coppola.

In 1997 the producers also created the digital film lifestyle magazine RES, which was affiliated with the online media site Sputnik 7. The original founders parted ways, with Cheever establishing a D.FILM festival and Wells championing RESFest.

Both the festival and magazine stopped updating their websites in the midst of RESFEST 10, the organization's 2006 tour, and have since been inactive.
