= Still Water (University of Maine) =

American laboratory

Still Water was a research and development laboratory at the New Media Department of the University of Maine that studied and built networks for artists, academics, and other creative professions. Still Water examined networking from technical, social, and political angles; specific areas of interest included online collaboration, indigenous sharing protocols, and limits placed on artistic remixes and filesharing by intellectual property law.

== Digital tools ==
Still Water has released social software intended to foster collaborative creation, distribution, and preservation of common culture. ThoughtMesh and The Pool are meant to connect digital scholars and creators, and have been described as incubators for artists and students that may serve as a means of evaluating academics working in new media.

Still Water is also the current development team for the Variable Media Questionnaire, a tool that tracks strategies for preserving ephemeral artworks and has been proposed as a means of resurrecting obsolescent artistic and scientific media. Still Water also helped create the Cross-Cultural Partnership, a legal instrument meant to encourage ethical behavior across cultural divides, as when electronic musicians want to sample Native American chants or when Wabanaki elders and permaculture activists live and work together in Still Water's LongGreenHouse project.

== Public events ==
Public events that Still Water has produced with these themes include the Code and Creativity conferences (2003–present) and Connected Knowledge conferences (2006–present). In 2004, Still Water co-organized the event Distributed Creativity with Eyebeam Atelier, which merged conversations during a six-week period from the email discussion lists Creative Commons (US), Rhizome.org (US), DATA (Ireland), Sarai (India), and Fibreculture (Australia).
