= Vectors (journal) =

- Discipline: Media studies
- Language: English

Publication details
- History: 2005–2007, 2012–2013
- Publisher: Open Humanities Press

Standard abbreviations
- ISO 4: Vectors

Indexing
- ISSN: 1944-7957

Links
- Journal homepage

Vectors: Journal of Culture and Technology in a Dynamic Vernacular was a peer-reviewed online academic journal published by the USC School of Cinematic Arts. It was established in March 2005 and covers the digital humanities, publishing work that "cannot exist in print". Vectors is recognized as an experimental precursor to the digital humanities, producing and publishing a range of highly interactive works of multimedia scholarship. Comparing Vectors with more traditional digital humanities publications, Patrick Svensson notes that, "Vectors, on the other hand, is clearly invested in the digital as an expressive medium in an experimental and creative way". The journal's last issue was published in 2013.

== Description ==
Five issues were produced between 2005 and 2007, each featuring six to eight works of original scholarship produced by the Vectors editorial and design staff in collaboration with a contributing scholar. After an hiatus of five years, publication resumed in 2012 and one issue each was published in 2012 and 2013. Published projects investigate diverse, interdisciplinary topics including evidence, indigenous communities, women's prisons, land use, war, and worker's rights. The journal states:

This investigation at the intersection of technology and culture is not simply thematic. Rather, Vectors is realized in multimedia, melding form and content to enact a second-order examination of the mediation of everyday life. Utilizing a peer-reviewed format and under the guidance of an international board, Vectors features submissions and specially-commissioned works comprised of moving- and still-images; voice, music, and sound; computational and interactive structures; social software; and much more.

Along with Kairos: A Journal of Rhetoric, Technology, and Pedagogy, Vectors is cited as an early effort to expand the forms of scholarly electronic publishing through, "multimodal texts, which make rich use of images, audio, video and other forms of computer-processed data, enabl[ing] authors to interact in new ways with their objects of study, and to create rich models of complex process and ideas." Vectors' focus on interaction design, database structures, and use of rich media was unusual in online academic publishing of its time, where text with pictures was often the norm. However, the Vectors model was based on the belief that, "[c]onceptualization is intimately tied in with implementation, design decisions often have theoretical consequences, algorithms embody reasoning, and navigation carries interpretive weight."
