= Csikszentmihalyi =

Csikszentmihalyi may refer to:

== People ==
- Mihaly Csikszentmihalyi, a social psychologist known for his work on happiness, creativity, and flow theory
- Christopher Csíkszentmihályi, an artist and technologist

== See also ==
- Csíkszentmihály, the Hungarian language name of Mihăileni, a commune in eastern Transylvania
