= Computing Culture Research Group =

Applied research group at the MIT Media Lab

The MIT Computing Culture Research Group was an applied research group at the MIT Media Lab founded and led by technologist and artist Christopher Csikszentmihályi, who also co-founded the MIT Center for Civic Media. Between 2000 and 2009, Computing Culture focused on "embedding poetic and political considerations in the development of new technologies." Its stated mission read in part:

To refigure what engineering means, how it happens, and what it produces. Drawing on fields from the humanities, like Science and technology studies, we create new technologies that function as instances of material power, but also as exemplars of what future goals engineering should pursue.

== Research and development ==
Computing Culture designed and built tools to comment on technology and its implications for social power dynamics, but also to function when applied. Tools produced within Computing Culture included, but are not limited to:

- Afghan eXplorer (Christopher Csikszentmihályi, 2001), a solar-powered, four-wheeled robot designed to report news from warzones.
- MarchToWar.com (Tad Hirsch, Ryan McKinley, 2003), a website devoted to wagers on when the United States' military would invade Iraq
- Government Information Awareness (Ryan McKinley, Christopher Csikszentmihályi, 2003), a crowdsourced website devoted to identifying connections among United States elected officials and lobbyists
- TXTMob (Tad Hirsch, Christopher Csikszentmihályi, Institute for Applied Autonomy, 2003), a SMS-messaging service for mass-protest coordination
- Blendie (Kelly Dobson, 2004), an interactive, intelligent, voice-controlled kitchen blender
- Freedom Flies (Christopher Csikszentmihályi, 2005), an Unmanned aerial vehicle designed to observe militia activity in the Southwestern United States
- Random Search (Ayah Bdeir, 2006), a wearable garment that tracks touch patterns during airport patdowns
- RoBoat (Christopher Csikszentmihályi, 2006), a robotic kayak designed to protest at island prisons
- Seeing Yellow (Benjamin Mako Hill, 2007), a campaign against computer printer manufacturers' practice of including traceable, invisible yellow dots on printouts

== Notable alumni ==
Computing Culture awarded degrees at the Master's and PhD level. Notable alumni include:

- Ayah Bdeir, founder and CEO of LittleBits
- Limor Fried, owner, Adafruit Industries
- Tad Hirsch, professor, University of Washington School of Art
- Benjamin Mako Hill, free software activist, hacker, and author
- Saoirse Higgins, practice-based research and lecturer, Orkney Islands
