= Christopher Csíkszentmihályi =

American artist and technologist

- Born: June 1968 (age 58); Chicago, Illinois, U.S.
- Education: School of the Art Institute of Chicago; University of California, San Diego
- Occupations: Artist, designer, professor
- Employer: Cornell University
- Father: Mihaly Csikszentmihalyi

Christopher Csíkszentmihályi (born June 1968) is an American artist and technologist. He is an associate professor of information science at Cornell University.

== Life ==
Csíkszentmihályi was born June 1968 in Chicago, Illinois. His father, Mihaly Csikszentmihalyi, was a psychologist who coined the concept of psychological flow. After leaving Reed College in 1988, Csíkszentmihályi earned a BFA from the School of the Art Institute of Chicago (SIAC) and an MFA from the University of California, San Diego (UCSD) in 1998.

== Academic career ==
Csíkszentmihályi is an associate professor in the Information Science department at Cornell University.

Csíkszentmihályi is the former director of the MIT Center for Future Civic Media and the Computing Culture research group at the MIT Media Lab. In addition to MIT and at Madeira Interactive Technologies Institute, he has served as Distinguished Visiting Professor of Art and Design Research at Parsons The New School for Design, was a 2005 Rockefeller New Media Fellow, a 2007–2008 fellow at Harvard's Radcliffe Institute for Advanced Study, and has taught at the University of California at San Diego, Rensselaer Polytechnic Institute, the Art Center College of Design, and Turku University.

== Work ==
Much of Csíkszentmihályi's art consists of working technologies of his own invention, which function as tools while also providing comment on technology and its implications for social power dynamics. These artwork/technologies include, but are not limited to:

- Hunter Hunter (1991), a free-standing robotic technology that could detect the sound of a gunshot and return fire, which was a precursor to applied Gunfire locator technologies
- DJ I, Robot (2000), a robotic disk jockey that could play and scratch vinyl records.
- Afghan eXplorer (2001), a solar-powered, four-wheeled robot designed to report news from warzones
- Freedom Flies (2005), an Unmanned aerial vehicle designed to observe militia activity in the Southwestern United States
- RoBoat (2006), a robotic kayak designed to protest at island prisons
- ProBot (2019), a tele-operated, human-sized robotic protester, designed to allow physical acts of protest while protecting one's personal safety

Other, more traditional artworks include 2005's Skin/Control, parallel installations that explore the tenuous nature of human influence over technology; and 2007's First Airborne, an installation consisting of hanging maple seedlings the size of the United States Air Force's Joint Direct Attack Munition bombs.

With Jude Mukundane, he is the co-founder of RootIO, a civic media project developing wide-reaching, small-scale, peer-oriented radio networks, currently operating in Uganda. By turning cell phones into standalone radio stations with village-sized catchment areas, RootIO provides a platform for localized media that requires little in terms of physical infrastructure and user literacy.

From 2001 to 2011, he was an associate professor at the MIT Media Lab, where he founded the Computing Culture Research Group, and, with Henry Jenkins and Mitchel Resnick, co-founded the Center for Civic Media, which he directed until 2011. From 2015 to 2020 he was Professor and European Research Area Chair of Human-Computer Interaction and Design Innovation at Madeira Interactive Technologies Institute.
