= Rankin and Taylor =

Rankin & Taylor
- Headquarters: 11 Park Place, Suite 914; New York, NY
- Major practice areas: Civil Rights, Criminal Defense
- Key people: David B. Rankin and Mark C. Taylor
- Date founded: 2008
- Website: Rankin & Taylor

Rankin & Taylor was a law practice that represented bicyclists in both civil and criminal cases. The firm's founding partners were cyclists.

== History ==
The firm was founded in 2008 by attorneys David B. Rankin and Mark C. Taylor, who were passionate about bicycling.

Taylor left the firm in 2016 to practice housing law at Legal Services NYC. Rankin practices civil rights and general law at Beldock, Levine & Hoffman LLP, which merged with Rankin and Taylor.

== Cases ==
The firm represented Tad Hirsch, creator of the TXTMob messaging service. Protestors used TXTmob to organize events during the 2004 Republican National Convention. When the New York City Law Department subpoenaed Hirsch's TXTmob records, Rankin argued that the subpoena was "vague" and "overbroad." They claimed that disclosing the information about TXTmob users who had nothing to do with lawsuits would violate their First Amendment and privacy rights.

In 2010, the firm represented Said Hajem in a discrimination lawsuit against the NYPD. The firm argued that the NYPD's refusal to hire Hajem, despite his high scores on the police entrance exam was discrimination.

In 2011, the firm represented Sojourner Hardeman in a federal civil rights lawsuit against the NYPD. Hardeman had been arrested numerous times for panhandling on Fifth Avenue. The firm argued that the arrests for disorderly conduct were without probable cause, and violated Hardeman's constitutional rights. In a judge-approved stipulation, the NYPD agreed not to arrest her without probable cause.

The firm also represented client in police misconduct lawsuits against the NYPD.

== Freedom of Information law ==
The firm has represented clients in Freedom of Information Law litigation, and represented clients seeking information about the closure of Chase Plaza in downtown Manhattan, a formerly public space. The firm also worked to both unseal the names and records of bodies buried in New York City's Hart Island, and to increase access to the graves.
