= William Damon =

American psychologist (born 1944)

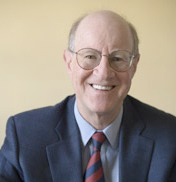
- Born: 1944 (age 81–82); Brockton, Massachusetts, U.S.
- Education: Harvard University (BA); University of California, Berkeley (PhD)
- Known for: Writings on moral commitment, purpose
- Children: 3
- Scientific career
- Fields: Psychology
- Workplaces: Clark University; Brown University; Stanford University; Hoover Institution

William Damon (born 1944) is an American psychologist who is a professor emeritus at Stanford University and a retired senior fellow at Stanford University's Hoover Institution. He is one of the world's leading scholars of human development. Damon has done pioneering research on the development of purpose in life and wrote the influential book The Path to Purpose. Damon writes on intellectual and social development through the lifespan and has contributed to applied fields such as entrepreneurship education and philanthropic strategy. Damon has been elected to the National Academy of Education and the American Academy of Arts and Sciences.

== Early life and education ==
Damon grew up in Brockton, Massachusetts and attended public schools there. His mother Helen was a shoe designer. His father Philip served in the army during World War II and did not return from the war. Damon moved in with his mother's uncle Louis, who helped raise him and sent him to college. He attended Phillips Academy Andover for high school.

After college, Damon received a doctorate in psychology at the University of California, Berkeley. He then joined the psychology faculty at Clark University as an assistant professor. In the 1990s he was University Professor at Brown University, where he founded the Center for the Study of Human Development.

== Research and writing career ==
Damon is the author of 20 books and numerous book chapters and articles on psychology and human development. His work has been influential for research and theory in academic developmental psychology. Damon’s editorship of the 5th and 6th editions of the Handbook of Child Psychology places him–along with Carl Murchison, Leonard Carmichael, and Paul Mussen–as one of the great organizers and synthesizers of developmental science. As part of Damon’s commitment to the study of human growth, he also was the founder and long-term editor of the series New Directions for Child and Adolescent Development.

By the time Damon captured the attention of the popular press with his book The Moral Child: Nurturing Children’s Natural Moral Growth (1990), he had written and edited seven scholarly books on the social and moral development of children. His early works include The Social World of the Child (1977), and Social and Personality Development: Infancy through Adolescence (1983). These studies focused on how the conduct of children and adolescents plays out in real social situations. Damon emphasized that thinking and behavior develop in dynamic relationship with family, peers, teachers, and the larger social world. Moral emotions (such as empathy, shame, and guilt) and the principles of distributive justice (which can be seen in sharing) flourish, or may be smothered, within these relationships.

The Moral Child marked a shift in Damon’s scholarship. The book surveyed and synthesized the large, complex body of research on moral development and translated it for the general public. In addition to bringing him a new audience, the book articulated the implications of the best research for educational practice and childrearing and family relations.

In 1995, Damon gained an even larger popular audience with his book, Greater Expectations: Overcoming the Culture of Indulgence in Our Homes and Schools (1995), which won the Parents' Choice Award for books and was the subject of wide media coverage. The book proposed that prevailing child-rearing beliefs and practices are not leading to morally mature or competent young people. Damon argued that, “with best intentions,” parents and schools have been in large part responsible for this situation: our culture's unwavering focus on self-esteem and child-centered practices are misguided and reflect a misunderstanding of “the nature of children and their developmental needs. . . .All the commonly accepted standards for young people’s skills and behavior have fallen drastically. Less is expected of the young, and in turn less is received.” To build character and competence requires high standards and expectations. The book received praise from reviewers who agreed with Damon's emphasis on high standards for achievement and service. The book received criticism from some educators who believed that children need more attention and creative freedom to grow rather than, as Damon wrote, the encouragement to take on hard challenges and to develop internal discipline and good habits.

Another important focus in Damon’s work has been his study of moral exemplars. His first book on this subject, Some Do Care: Contemporary Lives of Moral Commitment (1992), written with psychologist Anne Colby, introduced a new method of "exemplar research" to the study of human development and has been widely cited and built upon in the field. Damon and Colby studied individuals who had shown “a sustained commitment to moral ideals or principles” over many decades of their lives. The authors found a number of qualities that were consistent across the entire group of exemplars, including a sense of certainty about their core moral beliefs, a positive attitude toward hardship and challenge, receptivity toward new ideas and goals, a lifelong capacity for moral growth, and a strong integration of their moral values into their sense of self. This book promoted the "moral identity" theory, which maintains that moral commitment and moral action are a function of how important morality is to a person's sense of self. This theory adds an additional dimension to theories that emphasize the primary importance of moral reasoning skills (Lawrence Kohlberg), emotions (Jonathan Haidt), or cultural background (Richard Shweder). Jonathan Haidt has said of Damon that he “has long been the expert I most trust on moral development.” Damon's work also is known for its case study and interview methodology, which some believe to be more evocative than experimental studies. Damon and Colby followed up their Some Do Care study of living moral exemplars with some historical case studies of 20th century moral exemplars, described in their 2015 book The Power of Ideals.

Damon's developmental research has been aimed at promoting "the character and competence of all young people growing up in today’s world . . . [to provide] guidance for parenting, for improved educational practice, and for youth development in a wide variety of community settings.” One study examined young people who exhibit a striking sense of purpose. This research has been expanded in the works of Kendall Cotton Bronk and Jenni Menon Mariano. In addition, Damon's youth purpose work is closely connected with the "positive youth development" approach pioneered by Peter L. Benson.

In a series of studies with Howard Gardner and Mihaly Csikszentmihalyi, Damon examined purposeful work in several professional and business settings. Damon wrote about journalism in the book Good Work: When Excellence and Ethics Meet and about business success in The Moral Advantage. Damon presented his framework for good work in philanthropy in Taking Philanthropy Seriously: Beyond Noble Intentions to Responsible Giving.

Damon's book The Path to Purpose was the result of Damon's twenty-five-year research program on personal identity and character in human development. The book has been widely cited as the first scientific treatment of how young people find fulfilling purposes in life. The Path to Purpose presents Damon's vision of how schools and parents can help young people find elevated goals to dedicate themselves to, and it contains a critique of prevalent "short-horizons thinking" in today's culture that fosters cynicism and anxiety rather than inspiration, optimism, and faith.

In 2021, Damon published A Round of Golf with my Father: The New Psychology of Exploring your Past to Make Peace with your Present. The book describes Damon's discovery of what happened to his father after World War II, when he did not return home to Damon and his mother. In the book, Damon discusses the benefits of unravelling family secrets, of coming to terms with past regrets, and of renewing self-identity in a forward-looking and purposeful manner. All of this is done in the context of a "life review," a method of systematically examining one's past, and the lives of one's ancestors, to forge a positive present identity. The book concludes with an imaginary round of golf between Damon and his deceased father, an experience that Damon finds emotionally satisfying and redemptive.

== Personal life ==
Damon is married with three children, Jesse, Maria, and Caroline. He has a granddaughter Sarah, a grandson Isak, and a granddaughter Dorothy.

== Reviews ==
Jonathan Yardley of the Washington Post called Damon's book Greater Expectations "A voice of common sense...forthright, clearheaded and courageous."(full review) The book won a 1996 Parents' Choice Award for books. Damon's book, The Path to Purpose: How Young People Find Their Calling in Life, has received widespread attention. The Library Journal wrote "This brilliant, involving investigation of the 'failure to launch' phenomenon is essential reading for anyone involved in educating, counseling, and directing today's youth." Dawn Friedman of Greater Good magazine of the Greater Good Science Center, said, "The book's important message is often lost in dense, academic language, but it still shines through real-world examples.(full review)" Parker J. Palmer wrote, "Every thoughtful adult I know is concerned that many American youth seem to lack a sense of purpose in their lives. Here is an important book that can help us move beyond concern to insight, public discourse, and action. In The Path to Purpose: How Young People Find Their Calling in Life, Bill Damon examines one of the most important personal and social issues of our time, and does so with a rare mix of sound data, compelling theory, practical recommendations and engaging prose. This is a must-read for parents, teachers, religious leaders, and anyone who cares about the fate of the rising generation."

About Damon's 2021 book A Round of Golf with my Father, Vartan Gregorian, President of the Carnegie Corporation of New York, wrote "William Damon, a noted scholar and author of The Path to Purpose, has written a fascinating book...For some six decades, Bill believed that his father was ‘missing in action’ during WWII. His late-in-life discovery that his father had been alive but absent unleashed a psychological crisis. Bill’s autobiographical account is original, candid, and poignant, full of irony and humor. This splendid, rich volume tells the story of coming to terms with one’s past to face the present and demonstrates the redemptive, reinvigorating power of looking back on one’s life.” Michael Murphy (golf author) wrote "(a) gripping detective story, a deeply touching personal memoir, a critique of developmental psychology, a compendium of life-giving maxims, and a celebration of disciplined life review. Once I started reading it, I had trouble putting it down." (more praise here)

== Books ==
- Damon, W. (2021). A Round of Golf with my Father: The New Psychology of Exploring your Past to Make Peace with your Present. West Conshohocken PA: Templeton Press. ISBN 978-1-59947-563-9
- Damon, W., and Colby, A. (2015) The Power of Ideals: The Real Story of Moral Choice. New York: Oxford University Press. ISBN 978-0-19935-774-1
- Damon, W. (2011) Failing Liberty 101: How We Are Leaving Young Americans Unprepared for Citizenship in a Free Society. Stanford, CA: Hoover Institution Press. ISBN 978-0-81791-364-9
- Damon, W. (2008) The Path to Purpose: How Young People Find their Calling in Life. New York: The Free Press. ISBN 978-1-41653-723-6
- Damon, W., and Verducci, S. (2006) Taking Philanthropy Seriously: Beyond Noble Intentions to Responsible Giving. Bloomington, IN: Indiana University Press. ISBN 978-0-25321-860-5
- Damon, W. (2004) The Moral Advantage. San Francisco: Berrett-Koehler. ISBN 978-1-57675-206-7
- Damon, W. (2003) Noble Purpose. Radnor, PA: Templeton Foundation Press ISBN 978-1-93203-154-6
- Gardner, H., Csikszentmihalyi, M., and Damon, W. (2001) Good Work: When excellence and ethics meet. New York: Basic Books. (German, Spanish, Chinese, Portuguese, Romanian translations, 2001–2005). ISBN 978-046502-608-1
- Damon, W. (1997) The Youth Charter: How communities can work together to raise standards for all our children. New York: The Free Press. ISBN 978-046502-608-1
- Damon, W. (1995) Greater Expectations: Overcoming the culture of indulgence in our homes and schools. New York: The Free Press. ISBN 978-046502-608-1 (Italian, Japanese translations, 1997–1999)
- Colby, A., and Damon, W. (1992) Some Do Care: Contemporary lives of moral commitment. New York: The Free Press. ISBN 978-0-02906-355-2
- Damon, W. (1990) The Moral Child: Nurturing children's natural moral growth. New York: The Free Press. ISBN 978-0-02906-933-2 (Italian, Japanese, German, Chinese, Polish, Korean, Danish translations, 1995–2004).
- Damon, W., and Hart, D. (1988) Self-understanding in Childhood and Adolescence. New York: Cambridge University Press. ISBN 978-0-52130-791-8
- Damon, W. (1983). Social and Personality Development: Infancy through adolescence. New York: W. W. Norton. ISBN 978-0-39301-742-7 (German translation, 1988; Japanese translation, 1990; Chinese translation, 1992)
- Damon, W. (Ed.) (1983). Social and Personality Development: Essays on the growth of the child. New York: W. W. Norton. ISBN 9-78-039395-307-7
- Damon, W. (1977). The Social World of the Child. San Francisco: Jossey-Bass. ISBN 978-0-87589-339-6 (German translation, 1983; Japanese translation, 1988)

== Edited collections ==
- Damon, W., and Lerner, R. (Eds.) (2006) Handbook of Child Psychology: The sixth edition (volumes 1–4). New York: John Wiley and Sons.
- Damon, W. (Ed) (2002) Bringing in a New Era in Character Education. Stanford, CA: Hoover Institution Press.
- Damon, W. (Ed.) (1998) Handbook of Child Psychology: The fifth edition (volumes 1–4). New York: John Wiley and Sons.
- Damon, W. (Ed.) (1989) Child Development Today and Tomorrow. San Francisco: Jossey-Bass.
- Damon, W. (Ed.) (1978). Social Cognition. San Francisco: Jossey-Bass.
- Damon, W. (Ed.) (1978). Moral Development. San Francisco: Jossey-Bass.
