= Work as play =

Philosophical concept

Work as play is the concept of a qualitative change in human work activity. An idea does not have a single author, but is present in studies and culture.

Work is usually perceived as an external obligation and play as an internal compulsion. Consequently, turning work into play is seen as the solution to the alienation of labor. Nowadays, play is increasingly integrated into human labor activities. This approach is called gamification as applied to work.

== Anarchism ==
American anarchist Bob Black, in his essay The Abolition of Work called for the complete abolition of labor. The method of achieving this goal is "turning work into play".

== Psychology ==
According to Mihaly Csikszentmihalyi, a broad understanding of what constitutes a game can include work. In addition, the factors for achieving a flow state desirable for labor activity are obvious characteristic of a game situation.

A 2019 study showed that those who view their content creation as work had the highest levels of activity and income. At the same time, those who associated it with play, earned more income than those content creators who regard their content creation equally as play and work.

== See also ==
- Critique of work
- Motivation § Intrinsic and extrinsic
- Playbor
- Post-work society
- Serious game
- Serious play
- Work–life interface
