= Peter Benson =

Peter Benson may refer to:

- Peter Benson (author) (born 1956), British novelist
- Peter Benson (actor) (1943–2018), British actor known for his role in the TV series Heartbeat
- Peter Benson (rugby league) (born 1967), Australian rugby league footballer of the 1980s and 1990s
- Peter Benson (architect) (c.1570–1642), English-born builder and architect
- Peter L. Benson (1946–2011), American psychologist

== See also ==
- Peter Benenson (1921–2005), founder of Amnesty International
