= Center for Civic Media =

Research institute at Massachusetts Institute of Technology

The MIT Center for Civic Media (formerly the Center for Future Civic Media) was a research and practical center that developed and implemented tools that supported political action and "the information needs of [civic] communities". Its mission read in part:

The MIT Center for Civic Media creates and deploys technical and social tools that fill the information needs of communities.

We are inventors of new technologies that support and foster civic media and political action; we are a hub for the study of these technologies; and we coordinate community-based test beds both in the United States and internationally.

At the end of August, 2020, the Center for Civic Media closed down.

== History ==
The Center for Civic Media was founded in 2007 as a joint effort of the MIT Media Lab and the MIT Comparative Media Studies program. Its initial funding, a four-year grant from the Knight Foundation, was won in a contest "to foster blogs and other digital efforts that seek to bring together residents of a city or town in ways that local newspapers historically have done." The founders planned to "develop new technologies and practices to help newspapers attract readers as a greater number of Americans use the Internet as their primary news source." It expanded in 2011.

Staffed by academic, technical, and professional staff, the Center was originally led by Christopher Csikszentmihályi, along with the Media Lab's Mitchel Resnick and Comparative Media Studies' Henry Jenkins. Ethan Zuckerman was announced as the Center's new director in June 2011. Others affiliated with the center include Sasha Costanza-Chock, Benjamin Mako Hill, William Uricchio, Jing Wang, Joy Buolamwini, Catherine D'Ignazio and Jeffrey Warren.

In August, 2019, Zuckerman announced his intention to leave MIT, motivated by the Media Lab's ties to Jeffrey Epstein. The Center for Civic Media closed down at the end of August, 2020.

== Research and development ==
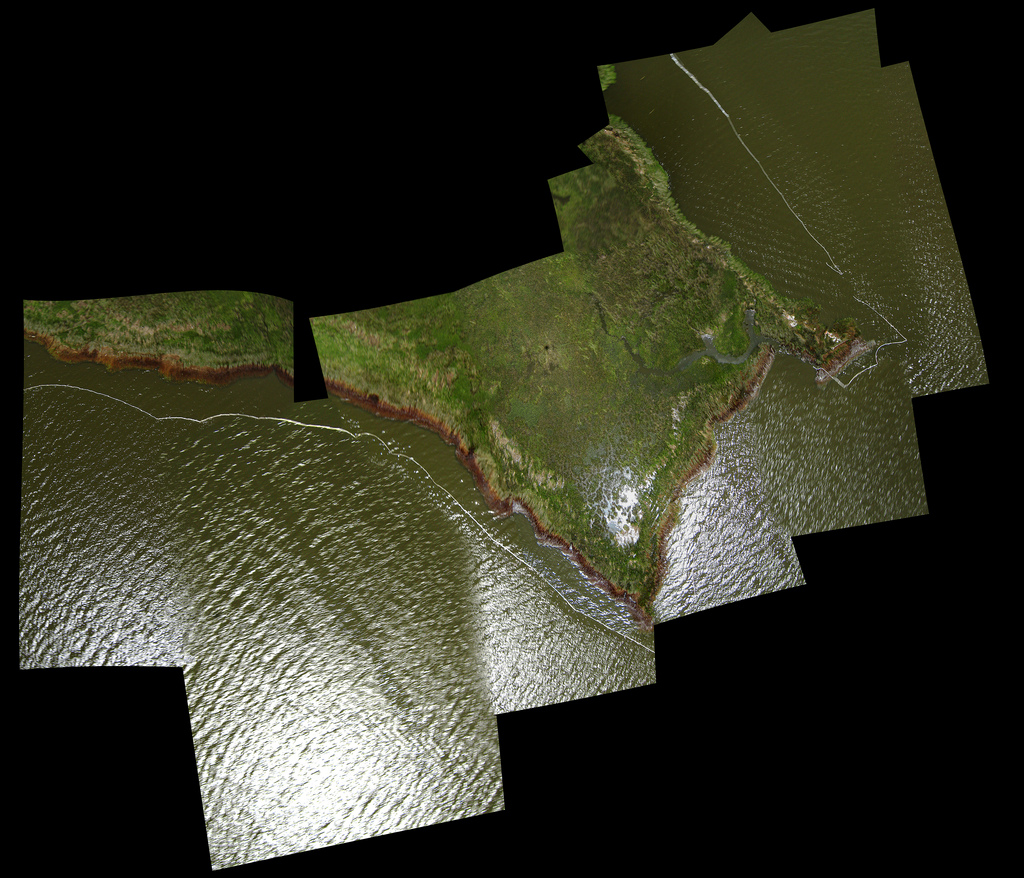
An example of Grassroots Mapping's balloon-and-camera imagery, taken in the Gulf of Mexico immediately after the B.P. Oil Spill.

The Center creates tools for deployment and testing in geographic communities. Like the Media Lab, the work is iterative, experimental, and draws in large part on the work of current graduate students. But unlike much other work at the Media Lab, Center tools are expected to have immediate applications, even if narrowly focused on a specific community's need.

With varying levels of adoption, deployed civic media tools and communities have included:

- Grassroots Mapping (Gulf of Mexico oil spill; the Gowanus Canal, Brooklyn, Superfund site), a collection of cartographic tools and practices—such as best practices for using balloons, kites, inexpensive cameras, and open-source software—for citizens to produce their own aerial imagery. Grassroots Mapping grew into the larger Public Lab, which won a $500,000 Knight News Challenge grant for its work.
- Lost in Boston: Realtime (Boston, MA; South Wood County, WI, under the name Sameboat), displays local information in shared areas at low cost, such as using LED screens to display live bus arrival data in places people prefer to be, such as stores or coffeeshops near bus stops rather than at bus stops themselves.
- Sourcemap, which maps supply chains of consumer goods.
- Between the Bars, a blogging platform for prisoners
- Crónicas de Héroes/Hero Reports, a method for reporting small acts of civic heroism. (Utilized in Juárez, Mexico, and elsewhere)
- People's Bot (telepresence robot)
