= University of Madeira =

Portuguese public university

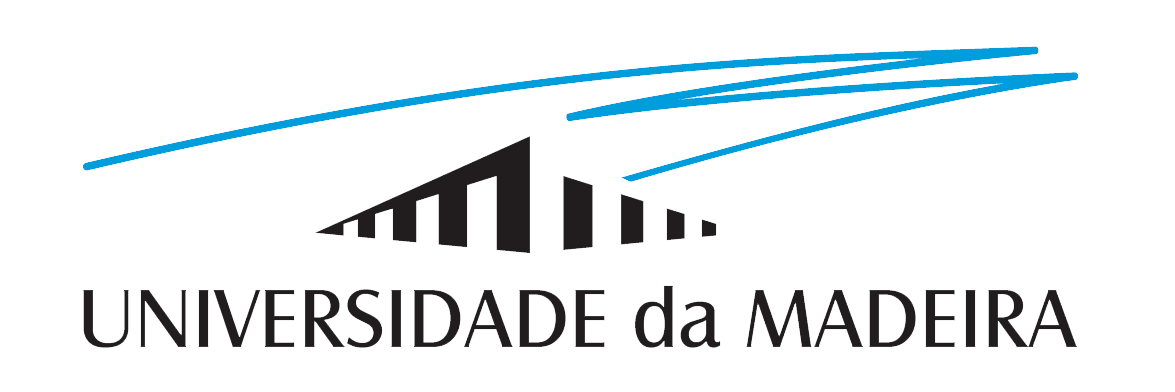
- Other names: UMa
- Type: Public
- Established: September 1988
- Rector: José Manuel Cunha Leal Molarinho Carmo
- Location: Funchal, Madeira; 32°39′32″N 16°55′28″W
- Website: www.uma.pt

The University of Madeira (UMa; Portuguese: Universidade da Madeira, pronounced [univɨɾsiˈðaðɨ ðɐ mɐˈðɐjɾɐ]) is a Portuguese public university, created in 1988 in Funchal, Madeira. The university offers first, second cycle and Doctorate academic degrees in a wide range of fields, in accordance with the Bologna process. It is now under the CMU/Portugal agreement with Carnegie Mellon University, having master programme in Computer Engineering, Human Computer Interaction and Entertainment Technology. Students admitted will be eligible for scholarships and have internship opportunity during the summer break. In addition, Madeira Interactive Technologies Institute, founded in January 2010, is devoted to building international partnership with other educational institutes and industry.

== History ==
The university's campus dates back to a 16th-century Jesuit college. Its first higher education institution, a medical school, was founded in Funchal in the 18th century. In 1978, the University of Lisbon established a satellite campus in Madeira, and from 1983 to 1986, today's campus began taking shape, offering courses in the areas of science and technology, arts, humanities, and social sciences. In 1985, the campus integrated a polytechnic school of nursing (Escola Superior de Enfermagem); in 1989, a polytechnic school of education (Escola Superior de Educação da Madeira). In 1996, the Portuguese government and the University of Lisbon formally established the University of Madeira as an independent institution. In 2008, the university celebrated its 20-year anniversary.

== University of Madeira today ==
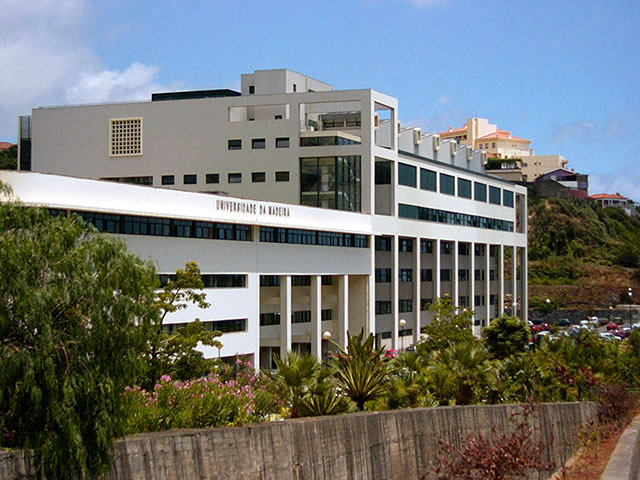
The exterior of the Penteada Campus of the university

Today, undergraduate and graduate students choose from a wide range of programs across several departments, including art and design, biology, Medicine, physical education & sports, English, German studies, romanic studies, physics, management and economics, mathematics and engineering, psychology and humanistic studies, chemistry, and a nursing school. Specific programs include art and multimedia, communication culture and organizations, and the educational sciences.

== Student life ==
The Academic Association of UMa (AAUMA) provides an array of extracurricular activities for university students throughout the year. Past AAUMA sponsored events have included film screenings, Sports Gala, boating trips, and volunteer opportunities. In addition, representatives from each student association serve on the Advisory Council, affording students an active role in the growth of the university and its relationship with the surrounding community.

Students who wish to explore Funchal will find a modern city of about 100,000 inhabitants. Its harbor and climate, combined with an attractive geographical position, have allowed Funchal to have a rapid population growth. The island is noted for its wine production, along with its exotic flowers, tropical fruits, and New Year's Eve celebrations with a spectacular fireworks show, considered the biggest in the world.

== Partnership with Carnegie Mellon ==
In 2007, Madeira's Mathematics and Engineering Department, along with Carnegie Mellon's Human Computer Interaction Institute (HCII) established a dual-degree Master's in Human-Computer Interaction program. In the program, students study computer science, design, psychology, and social and decision sciences. Students enrolled in the partnership program study in Madeira and at Carnegie Mellon's Pittsburgh campus, earning master's degrees from both universities.

== Faculties ==
University of Madeira consists of the following faculties:

- Faculty of Arts and Humanities
- Faculty of Exact Sciences and Engineering
- Faculty of Social Sciences
- Faculty of Life Sciences
- School of Health Sciences
- School of Technology and Management

== Specialized units and research projects ==
In addition to the above-mentioned faculties, UMa consists of several research and specialization units.

Public funded Research Groups

- Chemistry Centre of Madeira
- Madeira Interactive Technologies Institute (M-ITI)
- Molecular Materials Research Group
- Centre for Research in Education

Integrated in Public funded Research Groups

- Centre of Applied Economics Studies of the Atlantic
- Research Centre for Mathematics and Applications
- Research Centre in Sports Science, Health and Human Development
- Research Centre for Health Technology and Services
- Low-Temperature Plasma Physics Research Group

Other Research Groups

- ISOPlexis Genebank
- Research Centre for Regional and Local Studies
- Centre for Portuguese and European Literatures and Cultures
- Astronomy Group at the University of Madeira
- Madeira Botanical Group
- Human Genetics Lab

== See also ==
- List of universities in Portugal
- Higher education in Portugal
- Madeira Interactive Technologies Institute (M-ITI)
