= Howard Gardner =

American developmental psychologist (born 1943)

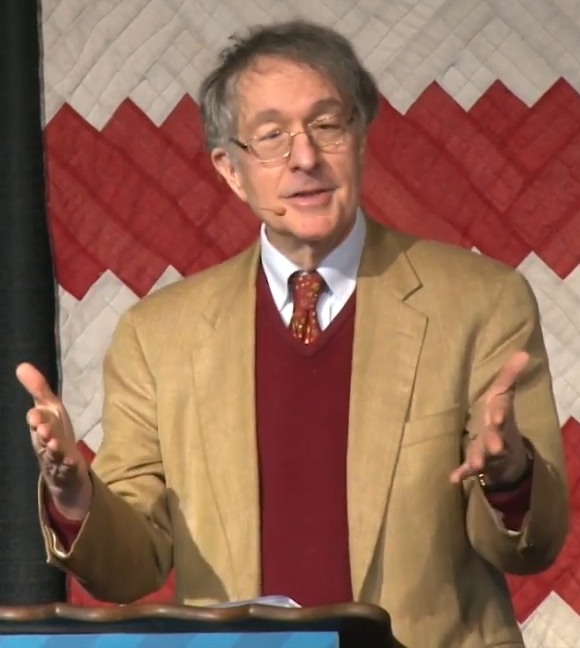
- Gardner in 2013
- Born: Howard Earl Gardner; July 11, 1943 (age 83); Scranton, Pennsylvania, U.S.
- Education: Harvard University (BA, PhD); London School of Economics
- Known for: Theory of multiple intelligences
- Spouse: Ellen Winner
- Scientific career
- Fields: Developmental psychology
- Workplaces: Harvard University
- Website: www.howardgardner.com

Howard Earl Gardner (born July 11, 1943) is an American developmental psychologist and the John H. and Elisabeth A. Hobbs Research Professor of Cognition and Education at Harvard University. He was a founding member of Harvard Project Zero in 1967 and held leadership roles at that research center from 1972 to 2023. Since 1995, he has been the co-director of The Good Project.

Gardner has written hundreds of research articles and over thirty books that have been translated into over thirty languages. He is best known for his theory of multiple intelligences, as outlined in his 1983 book Frames of Mind: The Theory of Multiple Intelligences.

Gardner retired from teaching in 2019. In 2020, he published his intellectual memoir A Synthesizing Mind. He continues his research and writing, including several blogs.

== Early life and education ==
Howard Earl Gardner was born July 11, 1943, in Scranton, Pennsylvania, to Ralph Gardner and Hilde (née Weilheimer) Gardner, German-Jewish immigrants who fled Germany in 1938 just prior to World War II.

Gardner described himself as "a studious child who gained much pleasure from playing the piano". He taught piano intermittently from 1958 to 1969.

Howard Gardner had a brother named Eric who died at age seven in a sledding accident just before Howard's birth. Gardner often reflects on his childhood, his overall Jewish values and the tragic loss of his brother, whom he never got the opportunity to meet. As a young child Gardner enjoyed reading and playing the piano.

While his parents had hoped that he would attend Phillips Academy in Andover, Massachusetts, Gardner opted to attend Wyoming Seminary, a college-preparatory school that was closer to his hometown in Pennsylvania.

Gardner then attended Harvard College, where he studied under the renowned psychoanalyst Erik Erikson. He graduated with highest honors in 1965, with a B.A. in Social Relations. After spending one year at the London School of Economics, where he studied philosophy and sociology, he went on to obtain his Ph.D. in developmental psychology at Harvard, working with psychologists Roger Brown and Jerome Bruner, and philosopher Nelson Goodman.

Gardner also worked at Boston University's Aphasia Research Center, where he completed a postdoctoral fellowship from 1971-1972, working with neurologist Norman Geschwind. He continued his work there for another 20 years.

== Career ==
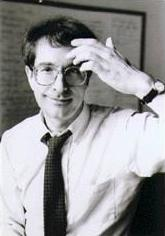
Gardner in his earlier years

In 1986, Gardner became a professor at the Harvard Graduate School of Education. He has been the Chair of the Project Zero Steering Committee since 1995, and was the Co- Director for Project Zero from 1972- 2000. Gardner has also been Senior Director of the Project Zero Committee since 2000. Gardner is also a part time lecturer at Harvard University in the field of Psychology. Gardner is the John H. and the Elizabeth A. Hobbs Tutor at the Graduate School of Education at Harvard University (Arizona State University, 2022).

In 1967, Professor Nelson Goodman started an educational program called Project Zero at the Harvard Graduate School of Education, which began with a focus in arts education and now spans a wide variety of educational arenas. Howard Gardner and David Perkins were founding Research Assistants and later Co-Directed Project Zero from 1972 to 2000. Project Zero's mission is to understand and enhance learning, thinking, and creativity in the arts, as well as a broad range of humanistic and scientific disciplines at the individual and institutional levels.

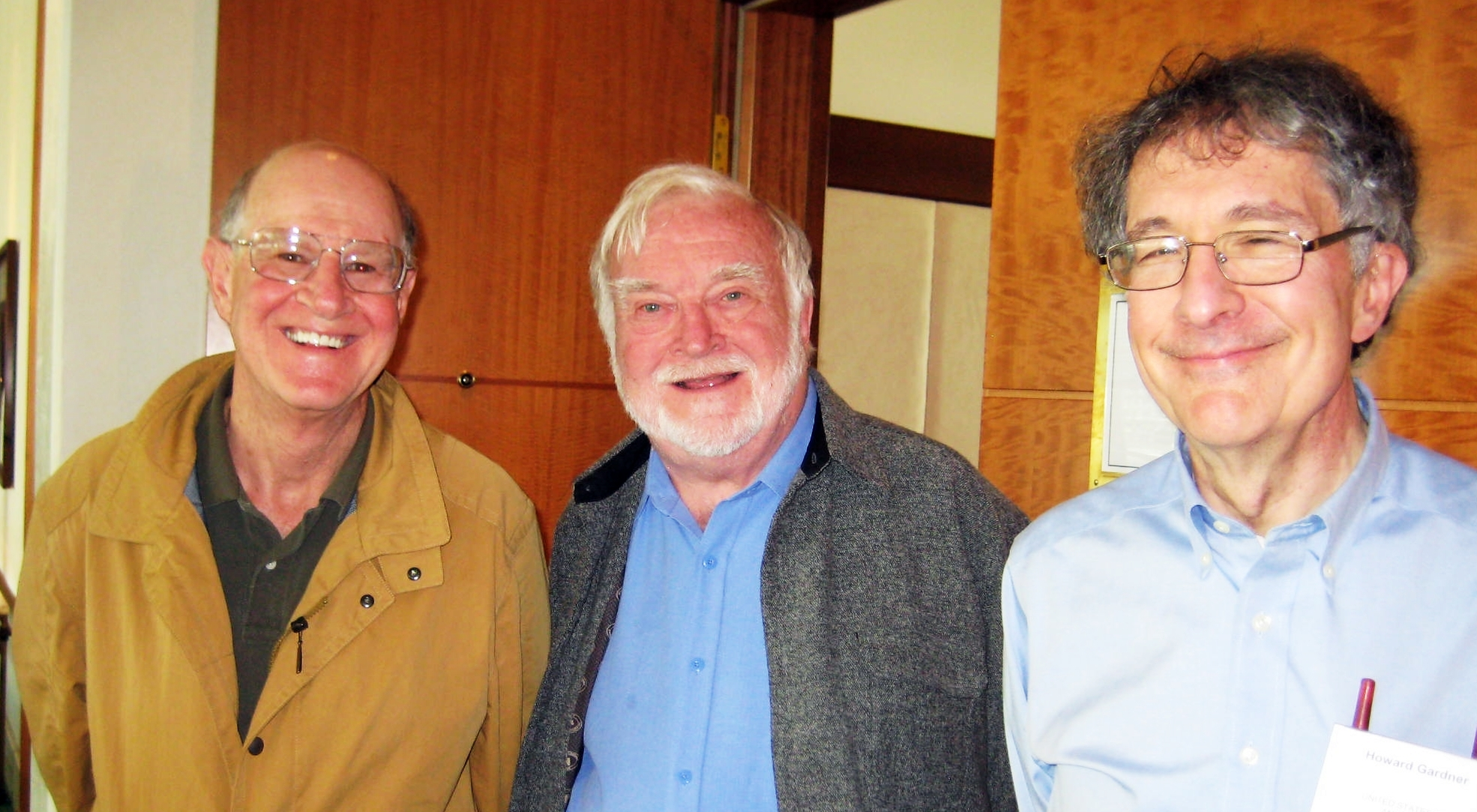
Good Project founders: William Damon, Mihaly Csikszentmihalyi, and Gardner

For over two decades, in collaboration with William Damon, Mihaly Csikszentmihalyi, and several other colleagues, Gardner has been directing research at The Good Project on the nature of good work, good play, and good collaboration. The goal of his research is to determine what it means to achieve work that is at once excellent, engaging, and carried out in an ethical way. With colleagues Lynn Barendsen, Courtney Bither, Shelby Clark, Wendy Fischman, Carrie James, Kirsten McHugh, and Danny Mucinskas, Gardner has developed curricular toolkits on these topics for use in educational and professional circles.

Since 1995, much of the focus of his work has been on The GoodWork Project, now part of a larger initiative known as The Good Project that encourages excellence, ethics, and engagement in work, digital life, and civic society.

In 2000, Gardner, Kurt Fischer, and their colleagues at the Harvard Graduate School of Education established the master's degree program in Mind, Brain, and Education. This program was thought to be the first of its kind around the world. Many universities in both the United States and abroad have since developed similar programs. Since then, Gardner has published books on a number of topics including Changing Minds: The Art and Science of Changing Our Own and Other People's Minds, Five Minds for the Future, Truth, Beauty and Goodness Reframed, and The App Generation (written with Katie Davis).

Since 2012, Gardner has been co-directing a major study of higher education in the United States with Wendy Fischman and several other colleagues. Information about the study, including several dozen blogs, is available on Gardner's website. In March 2022, MIT Press published Wendy Fischman and Howard Gardner's book The Real World of College: What Higher Education Is and What It Can Be.

At the start of 2024, Gardner was the most cited Educational Scholar in the United States, according to the Edu-Scholar Public Influence Ratings.

In 2024, Teachers College Press published two collections of Gardner’s papers: The Essential Howard Gardner on Education and The Essential Howard Gardner on Mind.

In September 2025, Bloomberg News reported that Gardner's name was among a sizable group that had turned up in a large cache of Jeffrey Epstein's emails. Gardner, who was one of the many social scientists whose research projects had received funding from Epstein, knew him only as a wealthy philanthropist, and said that he was "horrified" when Epstein was charged with sex trafficking of minors in 2019.

== Theory of multiple intelligences ==
According to Gardner's theory of multiple intelligences, humans have several different ways of processing information, and these ways are relatively independent of one another. The theory is a critique of the standard intelligence theory, which emphasizes the correlation among abilities, as well as traditional measures like IQ tests that typically only account for linguistic, logical, and spatial abilities. Since 1999, Gardner has identified eight intelligences: linguistic, logical-mathematical, musical, spatial, bodily/kinesthetic, interpersonal, intrapersonal, and naturalistic. Gardner and colleagues have also considered two additional intelligences, existential and pedagogical. Many teachers, school administrators, and special educators have been inspired by Gardner's theory of multiple intelligences.

Gardner's definition of intelligence has been met with some criticism in education circles as well as in the field of psychology. Perhaps the strongest and most enduring critique of his theory of multiple intelligences centers on its lack of empirical evidence, much of which points to a single construct of intelligence called "g". Gardner has responded that his theory is based entirely on empirical evidence as opposed to experimental evidence, as he does not believe experimental evidence in itself can yield a theoretical synthesis.

Gardner's theory of multiple intelligences can be seen as both a departure from and a continuation of the 20th century's work on the subject of human intelligence. Other prominent psychologists whose contributions variously developed or expanded the field of study include Charles Spearman, Louis Thurstone, Edward Thorndike, and Robert Sternberg.

== Achievements and awards ==
In 1981, Gardner was the recipient of a MacArthur Prize Fellowship. In 1990, he received the University of Louisville Grawemeyer Award in Education. In 1985, The National Psychology Awards for Excellence in the Media, awarded Gardner The Book Award for Frames of Mind: The Theory of Multiple Intelligences. In 1987, he received the William James Award from the American Psychological Association. SUNY Plattsburgh inducted Gardner selected Gardner for honoris causa membership in Omicron Delta Kappa in 1998. In 1999, Gardner received the Golden Plate Award of the American Academy of Achievement. In 2000 he received a fellowship from the John S. Guggenheim Memorial Foundation. Four years later he was named an Honorary Professor at East China Normal University in Shanghai. In the years 2005 and 2008 he was selected by Foreign Policy and Prospect magazines as one of the top 100 most influential public intellectuals in the world. In 2011, he won the Prince of Asturias Award in Social Sciences for his development of multiple intelligences theory. In 2015, he received the Brock International Prize in Education. In 2020, Gardner received the Distinguished Contributions to Research in Education Award from the American Education Research Association.

He has received honorary degrees from 31 colleges and universities around the world, including institutions in Bulgaria, Canada, Chile, Greece, Hong Kong, Ireland, Israel, Italy, South Korea, and Spain. He is also a member of several honorary societies: American Academy of Arts and Sciences, American Philosophical Society, National Academy of Education, and the American Academy of Political and Social Science.

== Association with child sex offender Jeffrey Epstein ==
Gardner had a correspondence with child sex offender Jeffrey Epstein. He first met Epstein at a dinner party in the 1990s. Epstein subsequently supported some of Gardner's research and linked him to other "thought leaders". After Epstein's arrest in 2006, Gardner told Epstein that he would not accept further funding from him, but he remained in touch until 2019. In October 2007, Gardner emailed Epstein in response to "a reading list and advice about offsprings". In that same email, Gardner advised Epstein, who was going to jail within a year, to "take a deep breath, take one day at a time, and you'll get through the coming period fine". In another email to Epstein, Gardner wrote: "As for the other, more personal question that you posed, that requires a longer conversation-whenever you'd like". According to Gardner, "[o]nce he had been arrested, I made it clear to him that I could no longer accept any funding but, as a friend and beneficiary of his philanthropy, I tried to be supportive...Of course, no one I knew (which included dozens of Harvard faculty) had any idea of the nature and extent of Epstein’s crimes, which only became clear in the following years."

== Personal life ==
In 1982, Howard Gardner married Ellen Winner, Professor Emerita of Psychology at Boston College. They have one child. Gardner has three children from an earlier marriage.

== Publications ==
Howard Gardner has published more than 30 books, many of which have been translated into different languages.
