= Playbour =

Form of play and labour

Playbour (sometimes spelled playbor) is a hybrid form of play and labour, specifically in the digital games industry.

== History ==
The term was coined by Julian Kücklich in 2005 in his article Precarious playbour: Modders and the digital games industry. Kücklich describes playbour as a type of free labour that fits neither traditional definitions of work nor the categories of play or leisure. Kücklich argues that the labor of gaming and the work that gamers put in to modifying the games they play should be recognized as labor that produces capital for others. Nevertheless, forms of playbour are often incorrectly perceived as being just an extension of play. Playbour is also sometimes categorized as a part of the gamification of society in general.

While the term playbour itself is a relatively new invention, the phenomena it concerns – those of productive leisure and free labour in the digital games industry – have been around at least since the late 1990s. Kücklich states that since the early 1990s, the relationship between the players of digital games and the digital games industry has changed substantially. He attributes the alteration to the rise of computer game modification, or "modding", as a widespread practice among players.

By 2012, the term playbour was expanded upon by Trebor Scholz. In his talk at re:publica in 2016, Scholz touched on How Platform Cooperativism Can Unleash the Network. As he argues, worker cooperatives (or co-ops for short) are not a new concept. They are for-profit "business enterprises owned and governed by their employees", without a traditional shareholder structure. In 2004, the U.S. Federation of Worker Cooperatives (USFWC) was created to provide a national membership organization for worker cooperatives. Not only do they foster quality, empowering jobs for members of the community, but often exercise sustainable business practices as compared to other corporate businesses enterprises. In this democratic workplace environment, workers align themselves behind the principle of 'one worker, one vote', with equal representation on the board of directors. Beyond this, however, he argues we must address this issue of ownership. In 2014, Scholz proposed a theory of platform cooperativism.

Scholz argues for this alternative model of ownership to apply to modern gig economy companies. He continues to argue that the problem is not the technology: platforms are both efficient and scalable. It is the ownership structure, itself, that guides whether or not a platform can be considered influential, and consequently, participating in the notion of platform cooperativism.

Scholz asks what motivates playbour and other participatory labor pursuits in his book Uberworked and Underpaid. Relating the way companies such as Facebook, Google, and Apple (among others) push the burden of labor onto consumers as "whitewashing the fence for the twenty-first century," a reference to the classic Adventures of Tom Sawyer narrative, the issue of motivation and promised outcomes becomes complicated as users are expected to engage in labor for free in order to enjoy the benefits of different technologies. Scholz argues that this is a deceptive strategy, "[making] it look as if [corporations] are merely helping people to do the work that they are keen to do already."

=== Modding ===
Creating mods for digital games is the perfect example of playbour: a growing number of consumers of digital games are not satisfied with just playing the game, but prefer to enhance their playing experience by creating content for the game themselves. In modding we can see the very essence of playbour, or free labour: while the work of creating a modification can be seen as playful and enjoyable, it is still work. In this respect modding can be fairly similar to another form of collaborative digital production; open-source software development. The first game to gain a modder base of considerable size is widely agreed to be Doom (1993). The emergence of Doom mods is usually attributed to the fact that the game's code was deliberately designed to facilitate player-created content. The most famous modder creation is probably Counter-Strike, originally a team-based mod for Half-Life (1998). It later also became the first commercially released mod.

Modders have formed robust online communities to share their mods and collaborate with each other. The website Nexus Mods hosts over 280,000 mod files for over 1,000 games. The site also features modding tools and tutorials for mod developers, as well as discussion forums for its 23,000,000+ members. Modding has become an important part of the video game industry.

In 2012, the developers of Skyrim, Bethesda Game Studios, created their own modding kit called "The Creation Kit." The Creation Kit was a free software development tool that enabled users to alter game content. The software also allowed the user to share their mods once they were complete. They could release the mods publicly to the authorized Steam Workshop Channel.

== Controversy around playbour and modding ==
Not only is modding a big part of gaming culture, but it is also an increasingly important source of value for the digital games industry. Game companies usually retain the intellectual property rights of the modifications. Since players need to have a copy of the original game to run the modifications, mods may add to the shelf-life of the product. In addition to that, mods may help with establishing brands (e.g. Counter-Strike), thus saving companies a significant amount of money. Marketing costs often take up a large percentage of a game's budget, but successfully established brands require less marketing. Mods also increase customer loyalty and are an important source of innovation in the digital games industry. Another way that game companies can benefit from the modding culture is that they can recruit modders as employees who are already trained at no cost to the company.

While game companies may benefit economically from playbour, the players doing the work are not entirely uncompensated: they may obtain virtual in-game rewards or social capital such as followers on social media. Some modding sites, like Nexus Mods, have started to use crowdfunding tools like Patreon to raise money for mod authors. The experience of play also has value in itself. Playbour is a voluntary activity and players don't usually view modding as labour. Nevertheless, it has been suggested that playbour modders are exploited by the games industry.

== See also ==
- Gamification
- Modding
- Mod (video gaming)
- Participatory culture
- Work as play
