= Keith Sawyer =

American psychologist

Robert Keith Sawyer
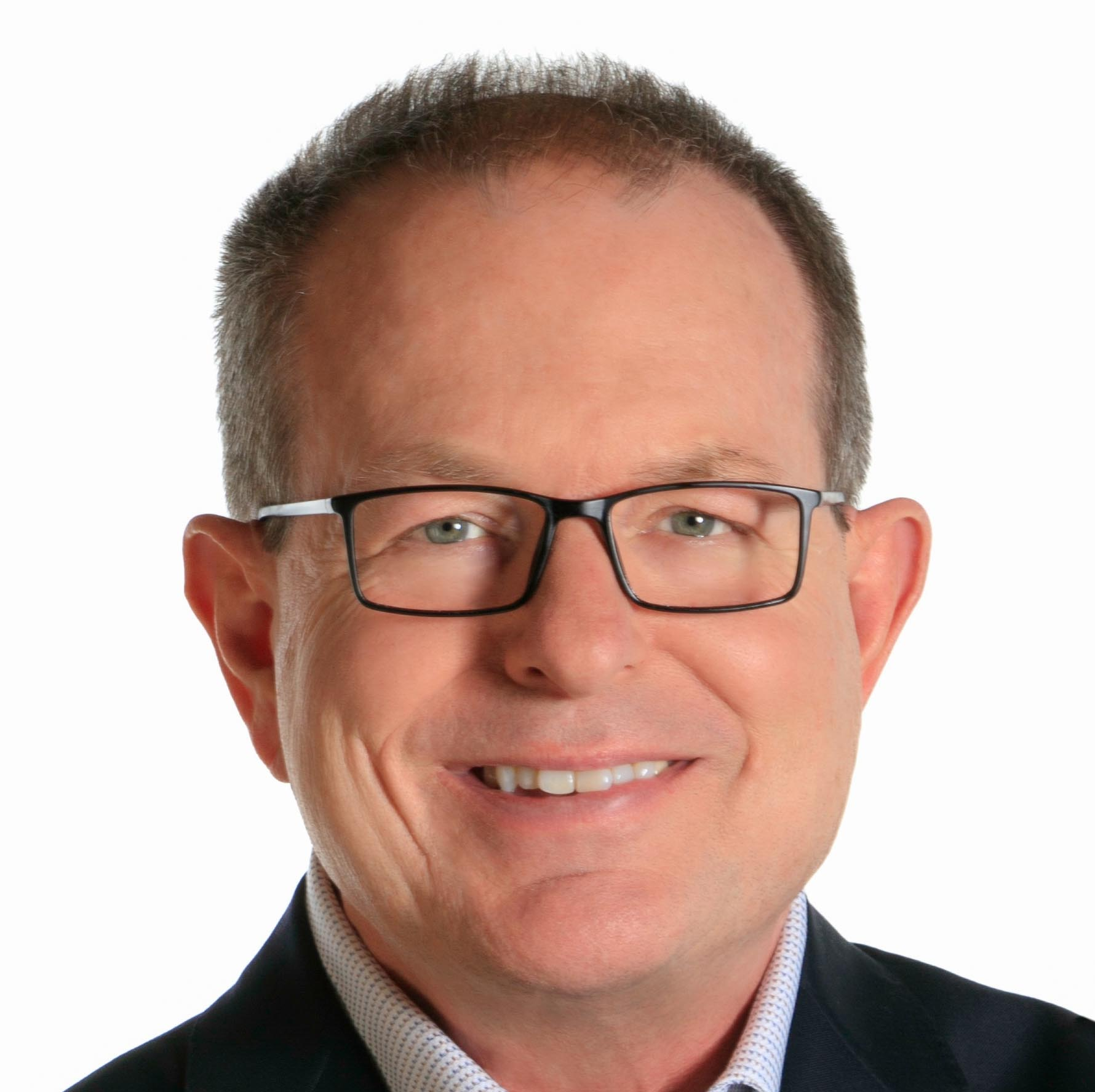
- Keith Sawyer, 2024
- Born: April 28, 1960 (age 66)
- Occupations: Psychologist, author
- Known for: Creativity, Collaboration, Learning
- Title: Morgan Distinguished Professor in Educational Innovations

Academic background
- Education: University of Chicago, Massachusetts Institute of Technology
- Thesis: The performance of pretend play: enacting peer culture in conversation (1994)
- Doctoral advisor: Mihaly Csikszentmihalyi

Academic work
- Discipline: Psychology
- Institutions: University of North Carolina at Chapel Hill
- Website: www.keithsawyer.com

Robert Keith Sawyer is an American psychologist. He is an expert on creativity, collaboration, and learning. He has published 20 books and over 100 scientific articles. In 2025, he published Learning to See: Inside the World's Leading Art and Design Schools. His best-known books are Group Genius, Zig Zag, and Explaining Creativity. Fifteen of his books have been translated into other language editions, primarily Chinese, Japanese, and Korean. He is the Morgan Distinguished Professor in Educational Innovations at University of North Carolina at Chapel Hill.

He is the host of the podcast The Science of Creativity, published biweekly since March 2024, as well as the Substack newsletter of the same name.

== Books ==
- R. Keith Sawyer (2025). Learning to See: Inside the World's Leading Art and Design Schools. MIT Press. ISBN 9780262551649.
- R. Keith Sawyer and Danah Henriksen (2024). Explaining Creativity: The Science of Human Innovation (third ed.). Oxford University Press. ISBN 978-0197747537.
- R. Keith Sawyer, ed. (2022). The Cambridge Handbook of the Learning Sciences. Cambridge University Press. ISBN 978-1108840989.
- R. Keith Sawyer (2019). The Creative Classroom: Innovative Teaching for 21st Century Learners. Teachers College Press. ISBN 9780807777633.
- R. Keith Sawyer (2017). Group Genius: The Creative Power of Collaboration (Second ed.). Basic Books. ISBN 9780465096633.
- Michael Evans; Michael Packer; R. Keith Sawyer, eds. (2016). Reflections on the Learning Sciences: Past, Present, and Future. Cambridge University Press. ISBN 978-1107070158.
- R. Keith Sawyer, ed. (2014). The Cambridge Handbook of the Learning Sciences (Second ed.). Cambridge University Press.
- R. Keith Sawyer (2013). Zig Zag: The Surprising Path to Greater Creativity. Wiley. ISBN 978-1-118-29770-4.
- R. Keith Sawyer (2012). Explaining Creativity: The Science of Human Innovation (Second ed.). Oxford University Press.
- R. Keith Sawyer, ed. (2011). Structure and Improvisation in Creative Teaching. Oxford University Press. ISBN 978-0521746328.
- R. Keith Sawyer (2007). Group Genius: The Creative Power of Collaboration (First ed.). Basic Books.
- R. Keith Sawyer, ed. (2006). The Cambridge Handbook of the Learning Sciences (First ed.). Cambridge University Press.
- R. Keith Sawyer (2006). Explaining Creativity: The Science of Human Innovation (First ed.). Oxford University Press.
- R. Keith Sawyer (2005). Social Emergence: Societies as Complex Systems. Cambridge University Press. ISBN 978-0521606370.
- R. Keith Sawyer (2003). Creativity and Development. Oxford University Press.
- R. Keith Sawyer (2003). Group Creativity: Music, Theater, Collaboration. Erlbaum.
- R. Keith Sawyer (2003). Improvised Dialogues: Emergence and Creativity in Conversation. Ablex.
- R. Keith Sawyer (2001). Creating Conversations: Improvisation in Everyday Discourse. Hampton Press.
- R. Keith Sawyer, ed. (1997). Creativity in Performance. Ablex.
- R. Keith Sawyer (1997). Pretend Play as Improvisation: Conversation in the Preschool Classroom. Erlbaum.

== Selected publications ==
- Sawyer, R. Keith (2021). "The dialogue of creativity: Teaching the creative process by animating student work as a collaborating creative agent". Cognition and Instruction. 40 (4): 459–487. doi:10.1080/07370008.2021.1958219.
- Sawyer, R. Keith (2021). "Teaching creative thinking: How design professors externalize their creative thinking in studio classroom talk". Mind, Culture, and Activity. 29 (1): 21–42. doi:10.1080/10749039.2021.1893337.
- Sawyer, R. Keith (2018). "Teaching and learning how to create in schools of art and design". Journal of the Learning Sciences. 27 (1): 137–181. doi:10.1080/10508406.2017.1381963.
- Sawyer, R. Keith (2016). "How artists create: An empirical study of MFA painting students". Journal of Creative Behavior. 52 (2): 127–141.
- Sawyer, R. Keith (2003). "Artificial societies multiagent systems and the micro-macro link in sociological theory". Sociological Methods & Research. 31 (3): 325–363. doi:10.1177/0049124102239079. S2CID 15490470.
- Sawyer, R. Keith (2006). "Group creativity: Musical performance and collaboration". Psychology of Music. 34 (2): 148–165. doi:10.1177/0305735606061850. S2CID 145105412.
- Sawyer, R. Keith (2011). "The cognitive neuroscience of creativity: A critical review". The Creativity Research Journal. 23 (2): 137–154.
