= Molecular Materials Research Group =

The Molecular Materials Research Group (MMRG) is a multidisciplinary research group composed of several Ph.D. members as well as the expertise of other researchers in the field of Computational, Organic and Analytical Chemistry.

Located at Madeira University in Madeira, its main scientific activity is devoted to the preparation and characterization of potentially useful molecular materials with enhanced electronic and biomedical properties. The development of new materials based in dendrimers for gene delivery and for non-linear optical applications is one of their primary goals.
