= Madeira Interactive Technologies Institute =

Interactive Technologies Institute
- Motto in English: Designing innovative interactive technologies to foster a sustainable, inclusive, and aesthetically-pleasing future
- Type: Public university institutes
- Established: 12 December 2009
- Parent institution: Instituto Superior Técnico
- President: Nuno Jardim Nunes
- Location: Lisbon, Portugal
- Website: www.iti.larsys.pt

Nuno Jardim Nunes

The Interactive Technologies Institute (formerly known as M-ITI, Madeira Interactive Technologies Institute) is a teaching and research institute of the Instituto Superior Técnico, which has its headquartered located in Lisbon, Portugal.

== History ==
It was formerly a state-run Portuguese graduate school and research institute. It was conceived in 2000, formally integrated as a research group in 2007, and established as an Innovation Institute in 2010. It resulted from a collaborative connection between the University of Madeira, Madeira Tecnopolo, and Carnegie Mellon University. M-ITI has also been a member of the National Associated Laboratory for Robotics and Systems in Engineering and Science (LARSyS) since 2011.

Since then, M-ITI became the Interactive Technologies Institute, when the institute moved from the Madeira Islands to be integrated as one of the research units of Instituto Superior Técnico. Currently, the Interactive Technologies Institute is located at the Hub Criativo do Beato, where its facilities were inaugurated on October 17 2023, by the Mayor of Lisbon at the time, Carlos Moedas.

== Partnership with Carnegie Mellon University ==
M-ITI operated in the interdisciplinary domain of Human-Computer Interaction (HCI), with contributions from the disciplines of Computer Sciences, Psychology and Social Sciences, and Design. It had a partnership with the Human-Computer Interaction Institute (HCII) at Carnegie Mellon University (US), which was founded by computer science pioneers Allen Newell (Turing Award) and Herbert A. Simon (Turing Award and Nobel Prize in Economics). The HCII at Carnegie Mellon is recognized as a worldwide leader in HCI research. M-ITI grew through this collaboration, which was made possible by the Carnegie Mellon - Portugal International Partnership, an initiative conducted by the Portuguese national government that supports collaborative teaching and research between universities in Portugal and Carnegie Mellon University.

== Educational programs ==
- Masters in Computer Sciences
- PhD in Informatics Engineering
- PhD in Digital Media (new 2015) partnership between FEUP (Faculdade de Engenharia da Universidade do Porto), FCT-UNL (Faculdade de Ciências e Tecnologia da Universidade Nova de Lisboa), and the UT (University of Texas) in Austin, US. Program Co-orientation and co-supervision at M-ITI
- PhD in Networked Interactive Cyber Physical Systems (NETSyS) (new 2015) – partnership between IST-UL (Instituto Superior Técnico da Universidade de Lisboa) with CMU Portugal (Carnegie Mellon University) and LARSyS. Program Co-orientation and co-supervision at M-ITI
- Professional Masters In Human Computer Interaction (MHCI under the Carnegie Mellon | Portugal International Partnership)°
- Masters in Entertainment Technology (MET under the Carnegie Mellon | Portugal International Partnership)°
- Bridging-Program in Human Aspects of Technology

° These programs were taught partially in Funchal, in University of Madeira – Portugal, and partially in Carnegie Mellon University, Pittsburgh, PA – US.

=== External evaluation ===
These have been recognized by several independent evaluation committees, in particular the external review committee of the programme, composed by professors Sir John O'Reilly, vice-chancellor of Cranfield U. (UK); Luigia Aiello, of Sapienza U. of Roma (Italy); Tariq Durrani, of Strathclyde U. (UK); and Joel Moses, former provost of MIT (US).
