= Institute for Applied Autonomy =

Organization

The Institute for Applied Autonomy was an activist group of anonymous artists known for employing technology in protest. The group focused on dissemination of knowledge, autonomy, and methods of self-determination through artistic expression and application of military-like technology to the topics of Criminal Mischief, decentralized systems and individual autonomy.

== History ==
The Institute for Applied Autonomy was founded in 1998 as an informal research collective around the central theme of contestational robotics.

Its Mission statement was to "study the forces and structures which affect self-determination and to provide technologies which extend the autonomy of human activists."

== Projects ==
One of its better known initiatives was i-See, a decentralized CCTV map distribution software containing user-generated data including positioning of surveillance cameras in New York City, as well as several other international city centers, in protest of privacy violations on the general public.

In 2003, they took part in the Cartographic Congress organised by the University of Openess in London

Their project TXTMob, a registration system for cell phones to allow protest groups rapid, anonymous communication, was used during the 2004 Republican National Convention. TXTMob allowed users to subscribe to groups of like-minded persons via a web interface. Once subscribed, messages sent to the group would be passed from the web to the group members' cell phones. In February 2008, the New York City Law Department issued a subpoena directed to the programmer of TXTMob, asking him to reveal users of the service and contents of messages sent during the convention.

Other IAA projects included the Graffiti writer and Terminal air.

All IAA artwork has been copylefted, with permission for use as long as it is attributed.
