= TXTMob =

TXTmob is a service, similar to electronic mailing lists and predecessor to Twitter, that lets users share mobile phone SMS text messages with both friends and total strangers. Users can sign up to send and receive messages to and from various groups, which are organized around a range of different topics.

== History ==
TXTMob was first developed by the Institute for Applied Autonomy for protesters at the 2004 Democratic National Convention in Boston and the 2004 Republican National Convention in New York City (see 2004 Republican National Convention protest activity). Tad Hirsch, a researcher in the Massachusetts Institute of Technology's Smart Cities Group and Computing Culture Research Group, continues to offer TXTmob cleaned up, packaged and released under the GPL via SourceForge.

Tad Hirsch, creator of TXTMob, was the subject of a subpoena by the City of New York in connection with several lawsuits against the City that allege police misconduct during the 2004 Republican National Convention.

== Features ==
The TXTMob service will forward messages received to all members of a particular group as they are received. In an unmoderated group, any group member can send a text message to be received by all other members of that group. Groups can also be moderated, in which case the group is set up as a sort of announcement-only group, which is used primarily as a one-way conduit of information and text messages can only be sent by selected people (often just that group's particular administrator).

=== Groups ===
A public group is one which any TXTMob member may join. Membership in a private group is limited by the group's administrators. When an individual first attempts to join a private group, his or her membership will be listed as "pending." Once an administrator of the group upgrades their membership, they will be able to receive messages, and depending on if the group is moderated or not, send messages. Secret groups are similar to private groups in that membership is restricted by the group's administrators. However, membership in secret groups is by invitation only; secret groups do not appear in group directories and uninvited members are unable to sign up for "pending memberships".

== Legacy ==
TXTMob was one of the example services which was used as a model for the service Twitter when it was originally created.

== See also ==
- Locative media art
