= Between the Bars (blog) =

Between the Bars (est. 2010) is an American blog that publishes letters from people held in prison in the United States. The open-source blog platform was developed by Charlie DeTar. The Massachusetts Institute of Technology hosts the website.

The project attempts to provide a communication channel for prisoners who lack access to the internet. Prisoners write letters and send them by postal mail to the MIT. Volunteers at the MIT then digitize each page and post them on the website in PDF format. As of September 2011, the blog had received, scanned and posted letters from some 275 inmates in Delano, California; Raiford, Florida; Missouri; New Boston, Texas; Walla Walla, Washington; Boscobel, Wisconsin; and elsewhere in the U.S.
