= Flow (psychology) =

Full immersion in an activity

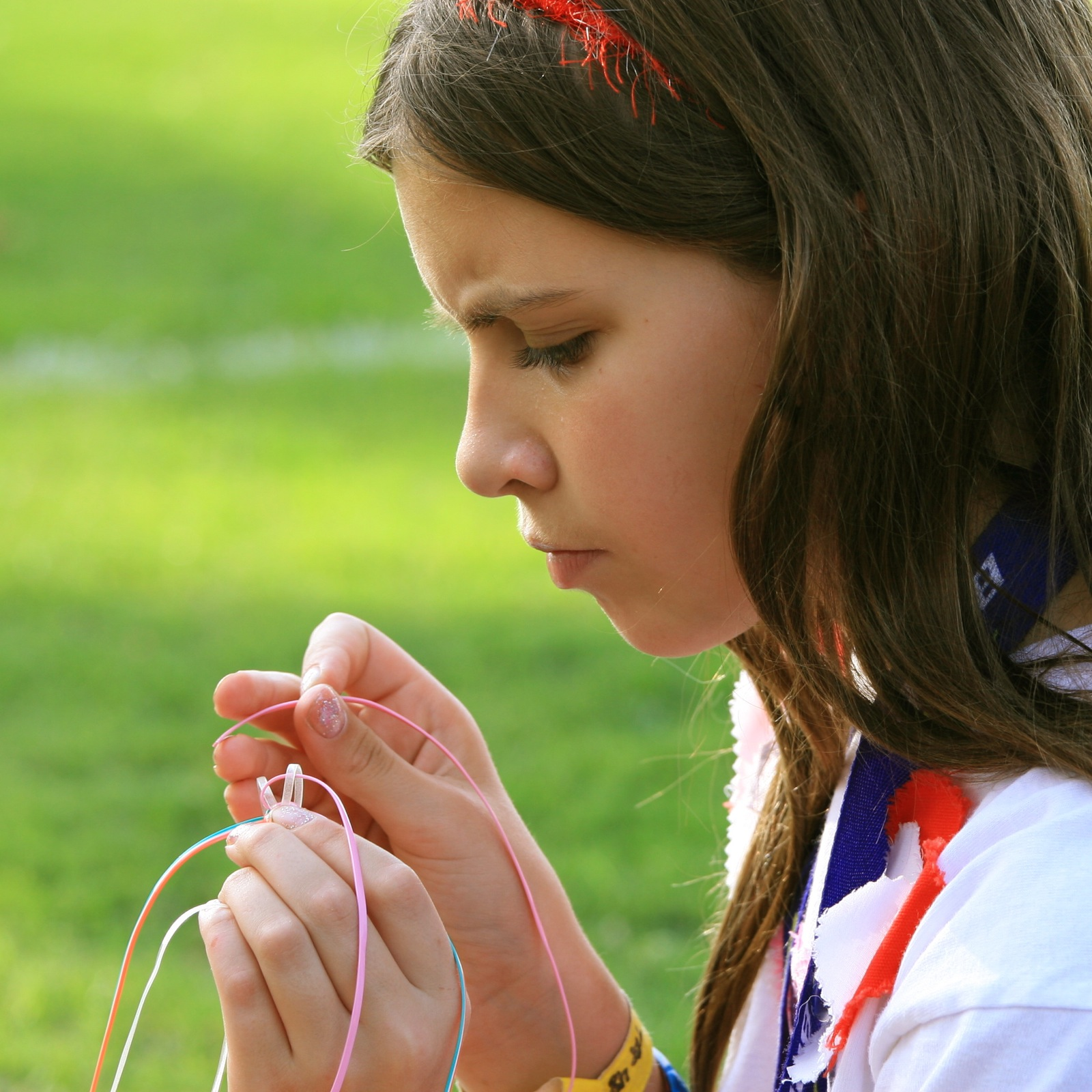
Concentrating on a task, one aspect of flow

Flow in positive psychology, also known colloquially as being "in the zone" or focused, is the mental state in which a person performing some activity is fully immersed in a feeling of energized focus, full involvement, and enjoyment in the process of the activity. In essence, flow is characterized by the complete absorption in what one does, and a resulting transformation in one's sense of time. Flow is the bonding together of action and consciousness; the state of finding a balance between a skill and how challenging that task is. It requires a high level of concentration. Flow is used as a coping skill for stress and anxiety when productively pursuing a form of leisure that matches one's skill set.

First presented in the 1975 book Beyond Boredom and Anxiety by the Hungarian-American psychologist Mihály Csíkszentmihályi, the concept has been widely referred to across a variety of fields (and is particularly well recognized in occupational therapy).

The flow state shares many characteristics with hyperfocus. However, hyperfocus is not always described in a positive light. Some examples include spending "too much" time playing video games or becoming pleasurably absorbed by one aspect of an assignment or task to the detriment of the overall assignment. In some cases, hyperfocus can "capture" a person, perhaps causing them to appear unfocused or to start several unfinished projects. Hyperfocus is often mentioned "in the context of autism, schizophrenia, and attention deficit hyperactivity disorder – conditions that have consequences on attentional abilities."

Flow is an individual experience and the idea behind flow originated from the sport psychology theory about an Individual Zone of Optimal Functioning. The individuality of the concept of flow suggests that each person has their subjective area of flow, where they would function best given the situation. One is most likely to experience flow at moderate levels of psychological arousal, as one is unlikely to be overwhelmed, but not understimulated to the point of boredom.

== Etymology ==
Flow is so named because, during Csíkszentmihályi's 1975 interviews, several people described their "flow" experiences using the metaphor of a water current carrying them along:

We have called this state the flow experience, because this is the term many of the people we interviewed had used in their descriptions of how it felt to be in top form: "It was like floating," "I was carried on by the flow."

— Csikszentmihályi, Flow (1990)

== History ==
Mihaly Csikszentmihályi and others began researching flow after he became fascinated by artists who would essentially get lost in their work. Artists, especially painters, got so immersed in their work that they would disregard their need for food, water and even sleep. The theory of flow came about when Csikszentmihályi tried to understand the phenomenon experienced by these artists. Flow research became prevalent in the 1980s and 1990s, with Csikszentmihályi and his colleagues in Italy still at the forefront. Researchers grew interested in optimal experiences and emphasizing positive experiences, especially in places such as schools and the business world. They also began studying the theory of flow at this time.

The cognitive science of flow has been studied under the rubric of effortless attention.

== Components ==
Jeanne Nakamura and Csíkszentmihályi identify the following six factors as encompassing an experience of flow:

1. Intense and focused concentration on the present moment
2. Merging of action and awareness
3. A loss of reflective self-consciousness
4. A sense of personal control or agency over the situation or activity
5. A distortion of temporal experience, as one's subjective experience of time is altered
6. Experience of the activity as intrinsically rewarding, also referred to as autotelic experience

Those aspects can appear independently of each other, but only in combination do they constitute a so-called flow experience. Additionally, psychology writer Kendra Cherry has mentioned three other components that Csíkszentmihályi lists as being a part of the flow experience:

1. Immediate feedback
2. Feeling the potential to succeed
3. Feeling so engrossed in the experience that other needs become negligible

Just as with the conditions listed above, these conditions can be independent of one another.

In 2021, Cameron Norsworthy and colleagues aimed to address the inconsistencies and concerns of many of the flow-related models and studies, and proposed a framework that differentiated the flow antecedents and experiential dimensions. Norsworthy et al. identified a core experience of flow including overarching antecedent constructs:

1. Optimal challenge: A perceived capability to meet the challenging demands of the situation
2. High motivation: A high motivational force

And recurring characteristics of the flow experience itself included:

1. Absorption: A state of absorption in the task characterized by focused, undistracted attention, and a merging of action and awareness
2. Effort-less control: A high sense of control in which the task feels less effortful than is typical for that person, characterized by fluidity of performance and an absence of concern over losing control
3. Intrinsic reward: An intrinsically rewarding experience characterized by positive valence and optimal levels of arousal

The proposed definition of flow: Flow is an intrinsically rewarding state of absorption in a task in which a high degree of control feels more effort-less than normal.

== Mechanism ==
In any given moment, a great deal of information is made available to each individual. Psychologists have found that one's mind can attend to only a certain amount of information at a time. According to Csikszentmihályi's 2004 TED talk, that number is about "110 bits of information per second." That may seem like a lot of information, but simple daily tasks take quite a lot of information. Just decoding speech takes about 40–60 bits of information per second, which is why when having a conversation, one cannot focus as much attention on other things.

Generally, people have the ability to decide what they will give their full attention to. This excludes basic distinctive feelings, such as hunger and pain. However, when one is in the flow state, they are completely engrossed with the one task at hand and, without making the conscious decision to do so, lose awareness of all other things: time, people, distractions, and even basic bodily needs. According to Csikszentmihályi, this event occurs because all of the attention of the person in the flow state is on the task at hand; there is no more attention to be allocated.

The flow state has been described by Csikszentmihályi as the "optimal experience" in that one gets to a level of high gratification from the experience. Achieving this experience is considered to be personal and "depends on the ability" of the individual. One's capacity and desire to overcome challenges in order to achieve their ultimate goals leads not only to the optimal experience but also to a sense of life satisfaction overall.

=== Operationalizing flow ===
Despite the attraction of flow and the varying flow interventions (e.g., mindfulness, goal-setting, visualisation) there has existed no gold standard intervention to promote flow experiences. Recently, Norsworthy et al. found continued evidence that it may be possible to 'train' flow through an educational intervention of flow.

== Measurement ==
There are three common ways to measure flow experiences: the flow questionnaire (FQ), the experience sampling method (ESM), and the "standardized scales of the componential approach."

=== Flow questionnaire ===
The FQ requires individuals to identify definitions of flow and situations in which they believe that they have experienced flow, followed by a section that asks them to evaluate their personal experiences in these flow-inducing situations. The FQ identifies flow as multiple constructs, therefore allowing the results to be used to estimate differences in the likelihood of experiencing flow across a variety of factors. Another strength of the FQ is that it does not assume that everyone's flow experiences are the same. Because of this, the FQ is the ideal measure for estimating the prevalence of flow. However, the FQ has some weaknesses that more recent methods have set out to address. The FQ does not allow for a measurement of the intensity of flow during specific activities. This method also does not measure the influence of the ratio of challenge to skill on the flow state.

=== Experience sampling method ===
The ESM requires individuals to fill out the experience sampling form (ESF) at eight randomly chosen time intervals throughout the day. The purpose of this is to understand subjective experiences by estimating the time intervals that individuals spend in specific states during everyday life. The ESF is made up of 13 categorical items and 29 scaled items. The purpose of the categorical items is to determine the context and motivational aspects of the current actions (these items include: time, location, companionship/desire for companionship, activity being performed, reason for performing activity). Because these are open-ended questions, the answers need to be coded by researchers. This needs to be done carefully so as to avoid any biases in the statistical analysis. The scaled items are intended to measure the levels of a variety of subjective feelings that the individual may be experiencing. The ESM is more complex than the FQ and contributes to understanding how flow plays out in a variety of situations. However, the possible biases make it a risky choice.

=== Standardized scales ===
Jackson and colleagues have created several scales that have been proven to be psychometrically valid and reliable: the Flow State Scale-2 (FSS-2) (which measures flow as a state), and the Dispositional Flow Scale-2 (DFS-2) (designed to measure flow as a trait, either general or domain-specific), being the most widely known. The statistical analysis of the DFS-2 and FSS-2 scales gives a more complete understanding of flow from a dimensional perspective than the ESM or the FQ. Jackson and colleagues also created short versions of the FSS-2 and DFS-2, and an additional brief scale that assesses the subjective experience of flow, called the Core Flow Scales. More recently, the Psychological Flow Scale (PFS) that was designed to be used across domains and scientific disciplines was validated and offers a parsimonious alternative model of flow.

== Characteristics ==
Mental state in terms of challenge level and skill level, according to Csikszentmihalyi's flow model. (Click on a fragment of the image to go to the appropriate article)

The flow state can be entered while performing any activity; however, it is more likely to occur when the task or activity is wholeheartedly engaged for intrinsic purposes. Passive activities such as taking a bath or even watching TV usually do not elicit a flow experience because active engagement is prerequisite to entering the flow state. While the activities that induce flow vary and may be multifaceted, Csikszentmihályi asserts that the experience of flow is similar whatever the activity.

Flow theory postulates that three conditions must be met to achieve flow:

1. The activity must have clear goals and progress. This establishes structure and direction.
2. The task must provide clear and immediate feedback. This helps to negotiate any changing demands and allows adjusting performance to maintain the flow state.
3. Good balance is required between the perceived challenges of the task and one's perceived skills. Confidence in the ability to complete the task is required.

It has been argued that the antecedent factors of flow are interrelated, and as such, a balance between perceived challenges and skills requires that the goals are clear and feedback is effective. Thus, such balance can be identified as the central precondition of flow experience.

In 1987, Massimini, Csíkszentmihályi and Carli published the eight-channel (or eight-sector) model of flow. (See Figure.) Antonella Delle Fave, who worked with Fausto Massimini at the University of Milan, calls this graph the Experience Fluctuation Model. The model depicts the channels of experience that result from different levels of perceived challenges and perceived skills. The graph illustrates another aspect of flow: it is more likely to occur when the activity is a higher-than-average challenge (above the center point) and the individual has above-average skills (to the right of the center point). The center of the graph where the sectors meet represents the average level of challenge and skill across all individual daily activities. The further from the center an experience is, the greater the intensity of that state of being, whether it is flow or anxiety or boredom or relaxation.

Several problems of the model have been discussed in the literature. One is that it does not ensure the perceived balance between challenges and skills, which is said to be the central precondition of flow experience. Individuals with a low average level of skills and a high average level of challenges (or the converse) do not necessarily experience a match between skills and challenges when both are above their individual average. Another study found that low challenge situations which were surpassed by skill were associated with enjoyment, relaxation, and happiness, which, they claim, is contrary to flow theory.

Schaffer (2013) proposed seven flow conditions:

1. Knowing what to do
2. Knowing how to do it
3. Knowing how well one is doing
4. Knowing where to go (if navigation is involved)
5. High perceived challenges
6. High perceived skills
7. Freedom from distractions

Schaffer published a flow condition questionnaire (FCQ), to measure each of these seven flow conditions for any given task or activity.

=== Challenges to maintaining flow ===
Some of the challenges to staying in flow include states of apathy, boredom, and anxiety. The state of apathy is characterized by easy challenges and low skill level requirements, resulting in a general lack of interest in the activity. Boredom is a slightly different state that occurs when challenges are few, but one's skill level exceeds those challenges causing one to seek higher challenges. A state of anxiety occurs when challenges are high enough to exceed perceived skill level, causing distress and uneasiness. These states in general prevent achieving the balance necessary for flow. Csíkszentmihályi has said, "If challenges are too low, one gets back to flow by increasing them. If challenges are too great, one can return to the flow state by learning new skills."

=== The autotelic personality ===
Csíkszentmihályi hypothesized that people with certain personality traits may be better able to achieve flow than the average person. These traits include curiosity, persistence, low egotism, and a high propensity to perform activities for intrinsic reasons. People with most of these personality traits are said to have an autotelic personality, i.e. a disposition to actively seek challenges and flow experiences. The term "autotelic" derives from two Greek words, autos ("self") and telos ("end" or "goal").

There is scant research on the autotelic personality, but results of the few studies that have been conducted suggest that indeed some people are more likely to experience flow than others. One researcher (Abuhamdeh, 2000) found that people with an autotelic personality have a greater preference for "high-action-opportunity, high-skills situations that stimulate them and encourage growth" compared to those without an autotelic personality. It is in such high-challenge, high-skills situations that people are most likely to experience flow.

Experimental evidence shows that a balance between individual skills and demands of the task (compared to boredom and overload) only elicits the flow experience in individuals having an internal locus of control or a habitual action orientation. Several correlational studies found need for achievement to be a personal characteristic that fosters flow experiences.

Autotelic Personality also has been shown in studies to correlate and show overlapping of flow in personal life and the Big Five Personality Traits of Extraversion, Agreeableness, Conscientiousness, Neuroticism, and Openness to Experience, especially the traits of agreeableness and extraversion. Study of Autotelic Personality is difficult as most studies are performed through self-evaluation, a recognized difficulty for Big Five questionnaires.

== Group ==
More than one type of flow exists. Group flow (or team flow) is notably different from independent flow, as it is inherently mutual. Group flow is attainable when the performance unit is a group, such as a team or musical group. When groups cooperate to agree on goals and patterns, social flow, commonly known as group cohesion, is much more likely to occur. If a group still has not entered flow, a team-level challenge may stimulate the group to harmonize. Group flow is different from synchronized solitary flow, in which a group is simultaneously experiencing individual flow. Group Flow occurs in an interpersonal manner, in which the act of others being present is inherent to the cause of the state of flow.

In research presented in a review written by PLoS ONE, Pels et al. stated, "Group contexts introduce many additional variables that cause individuals to act, think, and feel differently during group situations compared to solitary situations." Due to these additional variables, the cause and effect of flow are vastly different and unique to the experience of individual flow, hence providing evidence for the existence of a separate flow state: group flow.

=== Physiology of group flow ===
Snijdewint studies the correlation of the physiological effect of a group that simultaneously reports a "flow" state. This research concludes that between many similar studies when a participant reports a feeling of flow state (in synchronization or due to a group environment), there are similarities in the cardiovascular triggers that the participants experience.

== Applications ==
=== Applications suggested by Csíkszentmihályi versus other practitioners ===
Only Csíkszentmihályi seems to have published suggestions for extrinsic applications of the flow concept, such as design methods for playgrounds to elicit the flow experience. Other practitioners of Csíkszentmihályi's flow concept focus on intrinsic applications, such as spirituality, performance improvement, or self-help.

=== Education ===
In education, the concept of overlearning plays a role in a student's ability to achieve flow. Csíkszentmihályi states that overlearning enables the mind to concentrate on visualizing the desired performance as a singular, integrated action instead of a set of actions. Challenging assignments that (slightly) stretch one's skills lead to flow.

In the 1950s British cybernetician Gordon Pask designed an adaptive teaching machine called SAKI, an early example of "e-learning". The machine is discussed in some detail in Stafford Beer's book "Cybernetics and Management". In the patent application for SAKI (1956), Pask's comments (some of which are included below) indicate an awareness of the pedagogical importance of balancing student competence with didactic challenge, which is quite consistent with flow theory:

If the operator is receiving data at too slow a rate, he is likely to become bored and attend to other irrelevant data.

If the data given indicates too precisely what responses the operator is required to make, the skill becomes too easy to perform and the operator again tends to become bored.

If the data given is too complicated or is given at too great a rate, the operator is unable to deal with it. He is then liable to become discouraged and lose interest in performing or learning the skill.

Ideally, for an operator to perform a skill efficiently, the data presented to him should always be of sufficient complexity to maintain his interest and maintain a competitive situation, but not so complex as to discourage the operator. Similarly these conditions should obtain at each stage of a learning process if it is to be efficient. A tutor teaching one pupil seeks to maintain just these conditions.

Around 2000, it came to the attention of Csíkszentmihályi that the principles and practices of the Montessori Method of education seemed to purposefully set up continuous flow opportunities and experiences for students. Csíkszentmihályi and psychologist Kevin Rathunde embarked on a multi-year study of student experiences in Montessori settings and traditional educational settings. The research supported observations that students achieved flow experiences more frequently in Montessori settings.

=== Music ===
Musicians, especially improvisational soloists, may experience a state of flow while playing their instrument. Research has shown that performers in a flow state have a heightened quality of performance as opposed to when they are not in a flow state. In a study performed with professional classical pianists who played piano pieces several times to induce a flow state, a significant relationship was found between the flow state of the pianist and the pianist's heart rate, blood pressure, and major facial muscles. As the pianist entered the flow state, heart rate and blood pressure decreased, and the major facial muscles relaxed. This study further emphasized that flow is a state of effortless attention. In spite of the effortless attention and overall relaxation of the body, the performance of the pianist during the flow state improved.

Groups of drummers go through a state of flow when they sense a collective energy that drives the beat, something they refer to as getting into the groove or entrainment. Likewise, drummers and bass guitarists often describe a state of flow when they are feeling the downbeat together as being in the pocket. Researchers have measured flow through subscales; challenge-skill balance, merging of action and awareness, clear goals, unambiguous feedback, total concentration, sense of control, loss of self-consciousness, transformation of time and autotelic experience.

=== Sports ===
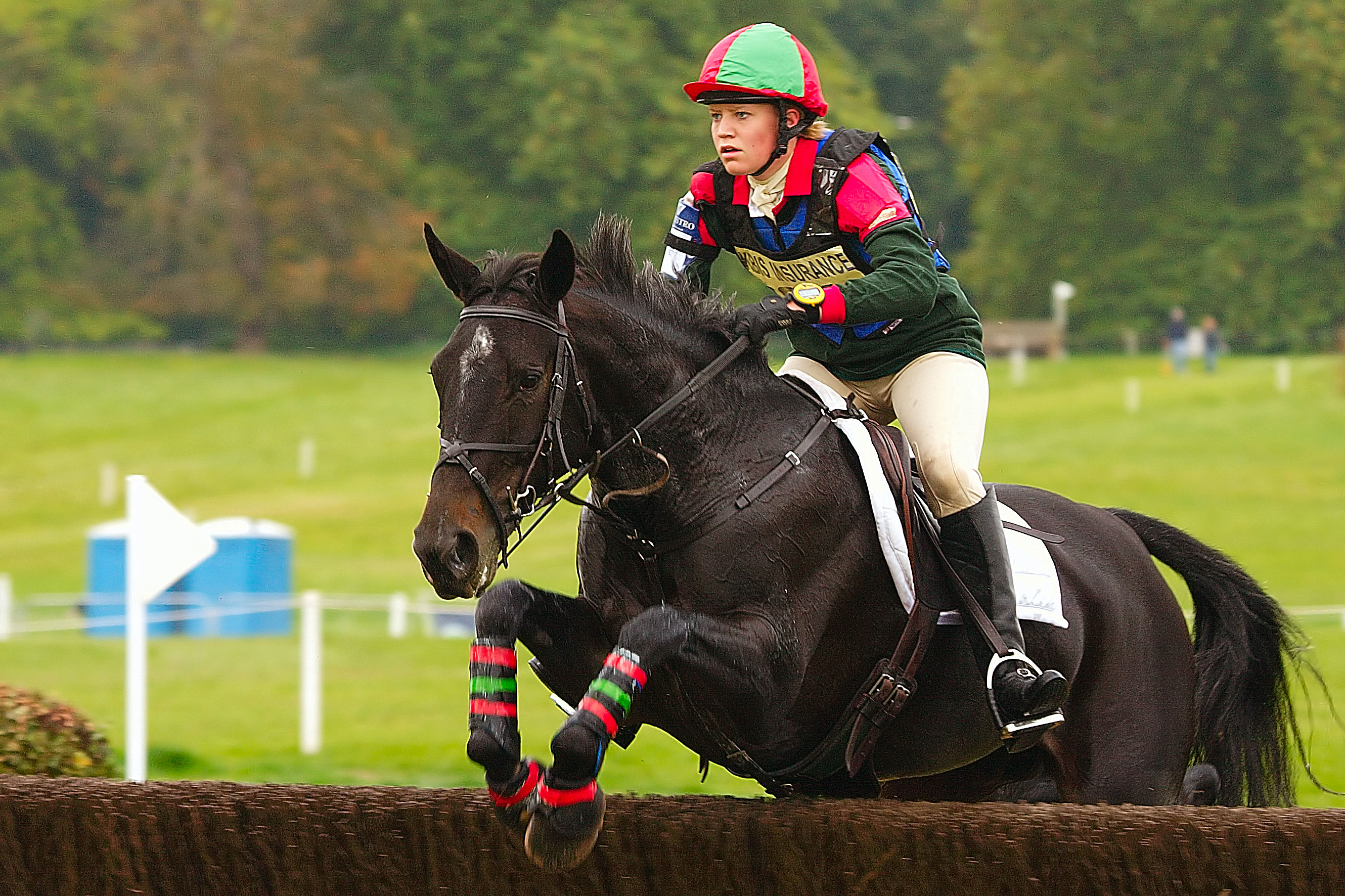
Flow may occur in challenging sports such as eventing.

The concept of being in the zone during an athletic performance fit within Csíkszentmihályi's description of the flow experience. Theories and applications of being in the zone and its relationship with an athletic competitive advantage are topics studied in the field of sport psychology. Flow experience has received considerable attention within sport psychology, with Jackson conducting qualitative research on the flow experience in elite athletes. Jackson co-authored with Csikszentmihalyi the book, Flow in Sports. In a qualitative study of NCAA Division I athletes on the experience of flow, 94% of the athletes described flow state as causing a merging of action and awareness, and that it was effortless and automatic.

Timothy Gallwey's influential works on the "inner game" of sports, such as golf and tennis, described the mental coaching and attitudes required to "get in the zone" and fully internalize mastery of the sport.

Roy Palmer suggests that "being in the zone" may also influence movement patterns as better integration of the conscious and subconscious reflex functions improves coordination. Many athletes describe the effortless nature of their performance while achieving personal bests.

Many martial arts such as Japanese budō contain aspects of psychological flow. Mixed martial arts champion and Karate master Lyoto Machida uses meditation techniques before fights to attain mushin, a concept that, by his description, is in all respects equal to flow.

Formula One driver Ayrton Senna, during qualifying for the 1988 Monaco Grand Prix, explained: "I was already on pole, [...] and I just kept going. Suddenly I was nearly two seconds faster than anybody else, including my team mate with the same car. And suddenly I realised that I was no longer driving the car consciously. I was driving it by a kind of instinct, only I was in a different dimension. It was like I was in a tunnel."

Former 500 GP rider Wayne Gardner talking about his victory at the 1990 Australian Grand Prix on The Unrideables 2 documentary said: "During these last five laps I had this sort of above body experience where actually raised up above and I could see myself racing. It was kind of a remote control and it's the weirdest thing I've ever had in my life. [...]" After the race Mick [Doohan] and in fact Wayne Rainey said: "How the hell did you do that?" and I said: "I have no idea."

=== Religion and spirituality ===
In yogic traditions such as Raja Yoga, reference is made to a state of flow in the practice of Samyama, a psychological absorption in the object of meditation.

=== Games and gaming ===
Flow in games and gaming has been linked to the laws of learning as a part of the explanation for why learning-games (the use of games to introduce material, improve understanding, or increase retention) have the potential to be effective. In particular, flow is intrinsically motivating, which is a part of the law of readiness. The condition of feedback, required for flow, is associated with the feedback aspects of the law of exercise. This is exhibited in well designed games, in particular, where players perform at the edge of their competency as they are guided by clear goals and feedback. The positive emotions associated with flow are associated with the law of effect. The intense experiences of being in a state of flow are directly associated with the law of intensity. Thus, the experience of gaming can be so engaging and motivating as it meets many of the laws of learning, which are inextricably connected to creating flow.

In games often much can be achieved thematically through an imbalance between challenge level and skill level. Horror games often keep challenges significantly above the player's level of competency in order to foster a continual feeling of anxiety. Conversely, so called "relaxation games" keep the level of challenges significantly below the player's competency level, in order to achieve an opposite effect. The video game Flow was designed as part of Jenova Chen's master's thesis for exploring the design decisions that allow players to achieve the flow state, by adjusting the difficulty dynamically during play.

It improves performance; calling the phenomenon "TV trance," a 1981 BYTE article discussed how "the best seem to enter a trance where they play but don't pay attention to the details of the game." The primary goal of games is to create entertainment through intrinsic motivation, which is related to flow; that is, without intrinsic motivation it is virtually impossible to establish flow. Through the balance of skill and challenge, the player's brain is aroused, with attention engaged and motivation high. Thus, the use of flow in games helps foster an enjoyable experience, which in turn increases motivation and draws players to continue playing. As such, game designers strive to integrate flow principles into their projects. Overall, the experience of play is fluid and is intrinsically psychologically rewarding independent of scores or in-game successes in the flow state.

=== Pain modulation ===
Flow has recently been discussed as a psychological state potentially associated with modulation of pain perception, with emerging conceptual frameworks suggesting a possible reduction in pain during states of deep task engagement. This phenomenon, referred to as flow-induced analgesia, highlights the role of cognitive-emotional processes in central pain modulation.

=== Design of intrinsically motivated computer systems ===
A simplified modification to flow has been combined with the technology acceptance model (TAM) to help guide the design of and explain the adoption of intrinsically motivated computer systems. This model, the hedonic-motivation system adoption model (HMSAM) is modelled to improve the understanding of hedonic-motivation systems (HMS) adoption. HMS are systems used primarily to fulfill users' intrinsic motivations, such for online gaming, virtual worlds, online shopping, learning/education, online dating, digital music repositories, social networking, online pornography, gamified systems, and for general gamification. Instead of a minor, TAM extension, HMSAM is an HMS-specific system acceptance model based on an alternative theoretical perspective, which is in turn grounded in flow-based concept of cognitive absorption (CA). The HMSAM further builds on van der Heijden's (2004) model of hedonic system adoption by including CA as a key mediator of perceived ease of use (PEOU) and of behavioral intentions to use (BIU) hedonic-motivation systems. Typically, models simplistically represent "intrinsic motivations" by mere perceived enjoyed. Instead, HMSAM uses the more complex, rich construct of CA, which includes joy, control, curiosity, focused immersion, and temporal dissociation. CA is a construct grounded in the seminal flow literature, yet CA has traditionally been used as a static construct, as if all five of its subconstructs occur at the same time—in direct contradiction to the flow literature. Thus, part of HMSAM's contribution is to return CA closer to its flow roots by re-ordering these CA subconstructs into more natural process-variance order as predicted by flow. Empirical data collection along with mediation tests further support this modeling approach.

=== Workplace ===
Conditions of flow, defined as a state in which challenges and skills are equally matched, play an important role in the workplace. Because flow is associated with achievement, its development may have specific implications for increased workplace satisfaction and achievement. Flow researchers, such as Csikszentmihályi, believe that certain interventions may be performed to enhance and increase flow in the workplace, through which people would gain 'intrinsic rewards that encourage persistence" and provide benefits. In his consultation work, Csikszentmihályi emphasizes finding activities and environments that are conducive to flow, and then identifying and developing personal characteristics to increase experiences of flow. Applying these methods in the workplace can improve morale by fostering a sense of greater happiness and accomplishment, which may be correlated with increased performance. In his review of Mihály Csikszentmihályi's book "Good Business: Leadership, Flow, and the Making of Meaning," Coert Visser introduces the ideas presented by Csikszentmihályi, including "good work" in which one "enjoys doing your best while at the same time contributing to something beyond yourself." He then provides tools by which managers and employees can create an atmosphere that encourages good work. Some consultants suggest that the experience sampling form (EMS) method be used for individuals and teams in the workplace in order to identify how time is currently being spent, and where focus should be redirected to in order to maximize flow experiences.

In order to achieve flow, Csikszentmihályi lays out the following three conditions:

- Goals are clear
- Feedback is immediate
- A balance exists between opportunity and capacity

Csikszentmihályi argues that with increased experiences of flow, people experience "growth towards complexity". People flourish as their achievements grow and with that comes development of increasing "emotional, cognitive, and social complexity." Creating a workplace atmosphere that allows for flow and growth, Csikszentmihályi argues, can increase the happiness and achievement of employees. An increasingly popular way of promoting greater flow in the workplace is using the "serious play" facilitation methods.

=== Implications ===
In the study "Predicting flow at work: Investigating the activities and job characteristics that predict flow states at work", Karina Nielsen and Bryan Cleal used a 9-item flow scale to examine predictors of flow at two levels: activity level (such as brainstorming, problem solving, and evaluation) and at a more stable level (such as role clarity, influence, and cognitive demands). They found that activities such as planning, problem solving, and evaluation predicted transient flow states, but that more stable job characteristics were not found to predict flow at work. This study can help us identify which task at work can be cultivated and emphasized in order to help employees experience flow on the job. In her article in Positive Psychology News Daily, Kathryn Britton examines the importance of experiencing flow in the workplace beyond the individual benefits it creates. She writes, "Flow isn't just valuable to individuals; it also contributes to organizational goals. For example, frequent experiences of flow at work lead to higher productivity, innovation, and employee development (Csikszentmihályi, 1991, 2004). So finding ways to increase the frequency of flow experiences can be one way for people to work together to increase the effectiveness of their workplaces."

== Effects ==
Books by Csikszentmihályi suggest that enhancing the time spent in flow makes our lives more happy and successful. Flow experiences are predicted to lead to positive affect as well as to better performance. For example, delinquent behavior was reduced in adolescents after two years of enhancing flow through activities.

People who have experienced flow, describe the following feeling:

1. Completely involved in what we are doing – focused, concentrated.
2. A sense of ecstasy – of being outside everyday reality.
3. Great inner clarity – knowing what needs to be done, and how well we are doing.
4. Knowing that the activity is doable – that our skills are adequate to the task.
5. A sense of serenity – no worries about oneself, and a feeling of growing beyond the boundaries of the ego.
6. Timelessness – thoroughly focused on the present, hours seem to pass by the minute.
7. Intrinsic motivation – whatever produces flow becomes its own reward.

However, further empirical evidence is required to substantiate these preliminary indications, as flow researchers continue to explore the problem of how to directly investigate causal consequences of flow experiences using modern scientific instrumentation to observe the neuro-physiological correlates of the flow state.

=== Satisfaction ===
Flow is an innately positive experience known to "produce intense feelings of enjoyment". An experience that is so enjoyable should lead to positive affect and happiness in the long run. Also, Csikszentmihályi stated that happiness is derived from personal development and growth– and flow situations permit the experience of personal development.

Several studies found that flow experiences and positive affect go hand in hand, and that challenges and skills above the individual's average foster positive affect. However, the causal processes underlying those relationships remain unclear at present.

=== Performance and learning ===
Flow experiences imply a growth principle. When one is in a flow state, they are working to master the activity at hand. To maintain that flow state, one must seek increasingly greater challenges. Attempting these new, difficult challenges stretches one's skills. One emerges from such a flow experience with a bit of personal growth and great "feelings of competence and efficacy". By increasing time spent in flow, intrinsic motivation and self-directed learning also increases.

Flow has a documented correlation with high performance in the fields of artistic and scientific creativity, teaching, learning, and sports; Looking at the sports side of being in a Flow State to help in learning different techniques, there has been research conducted by Alexandria University, Alexandria, Egypt. Their research revolved around tennis and field hockey players, specifically 24 students who are novices in the respective sports and were between the ages 19-20 years old. The experiment itself consisted of putting a group of students learning the sports through the process of mental training. The participants do this by watching the clips of athletes in slow motion. They did this over the course of 16 sessions with it being split in 8 sessions for each of the sports being tested. These sessions also lasted for 40 minutes 3 times a week, alternating sports every session. Overall the reliability of the experiment was shown to be very good. The results of the experiment also indicated that the participants were in fact able to perform at a higher level than if they didn't do the mental training/relaxation. Specifically looking at the forehand, backhand in tennis and push pass in field hockey, there was a spike in performance.

Flow has been linked to persistence and achievement in activities while also helping to lower anxiety during various activities and raise self-esteem. An article that was produced by José A. Domínguez-González, Rafael E. Reigal, Verónica Morales-Sánchez and Antonio Hernández-Mendo at the University of Málaga, in Spain show more benefits to using flow state in young football (soccer) players. The experiment was to show if there was a "correlation between sports psychological profile, competitive anxiety, self-confidence and the flow state." Their sample was 328 people that were split into 2 different groups. The first group contained 172 people and the second group contained 156 people. The mean ages of group 1 was 14.72 and 17.11 for group 2. The first group also had higher status in different leagues for certain sports while the second group had many lower league status. The experiment was questionnaire based and was used to determine whether there was a correlation between sports psychological profile, competitive anxiety, self-confidence and the flow state. The conclusion was that athletes with high skill had less anxiety and higher sports psychological profile, self-confidence and the flow state on average than the athletes in lower leagues of football(soccer). It also shows the positive correlation between psychological sports profile to self-confidence and the flow state. While also showing the negative correlation between competitive anxiety to psychological sports profile, self confidence, and the flow state.

However, evidence regarding better performance in flow situations is mixed. The association between the two is a reciprocal one. That is, flow experiences may foster better performance but, on the other hand, good performance makes flow experiences more likely. Results of a longitudinal study in the academic context indicate that the causal effect of flow on performance is only of small magnitude and the strong relationship between the two is driven by an effect of performance on flow. In the long run, flow experiences in a specific activity may lead to higher performance in that activity as flow is positively correlated with a higher subsequent motivation to perform and to perform well.

== Criticism ==
Csikszentmihályi writes about the dangers of flow himself:

...enjoyable activities that produce flow have a potentially negative effect: while they are capable of improving the quality of existence by creating order in the mind, they can become addictive, at which point the self becomes captive of a certain kind of order, and is then unwilling to cope with the ambiguities of life.

Further, he writes:

The flow experience, like everything else, is not "good" in an absolute sense. It is good only in that it has the potential to make life more rich, intense, and meaningful; it is good because it increases the strengths and complexity of the self. But whether the consequence of any particular instance of flow is good in a larger sense needs to be discussed and evaluated in terms of more inclusive social criteria.

Keller and Landhäußer (2012, p. 56) advocate for a flow intensity model because many models of flow have trouble predicting the intensity of flow experiences that can occur under various circumstances where skill and task demands fit together to produce flow.

Cowley et al. found that because self-reported flow happens after-the-fact, it does not really capture the aspect of flow that happens in the moment. Furthermore, that aspect of flow is prone to change, so the self-reported experience of flow cannot be trusted as much.

Cameron et al. found that there is not a lot of information on group flow, and this may be hindering development in managerial and theoretical contributions.

Goddard et al. found that interventions such as hypnosis, mindfulness, and imagery were found to be unsuccessful in stimulating flow experiences in individuals; however, these strategies were found to increase the state of flow.

Braxton Soderman's 2021 monograph Against Flow: Video Games and the Flowing Subject points out that flow exists on ideological grounds as an individualist counterpoint to socialism. Furthermore, the application of flow via gamification has brought work and play into ever closer relationship. Play is, therefore, converted into a form of unpaid labor.

Norsworthy et al. proposed a parsimonious model of three core dimensions of flow, reflecting the findings from the largest review on flow science to date, synthesising flow research across scientific disciplines and addressing conceptual criticisms of flow science regarding construct validity, theoretical compatibility, relational ambiguity, and definitional inconsistency. A new Psychological Flow Scale (PFS) to measure the core aspects of the flow state that could be utilized across domains and scientific disciplines was validated.

== Global-cultural perspectives ==
In a global context, there is a gap in understanding how flow manifests within various socio-cultural contexts. Cross-cultural comparative studies, as suggested by Engeser and Rheinberg (2008), could delve into how flow experiences differ across societies, deepening our understanding of the concept's universality or cultural specificity.

Longitudinal studies, capable of tracking flow experiences over extended periods, could offer insights into the sustained effects of flow on personal development, well-being, and performance. As Seligman and Csikszentmihalyi (2000) have suggested, such research could offer a more nuanced understanding of the concept's long-term impact.

== Technology ==
The impact of technological advancements on flow experiences represents another noteworthy research direction. As digital technology increasingly permeates our lives, exploring how immersive technologies such as virtual reality or augmented reality facilitate or hinder flow states could be an enlightening line of study. The potential of such research has been discussed by Csikszentmihalyi and Csikszentmihalyi (2014), emphasizing the need to understand how digital distractions may disrupt flow and how these effects could be mitigated. Another critical avenue for future research is the role of flow in online learning. The rise of digital education platforms, as discussed by Csíkszentmihályi and Nakamura (2018), necessitates investigations into how flow can be fostered in these contexts and how it might influence learning outcomes.

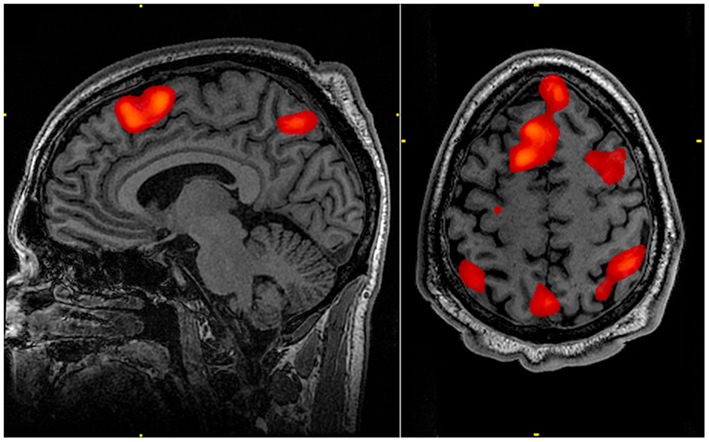
This specific FMRI scan determined which areas of the brain are activated during working memory tasks, but this type of imaging could also determine the areas of brain activated during flow experiences.

The neuroscientific underpinnings of flow are a developing field with significant potential. With advancements in neuroimaging technologies, as highlighted by Linden (2021), the opportunity to correlate psychological experiences of flow with their physiological counterparts becomes increasingly feasible.

=== Ethics ===
Additional research into how flow impacts ethical decision-making across professional fields could have extensive implications. An exploratory study by Nielsen and Cleal (2010) hints at the potential role of flow in influencing ethical judgments, suggesting the necessity of more extensive research in this domain.

=== Other areas of research ===
Cameron et al. proposed a research program that focuses on how group flow is different from individual flow, and how group flow affects group performance. These ideas will address some of the issues in group flow research such as poor data collection and interpretation. Sridhar & Lyngdoh suggested that research should investigate how mobility affects the ethical performance of sales professionals. Furthermore, there should be longitudinal studies done in various fields to understand the ethical implications of flow in sales.

== See also ==
- Absorption (psychology)
- Altered state of consciousness
- Boreout
- Hypnosis
- Hypomania
- Imagination
- Mindfulness
- Ovsiankina effect
- Peak experience
- Play
- Phenomenology (psychology)
- Prayer
- Procedural knowledge
- Samadhi
- Trance
- Narrative transportation
- Work as play
- Wu wei
