= Peter L. Benson =

American psychologist

- Born: Peter Lorimer Benson; May 2, 1946; Duluth, Minnesota
- Died: October 2, 2011 (aged 65); Minneapolis, Minnesota
- Education: University of Denver (PhD)
- Known for: Developmental assets
- Scientific career
- Fields: Developmental psychology, psychology of religion,
- Workplaces: Search Institute

Peter Lorimer Benson (1946–2011) was a psychologist and CEO/President of Search Institute. He pioneered the developmental assets framework, which became the predominant approach to research on positive facets of youth development. According to the American Psychologist,

When [Benson] introduced the developmental assets [approach] in 1989, the predominant approach to youth development was naming youth problems and trying to prevent them. In contrast, the assets approach focused on building strengths. The developmental assets framework became the predominant positive youth development approach in the world, cited more than 17,000 times, and the framework and surveys developed to measure the assets have been used with more than 3 million youths in more than 60 countries.

== Selected works ==
- Benson, Peter (2008). Sparks: How parents can help ignite the hidden strengths of teenagers. San Francisco: Jossey-Bass. ISBN 978-0-470-29404-8.
