= Mihaly Csikszentmihalyi =

Hungarian-American psychologist (1934–2021)

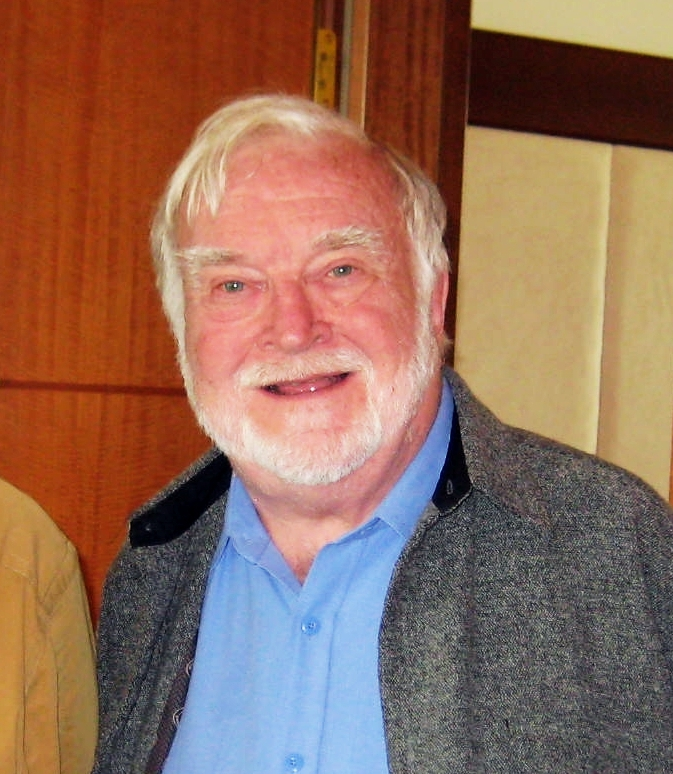
- Csikszentmihalyi in 2010
- Born: Csíkszentmihályi Mihály Róbert; 29 September 1934; Fiume, Kingdom of Italy
- Died: 20 October 2021 (aged 87); Claremont, California, US
- Education: University of Chicago (BA, PhD)
- Occupations: Psychologist, academic
- Known for: Flow (psychology); Positive psychology Autotelic activities
- Spouse: Isabella Selega (m. 1961)
- Children: 2, including Christopher
- Scientific career
- Fields: Psychology
- Workplaces: Claremont Graduate University; University of Chicago; Lake Forest College
- Thesis: Artistic problems and their solutions; an exploration of creativity in the arts. (1965)
- Doctoral advisor: Jacob W. Getzels
- Doctoral students: Keith Sawyer

Mihaly Robert Csikszentmihalyi (Note: Pronounced /ˈmiːhaɪ ˈtʃiːksɛntmiːˌhɑːjiː/ MEE-hy CHEEK-sent-mee-HAH-yee Hungarian: Csíkszentmihályi Mihály Róbert, pronounced [ˈt͡ʃiːksɛntmihaːji ˈmihaːj]) (29 September 1934 – 20 October 2021) was a Hungarian-American psychologist. He recognized and named the psychological concept of "flow", a highly focused mental state conducive to creativity. He was the Distinguished Professor of Psychology and Management at Claremont Graduate University. Earlier, he served as the head of the department of psychology at the University of Chicago and of the department of sociology and anthropology at Lake Forest College.

== Early life and education ==
Mihaly Robert Csikszentmihalyi was born on 29 September 1934 in Fiume, now Rijeka, then part of the Kingdom of Italy. His family name derives from the village of Csíkszentmihály in Transylvania. He was the third son of a career diplomat at the Hungarian consulate in Fiume. In 1944, when Csikszentmihalyi was ten years old, one of his two older half-brothers was killed in the Siege of Budapest, and the other, Moricz, was sent to Soviet labor camps in Siberia. Decades later, Mihaly and Moricz were reunited in Budapest.

His father was appointed Hungarian Ambassador to Italy shortly after the Second World War, moving the family to Rome. Csikszentmihalyi's father resigned in 1949, when the Hungarian People's Republic gained power; they responded by expelling his father and stripping the family of their Hungarian citizenship. To earn a living, his father opened a restaurant in Rome, and Csikszentmihalyi dropped out of school to help with the family income. At this time, the young Csikszentmihalyi, then travelling in Switzerland, saw Carl Jung give an oral presentation on the psychology of UFO sightings.

Csikszentmihalyi immigrated to the United States at age 22, working nights to support himself while studying at the University of Chicago. He received a B.A. in 1959 and a Ph.D. in 1965, both from the University of Chicago. He then taught at Lake Forest College before becoming a professor at the University of Chicago in 1969.

== Work ==
Csikszentmihalyi was noted for his work in the study of happiness and creativity, but is best known as the architect of the notion of flow and for his years of research and writing on the topic. Martin Seligman, former president of the American Psychological Association, described Csikszentmihalyi as the world's leading researcher on positive psychology. Csikszentmihalyi once said: "Repression is not the way to virtue. When people restrain themselves out of fear, their lives are by necessity diminished. Only through freely chosen discipline can life be enjoyed and still kept within the bounds of reason." His works are influential and are widely cited.

=== Flow ===
Mental state in terms of challenge level and skill level, according to Csikszentmihalyi's flow model. (Click on a fragment of the image to go to the appropriate article)

In his seminal work, Flow: The Psychology of Optimal Experience, Csíkszentmihályi outlined his theory that people are happiest when they are in a state of flow—a state of concentration or complete absorption with the activity at hand and the situation. It is a state in which people are so involved in an activity that nothing else seems to matter. The flow state is colloquially known as being in the zone or in the groove. It is an optimal state of intrinsic motivation, where the person is fully immersed in what they are doing. This is a feeling everyone has at times, characterized by a feeling of great absorption, engagement, fulfillment, and skill—and during which temporal concerns (time, food, ego-self, etc.) are typically ignored.

In an interview with Wired magazine, Csíkszentmihályi described flow as "being completely involved in an activity for its own sake. The ego falls away. Time flies. Every action, movement, and thought follows inevitably from the previous one, like playing jazz. Your whole being is involved, and you're using your skills to the utmost."

Csikszentmihályi characterized nine component states of achieving flow:

- challenge-skill balance
- merging of action and awareness
- clarity of goals
- immediate and unambiguous feedback
- concentration on the task at hand
- paradox of control
- transformation of time
- loss of self-consciousness

To achieve a flow state, a balance must be struck between the challenge of the task and the skill of the performer. If the task is too easy or too difficult, flow cannot occur as both skill level and challenge level must be matched and high; if skill and challenge are low and matched, apathy results.

=== Autotelicity ===
Csikszentmihalyi researched autotelic personalities. The autotelic personality is one in which a person performs acts because they are intrinsically rewarding, rather than to achieve external goals. Csikszentmihalyi described the autotelic personality as a trait possessed by people who can learn to enjoy situations that most others would find miserable. Research has shown that aspects associated with the autotelic personality include curiosity, persistence, and humility.

=== Motivation ===
Most of Csikszentmihalyi's final works focused on the idea of motivation and the factors that contribute to motivation, challenge, and overall success. One personality characteristic that Csikszentmihalyi researched in detail was that of intrinsic motivation. He and his colleagues found that intrinsically motivated people were more likely to be goal-directed and enjoy challenges that would lead to an increase in overall happiness.

Csikszentmihalyi identified intrinsic motivation as a powerful trait to optimize and enhance positive experience, feelings, and overall well-being as a result of challenging experiences. The results indicated a new personality construct, which he called work orientation, characterized by "achievement, endurance, cognitive structure, order, play, and low impulsivity". A high level of work orientation in students is said to be a better predictor of grades and fulfillment of long-term goals than any school or household environmental influence.

== Personal life ==
Csikszentmihalyi married Isabella Selega in 1961. He had two sons: Christopher Csíkszentmihályi, an artist and professor at Cornell University, and Mark Csikszentmihalyi, chair of the Department of East Asian Languages and Cultures at the University of California, Berkeley.

Csikszentmihalyi died on 20 October 2021 of cardiac arrest, at his home in Claremont, California, at the age of 87.

== Awards ==
In 2009, Csikszentmihalyi was awarded the Clifton Strengths Prize. He received the Széchenyi Prize at a ceremony in Budapest in 2011. He was awarded the Hungarian Order of Merit in 2014. He was a Fellow of the American Academy of Arts and Sciences, and a member of both the National Academy of Education and the Academy of Leisure Sciences.

== Commemoration ==
On 29 September 2023, Csikszentmihalyi's 89th birthday was remembered with a Google Doodle. The Just Dance character Mihaly is named after Csikszentmihalyi.

== Publications ==
- Csikszentmihalyi, Mihaly (1975). Beyond Boredom and Anxiety: Experiencing Flow in Work and Play, San Francisco: Jossey-Bass. ISBN 0-87589-261-2
- Csikszentmihalyi, Mihaly (1978) "Intrinsic Rewards and Emergent Motivation" in The Hidden Costs of Reward: New Perspectives on the Psychology of Human Motivation eds Lepper, Mark R; Greene, David, Erlbaum: Hillsdale: N.Y. 205–216
- Csikszentmihalyi, Mihaly and Halton, Eugene (1981). The Meaning of Things: Domestic Symbols and the Self, Cambridge: Cambridge University Press. ISBN 0-521-28774-X
- Csikszentmihalyi, Mihaly and Larson, Reed (1984). Being Adolescent: Conflict and Growth in the Teenage Years. New York: Basic Books, Inc. ISBN 0-465-00646-9
- Csikszentmihalyi, Mihaly and Csikszentmihalyi, Isabella Selega, eds. (1988). Optimal Experience: Psychological studies of flow in consciousness, Cambridge: Cambridge University Press. ISBN 0-521-34288-0
- Csikszentmihalyi, Mihaly (1990). Flow: The Psychology of Optimal Experience. New York: Harper and Row. ISBN 0-06-092043-2
- Csikszentmihalyi, Mihaly (1994). The Evolving Self, New York: Harper Perennial. ISBN 0-06-092192-7
- Csikszentmihalyi, Mihaly (1996). Creativity: Flow and the Psychology of Discovery and Invention. New York: Harper Perennial. ISBN 0-06-092820-4
- Csikszentmihalyi, Mihaly (1998). Finding Flow: The Psychology of Engagement With Everyday Life. Basic Books. ISBN 0-465-02411-4
- Gardner, Howard, Csikszentmihalyi, Mihaly, and Damon, William (2001). Good Work: When Excellence and Ethics Meet. New York, Basic Books. ISBN 0-465-02608-7
- Csikszentmihalyi, Mihaly (2003). Good Business: Leadership, Flow, and the Making of Meaning. Basic Books, Inc. ISBN 0-142-00409-X
- Csikszentmihalyi, Mihaly (2014). The Systems Model of Creativity: The Collected Works of Mihaly Csikszentmihalyi. Dordrecht: Springer, 2014. ISBN 978-94-017-9084-0
- Csikszentmihalyi, Mihaly (2014). Flow and the Foundations of Positive Psychology: The Collected Works of Mihaly Csikszentmihalyi. Dordrecht: Springer, 2014. ISBN 978-94-017-9087-1
- Csikszentmihalyi, Mihaly (2014). Applications of Flow in Human Development and Education: The Collected Works of Mihaly Csikszentmihalyi. Dordrecht: Springer, 2014. ISBN 978-94-017-9093-2

== See also ==
- Attention
- Cognitive science
- Experience sampling method
- John Neulinger
