= RTMark =

Anti-consumerist activist collective

RTMark /ˈɑːrtmɑːrk/ (stylized as ®™ark) is an anti-consumerist activist collective, whose stated aim is to subvert the "Corporate Shield" that "protects" American corporations. The name is derived from "Registered Trademark".

RTMark is itself a registered corporation which brings together activists who plan projects with donors who fund them. It thus operates outside the laws governing human individuals, and benefits from the much looser laws governing corporations.

RTMark claimed as its first prank the "Barbie Liberation Organization", in which the voiceboxes of talking Barbie and G.I. Joe toys were swapped, and the toys then returned to the store (1993). The first prank documentable as being truly RTMark-sponsored was the SimCopter "hack" (1996), carried out by founding member Jacques Servin

Other RTMark stunts were gwbush.com (a faked campaign Website for George W. Bush). They were also involved in the toywar and they brokered a deal so James Baumgartner, the original inventor of voteauction could sell the raw project to UBERMORGEN in Austria.

The group's website was part of the Whitney Biennial in 2000.

== See also ==
- Decadent Action
- Jacques Servin
- Igor Vamos
- The Yes Men
