= The Yes Men (film) =

- Theatrical release poster
- Directed by: Dan Ollman; Sarah Price; Chris Smith
- Produced by: Sarah Price; Doug Ruschhaupt; Randy Russell; Chris Smith
- Starring: Mike Bonanno; Andy Bichlbaum
- Edited by: Dan Ollman
- Music by: Jon Solomon
- Production companies: Free Speech, LLC
- Distributed by: United Artists (through MGM Distribution Co.)
- Release dates: September 7, 2003 (TIFF); September 24, 2004 (United States)
- Running time: 83 minutes
- Country: United States
- Language: English

The Yes Men is a 2003 American documentary film about the early culture jamming exploits of The Yes Men.

The film revolves around "The Yes Men" — two anti-globalization activists, under the aliases Andy Bichlbaum and Mike Bonanno — who impersonate spokespeople for the WTO and affiliated corporations in order to secretly lampoon and satirize these organizations with elaborate ruses and fraudulent announcements of ridiculous corporate decisions, in front of live, unsuspecting audiences (usually comprising businesspeople, university student bodies, and the press). The film details the two activists' involvement in hoaxes targeting SimCopter, the 2000 G. W. Bush presidential campaign, McDonald's, and, most prominently, the WTO. The film also includes brief interviews with Michael Moore and Greg Palast.

The film premiered at the 28th Toronto International Film Festival in 2003. It was also shown as part of a special screening at the 2004 Sundance Film Festival. The film received generally positive reviews from critics. It is followed by a sequel, The Yes Men Fix the World.

== Reception ==
On the review aggregator website Rotten Tomatoes, 87% of 83 critics' reviews are positive, with an average rating of 7.1/10. The website's consensus reads: "Shining a spotlight on activists as unorthodox as they are entertaining, The Yes Men proves advocating for social change can be seriously funny." Metacritic, which uses a weighted average, assigned the film a score of 68 out of 100, based on 26 critics, indicating "generally favorable" reviews.

Peter Travers of Rolling Stone gave it 3 out of 5 stars and called the film "Subversive and diabolically funny." Roger Ebert of the Chicago Sun-Times gave it 3 out of 4 stars, and wrote: "Amazing in what it shows, but underwhelming in what it does with it."
