= Lisa vs. Malibu Stacy =

- The Simpsons episode
- Lisa grows frustrated at the sexism displayed by Malibu Stacy dolls.
- Episode no.: Season 5 Episode 14
- Directed by: Jeff Lynch
- Written by: Bill Oakley & Josh Weinstein
- Production code: 1F12
- Original air date: February 17, 1994

Guest appearance
- Kathleen Turner as Stacy Lovell

Episode features
- Couch gag: The family gets crushed by the foot from Monty Python's Flying Circus.
- Commentary: Matt Groening; David Mirkin; Bill Oakley; Josh Weinstein; David Silverman

Episode chronology
← Previous "Homer and Apu"	Next → "Deep Space Homer"
- The Simpsons season 5

"Lisa vs. Malibu Stacy" is the fourteenth episode of the fifth season of the American animated television series The Simpsons, and the 95th episode overall. It originally aired on the Fox network in the United States on February 17, 1994. Lisa challenges the Malibu Stacy dollmakers to make a less sexist doll. With Malibu Stacy's original creator, Stacy Lovell, Lisa creates the doll Lisa Lionheart to positively influence young girls.

The episode was written by Bill Oakley and Josh Weinstein, and directed by Jeffrey Lynch. Its plot was inspired by the Teen Talk Barbie doll, which "spoke" short phrases stereotypical of a middle-class American teenager. Kathleen Turner guest stars as Lovell.

The episode has received mostly positive critical reviews. It acquired a Nielsen rating of 11.6, and was the second-highest-rated show on the Fox network the week it aired.

== Plot ==
Grampa decides to give the Simpson family their inheritance early, which the family chooses to spend on a trip to the mall. During the entire trip to the mall and back home, Grampa tells far-fetched stories and spouts useless advice, making the family shun him. At the mall, Lisa eagerly buys the new talking Malibu Stacy doll, but is disappointed when the doll utters sexist phrases such as "Thinking too much gives you wrinkles" and "Don't ask me, I'm just a girl." After Lisa and Grampa bemoan how they are treated because of their respective ages, they decide to change: Grampa will get a job and Lisa will find Malibu Stacy's creator, Stacy Lovell, and convince her to come out of retirement.

Grampa struggles with his new job at Krusty Burger, suffering a war flashback at the drive-thru and losing his false teeth after a prank on a coworker goes wrong. He soon quits after realizing he misses complaining with his fellow seniors.

Waylon Smithers, who owns the world's largest collection of Malibu Stacy merchandise, helps Lisa find Lovell. Lovell has become a jaded alcoholic recluse in the twenty years since she was forced out of her own company, but is reinvigorated when Lisa proposes a new talking doll, Lisa Lionheart, to counteract the talking Malibu Stacy. The doll, designed to look more realistic than Malibu Stacy, says inspirational and encouraging phrases for girls to hear instead, voiced by Lisa herself. However, the Malibu Stacy executives learn of its development and worry that it poses a threat to their sales.

After a slow initial release, Lisa Lionheart suddenly gains popularity among Malibu Stacy fans after being featured in Kent Brockman's news show at the behest of his daughter. As Springfield's little girls – along with Smithers – rush to the mall to buy Lisa Lionheart, a cart of Malibu Stacy dolls with new hats is wheeled into their path. Though Lisa protests at the cheap reissues of Malibu Stacy dolls, the girls and Smithers ransack the cart regardless. However, one little girl selects a Lisa Lionheart doll, which gives Lisa hope for her brand, though Lovell quietly remarks that the production of Lisa Lionheart cost $46,000.

== Production ==
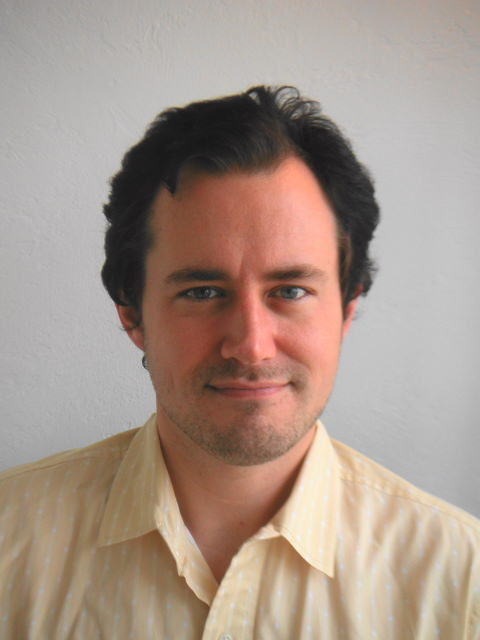
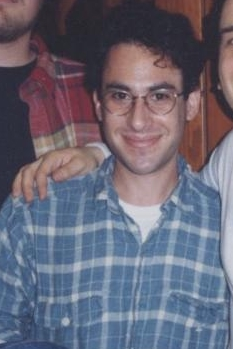
Bill Oakley (left) and Josh Weinstein (right) were co-writers for this episode.

The episode was written by Bill Oakley and Josh Weinstein, and directed by Jeffrey Lynch. Before the episode aired, Malibu Stacy had already appeared many times on the show as one of Lisa's dolls. The staff were trying to come up with an idea for an episode by going through the companies in the Simpsons universe, and Oakley suggested an episode involving the Malibu Stacy company. The plot of the episode was inspired by the Teen Talk Barbie talking doll that caused controversy in the United States in the early 1990s. (Note: In July 1992, Mattel released Teen Talk Barbie, which spoke a number of phrases including "Will we ever have enough clothes?", "I love shopping!", and "Wanna have a pizza party?" Each doll was programmed to say four out of 270 possible phrases, so that there were over 200 million combinations. One of these phrases was "Math class is tough!" Although only about 1.5% of all the dolls sold said the phrase, it led to criticism from the American Association of University Women because they regarded it as demeaning to women. In October 1992, Mattel announced that Teen Talk Barbie would no longer say the phrase, and offered a swap to anyone who owned a doll that did.)

Oakley and Weinstein decided to include Abe in the episode because they had an "obsession" with old people. Weinstein said they both "love them and seem to really hate them" at the same time. He also said that they enjoy writing for characters such as Abe and Mr. Burns because of their "out-datedness", and because he and Oakley get to use dictionaries for looking up "old time slang". Executive producer David Mirkin thought it was difficult to make Abe funny because he is a "boring and tedious" character. He thinks that even though "Abe's doing all these complaints, what makes him funny is that the things he says are actually funny in the context of the boring and tedium." Mirkin thought this was a "big challenge, and Bill and Josh pulled it off very well."

The cast first rehearsed "Lisa vs. Malibu Stacy" on July 15, 1993. When the episode was in production, Oakley's wife Rachel Pulido was an enthusiastic Barbie collector. Oakley therefore spent a lot of time going to Barbie conventions across the United States and met many different collectors. At one convention, Oakley met the man who owned the world's largest Barbie collection. The meeting between the two inspired the part of the episode where Lisa visits Smithers and it is revealed that Smithers is the owner of the world's largest Malibu Stacy collection.

Kathleen Turner guest starred in the episode as Stacy Lovell. Mirkin had wanted to cast her in the role, but she asked to see a script before agreeing to the part. Turner later stated she "loved" the episode, stating "her skepticism, her cynicism, and then being converted, being compelled by the girl... It was just deliciously funny. And sad." Mirkin thought Turner was "completely game" when she showed up at the recording studio to record her lines as she "nailed" her lines really fast. He added that he enjoyed directing her and he thought she had one of the best performances ever on The Simpsons.

== Cultural references ==
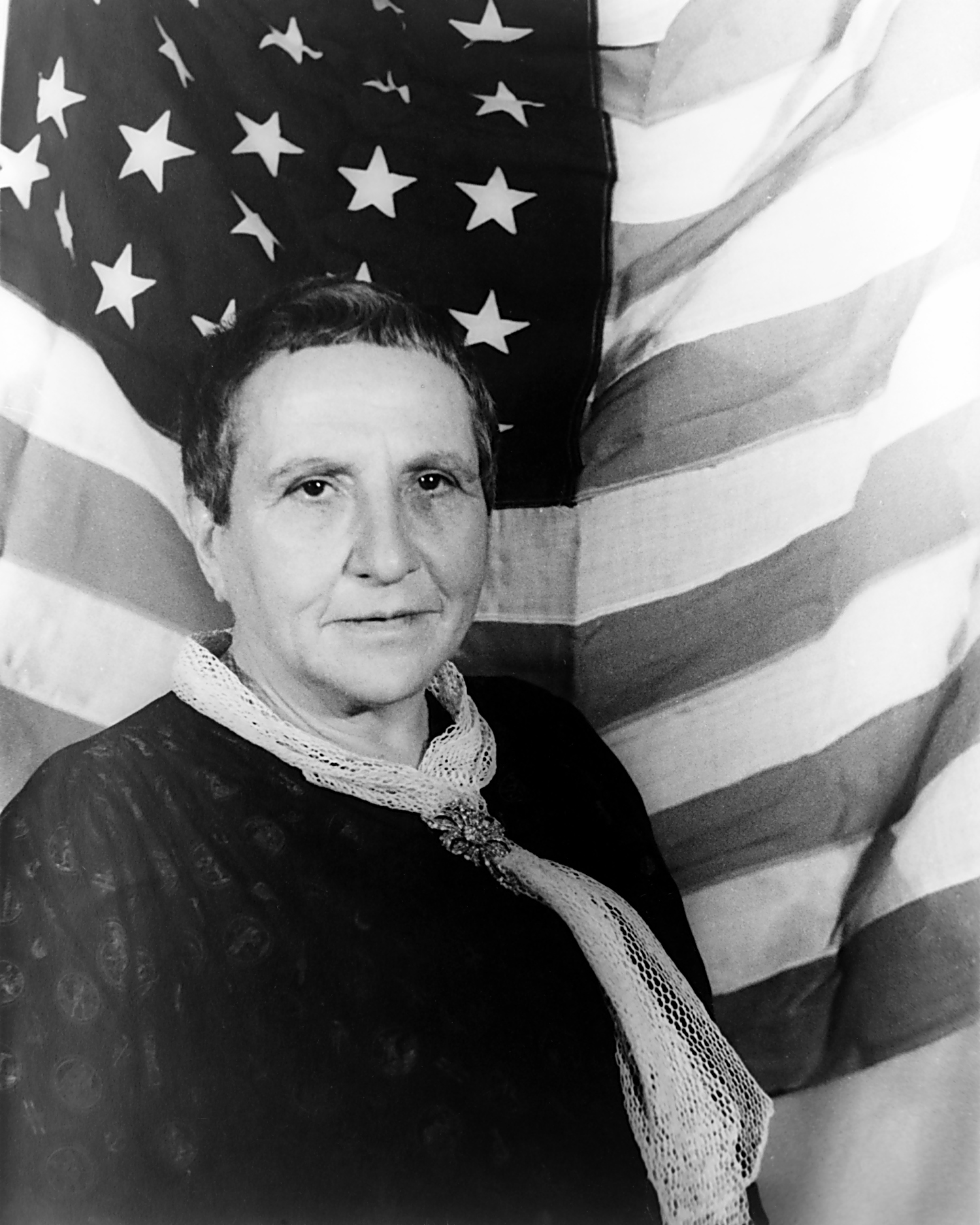
Lisa wants her doll Lisa Lionheart to have the wisdom of American writer Gertrude Stein.

At the beginning of the episode, Abe watches his idol Ben Matlock – a character from the NBC/ABC television series Matlock, played by Andy Griffith – talk to a crowd of excited seniors at the Grand Opening of the Center for Geriatric Medicine. The crowd cheers for Matlock by singing a version of "We Love You, Conrad" from the musical Bye Bye Birdie. Homer dances on giant piano keys recessed in the floor of the toy store, spoofing a scene from the 1988 film Big. The doll section of the store is called "Valley of the Dolls", a reference to the novel by Jacqueline Susann. Lisa wants Lisa Lionheart to have "the wisdom of Gertrude Stein, the wit of Cathy Guisewite, the tenacity of Nina Totenberg, the common sense of Elizabeth Cady Stanton, and the down-to-earth good looks of Eleanor Roosevelt."

Stacy Lovell's list of husbands features the action figures Ken, Johnny West, G.I. Joe, Doctor Colossus, and Steve Austin. Lisa's story about the Malibu Stacy doll saying phrases that are considered demeaning to women is based on the Teen Talk Barbie line of dolls and how they caused controversy. During one scene in the episode, one girl's Malibu Stacy doll says "My Spidey Sense is tingling! Anyone call for a web-slinger?", a reference to a practical joke by the Barbie Liberation Organization in the early 1990s in which the voiceboxes of talking Barbie and G.I. Joe toys were swapped.

== Reception ==
In its original broadcast, "Lisa vs. Malibu Stacy" finished 23rd in the ratings for the week of February 14–20, 1994, with a Nielsen rating of 11.6, equivalent to 11 million viewing households. It was the second highest-rated show on the Fox network that week, following Beverly Hills, 90210.

Since airing, the episode has received mostly positive reviews from television critics. DVD Movie Guide's Colin Jacobson thought the episode was "good but not great", despite "more than a few strong moments, like the hilarious shot of Bart at the gay rights parade." He added that "most years this would be an A-list program, but it’s one of season five’s lesser lights despite a generally high level of quality." The authors of the book I Can't Believe It's a Bigger and Better Updated Unofficial Simpsons Guide, Gary Russell and Gareth Roberts, described the episode as "Lisa at her crusading best, Homer at his stupidest and Abe getting all the best lines again, especially at Krusty Burgers. Kathleen Turner's spot as the real Malibu Stacy is superb."

Janica Lockhart of The Easterner called the episode a "classic" and added: "The episode takes on misogynist views, but in a humorous way, that only The Simpsons can master." Patrick Bromley of DVD Verdict gave the episode a grade of A. DVD Talk's Bill Gibron gave it a score of 5 out of 5.

The episode is one of Oakley and Weinstein's favorites from their time as writers on the show. When The Simpsons began streaming on Disney+ in 2019, Oakley named this one of the best classic Simpsons episodes to watch on the service. One of Mirkin's favorite jokes on the show is the scene in this episode where Abe cycles down the street, shouting "Look at me, I'm acting young!" before Lisa's Malibu Stacy doll catches the front wheel of the bike, sending Abe flying into an open grave.

In the book The Simpsons and Philosophy: The D'oh! of Homer, Aeon J. Skoble cited the episode as an example in his piece titled: "Do We Admire or Laugh at Lisa?" He wrote: "The fact that the less intellectual doll is vastly preferred over Lisa's doll, even though Lisa's objections are reasonable, demonstrates the ways in which reasonable ideas can be made to take a back seat to having fun and going with the flow. This debate is often played out in the real world, of course: Barbie is the subject of perennial criticism along the lines of Lisa's critique of Malibu Stacy, yet remains immensely popular, and in general, we often see intellectual critiques of toys dismissed as 'out of touch' or elitist."
