= Streets of SimCity =

1997 video game

- Developer: Maxis
- Publishers: NA: Maxis; EU: Electronic Arts
- Designers: Jason Shankel; Mike Perry
- Artist: Shannon Galvin
- Composer: Jerry Martin
- Series: SimCity
- Platform: Windows
- Release: NA: November 4, 1997; EU: 1997
- Genres: Racing, vehicular combat
- Modes: Single-player, multiplayer

Streets of SimCity is a 1997 racing and vehicular combat video game published by Maxis and Electronic Arts for Microsoft Windows. The game features the ability to visit any city created in SimCity 2000, as well as a network mode allowing for players to compete in races with up to seven other players. The game was developed to build upon the engine and graphical fidelity of SimCopter, a title with a similar premise of navigating SimCity cities. It is the last Maxis game to be developed without supervision by Electronic Arts, which acquired Maxis in the months leading up to release.

Upon release, Streets of SimCity received negative reviews, with critics considering the game's concept interesting, but found its execution and gameplay lackluster and noted it suffered from performance issues. It has been retrospectively viewed as the nadir of the SimCity series, and representative of a number of less commercially and critically successful spin-off titles by Maxis up to the period of their acquisition by EA.

== Gameplay ==
Driving from a first-person perspective, showing the dashboard and map.

Streets of SimCity represents city streets in a 3D environment in which players can navigate vehicles freely or complete missions. The layout of these cities is interpreted from files from Sim City 2000, which can be imported by players into the game; 50 custom cities are preinstalled. It is also packaged with the SimCity 2000 Urban Renewal Kit, allowing players to create or modify cities. Players can select one of five vehicles to drive, including a VW Bug styled car, a sports car, and a utility van. Missions are played in a Career mode over 30 "episodes" in five campaigns, in which players assume the role of a television star performing vehicular stunts in different shows. Mission objectives may include racing against opponents, delivering packages to a target location in the city, and evading pursuing vehicles. In between episodes, players can repair their vehicles, which can be customised with modifications, including machine guns, missile launchers, mines and armour. Custom upgrades are purchased from money earned from completing missions. Vehicles can be driven using a first person perspective within the dashboard, allowing players to read a map and radar depicting nearby vehicles. Streets of SimCity also features a multiplayer mode in which up to eight players can battle in a deathmatch-style race over a network.

== Development ==
Streets of SimCity was developed by Maxis as one of several spin-offs of the SimCity series following the release of SimCity 2000. It was created by Maxis during a period of acquisition by publisher Electronic Arts and a restructuring of the company. The game was developed using the same 3D engine as SimCopter, a 1996 title that expanded the SimCity franchise by allowing players to fly through their city. The game's lead designer was Jason Shankel, a programmer who had worked for Maxis for two years and led development of the SimCity 2000 Urban Renewal Kit add-on and Network Edition. Shankel built on the engine to support 3D acceleration, increase the resolution and remodel the buildings for greater detail. The developers used lessons learned from criticism of SimCopter to design the game, including more gameplay content and an editor so that players did not need to rely on ownership of SimCity 2000 to create and edit cities. In 1998, the game was packaged with other Maxis titles as part of the Ultimate Sim Series compilation.

== Reception ==
Reception

Review scores
Publication	Score
Computer Games Strategy Plus	1.5/5
GameSpot	4.4/10
Next Generation	1/5
PC Gamer (US)	37%
PC Games (US)	C
PC PowerPlay	30%
PCMag	1/5
APC	4/5

According to PC Gamer, Streets of SimCity sold 121,000 copies as of 2001.

The game received mostly negative reviews upon release, with many critics considering that whilst its concept had merit, its execution fell short as a standalone title; Next Generation wrote that whilst the concept of driving around cities from SimCity "sounds like a blast", the game "fails in practically every category". Most critics faulted the racing gameplay, with unfavorable comparisons to Interstate '76, a similar racing title. Gareth Jones of PC PowerPlay wrote that the game's driving was "unresponsive and nothing like real life", discussing the lack of a reverse pedal, and Jonah Falcon of Computer Games Strategy Plus dismissed its poor collision, handling with slopes, and AI, writing that "the computer AI is so awakward that computer cars get stuck in tunnels, blindly smashing themselves into the side wall over and over like psychotic robots".

Some reviewers felt Streets of SimCity had some entertainment value due to its integration with SimCity 2000, with Next Generation considering it the "only interesting feature" of the software. However, describing the game as an interpretation of SimCity "as it never existed", Peter Olafson of PC Games considered that it had detached from the series' focus on urban traffic in its focus on vehicular combat. Michael Ryan of GameSpot critiqued the game's maps, remarking that as they were imported from SimCity 2000, all streets were at angular right-hand turns, and ramps leading to bridges were too steep. The graphics of Streets of SimCity received a mixed reception: whilst some praised their visual fidelity, others noted the high system requirements had an impact on performance. Olafson praised the buildings as "lovely and seamlessly constructed" and suitably varied, but encountered sluggish performance and graphical bugs without 3Dfx settings enabled.

=== Retrospective reception ===
Retrospective reception of Streets of SimCity has been negative, with T. Liam McDonald of Boot writing the game had "no entertaining elements whatsoever", GameInformer considered the title was a "bizarre departure" for the franchise, and GameSpot labelling it as "one of Maxis' greatest follies". Both PC Zone and Hyper stated it was one of the worst of all time. Several critics also assessed that its implementation was janky, with Rock Paper Shotgun writing the game felt "sterile and broken". In Vintage Games, Loguidice & Barton stated it was considered the black sheep of the SimCity franchise due to its "poor collision detection, driving simulation and quality assurance". The title helped contribute to the poor reputation of spin-off games in the Maxis software lineup and SimCity series.

Some reception has been less critical: whilst PC Games wrote that Streets of SimCity was a "disaster in its own right" as a SimCity title, the game had some entertainment value as a driving game. Jim Vorel of The A.V. Club ranked the game as the fourth-best Maxis simulation title, writing that it was more satisfying than SimCopter as the "rendering of the cities is much better, and there's something simply relaxing about going for a cruise around the place you built". Schweizer considered that the use of urban landscapes to "allow players to race and crash in polygonal streets" was an early attempt to create a navigable 3D city that would anticipate future attempts such as the DMA Design title Grand Theft Auto.

== Legacy ==
Streets of SimCity was one of the last in a range of spin-off titles published by Maxis that met a poor critical and commercial reception during a period of acquisition by EA. The design of SimCopter and Streets of Simcity was initially influential to the direction of Maxis in developing a similar 3D approach for Sim City 3000, which was later abandoned for a 2D approach following acquisition by EA. SimCity 4: Rush Hour, an expansion pack to the 2003 title SimCity 4, later introduced features allowing players to drive a vehicle through the streets of their city.

In 2019, independent developer Alxander Krimsky published a patched version of Streets of SimCity for Windows 10 named SimStreetsX. The version, which rewrote the assembly code for the game, allows for networked multiplayer play for eight players. Krimsky developed the version in a week and stated its creation was straightforward, having prior released a similar reimplementation for SimCopter in the same engine.
