= The Yes Men Are Revolting =

- Film poster
- Directed by: Laura Nix; Jacques Servin; Igor Vamos
- Produced by: Laura Nix; Jacques Servin; Igor Vamos
- Cinematography: Keil Troisi; Raul Barcelona; Martin Boudot; Christopher Clements; Brandon Jourdan; Laura Nix; Sam Spreckley
- Edited by: Geraud Brisson; Claire L. Chandler; Soren B. Ebbe
- Music by: Didier Leplae; Joe Wong
- Production companies: Human Race; Felt Films; Chili Film; Motto Pictures; Pieter van Huystee Film; Renegad Pictures; Senorita Films
- Distributed by: The Orchard
- Release date: September 5, 2014 (TIFF)
- Running time: 91 minutes
- Countries: Denmark; France; Germany
- Language: English
- Box office: $50,190

The Yes Men Are Revolting is a 2014 documentary film directed by Laura Nix and The Yes Men, a culture jamming duo who use the aliases Andy Bichlbaum and Mike Bonanno. Adam McKay executive produced. The film follows their exploits as they prank various organizations and corporations who engage in climate change denial.

== Plot ==
The Yes Men are a culture jamming group that use satirical performance art to make political points. While impersonating public relations personnel, they hold fake press conferences where they announce corporations, governments, and other organizations have taken a new, leftist stance. After seeing little gain from their pranks and increasing demands in their personal lives, The Yes Men debate whether they should continue. They are reinvigorated by the Occupy Wall Street protests and embark on a new campaign to combat climate change denial.

== Cast ==
- Jacques Servin (as Andy Bichlbaum)
- Igor Vamos (as Mike Bonanno)
- Benadette Chandia Kodili
- Gitz Crazyboy
- Tito Ybarra
- Mike Mathieu
- Leonid Vlassov

== Release ==
The Yes Men Are Revolting premiered at the 2014 Toronto International Film Festival. It was released theatrically on June 12, 2015, in the US and grossed $50,190.

== Reception ==
On the review aggregator website Rotten Tomatoes, 81% of 32 critics' reviews are positive, with an average rating of 6.3/10. Metacritic, which uses a weighted average, assigned the film a score of 61 out of 100, based on 13 critics, indicating "generally favorable" reviews.

Dennis Harvey of Variety called it "another entertaining mix of agitpop, pranksterism and autobiography". John DeFore of The Hollywood Reporter wrote that "the film presupposes a bit more interest in the pair's friendship and personal lives than many viewers will have". Sheri Linden of the Los Angeles Times wrote that "fans will find fewer of the elaborate deadpan stunts than they might have hoped for", but the ones included "highlight corporate greed and governmental shortsightedness as shrewdly as ever". Stephen Holden of The New York Times made it a NYT Critics' Pick and wrote that it "has a personal poignancy that is missing in the forerunners". Diana Clarke of The Village Voice wrote, "Their globetrotting easy conversation, nitpicking, and laughter despite anger and environmental upset create an unusual space for the viewer to do the same."

Michael O'Sullivan of The Washington Post rated it 3.5/5 stars and wrote, "Although this latest documentary is, in large part, simply more of the same stuff we saw in the earlier films, there’s also a lot of background material here about Servin and Vamos that makes this outing a bit more interesting." Mike D'Angelo of The A.V. Club wrote that The Yes Men "have overestimated public interest in what they do when they’re not posing as other people for the greater good". D'Angelo suggested that future personal anecdotes be put on DVD bonus material. Andrew Lapin of The Dissolve rated it 2/5 stars and wrote, "Considering the amount of padding on display over the course of 90 minutes, it's hard to tell why a third Yes Men film needed to be made at all, other than to burnish its stars' reputations." Oleg Ivanov of Slant Magazine rated it 3/4 stars and wrote that "their personal lives generate only moderate interest" but serve to illuminate their motivations. Rodrigo Perez of Indiewire rated it B and called it entertaining but "not nearly as imperative as the vital activism these guys have dedicated their lives to".
