= Ubermorgen =

Swiss-Austrian-American artist duo

UBERMORGEN
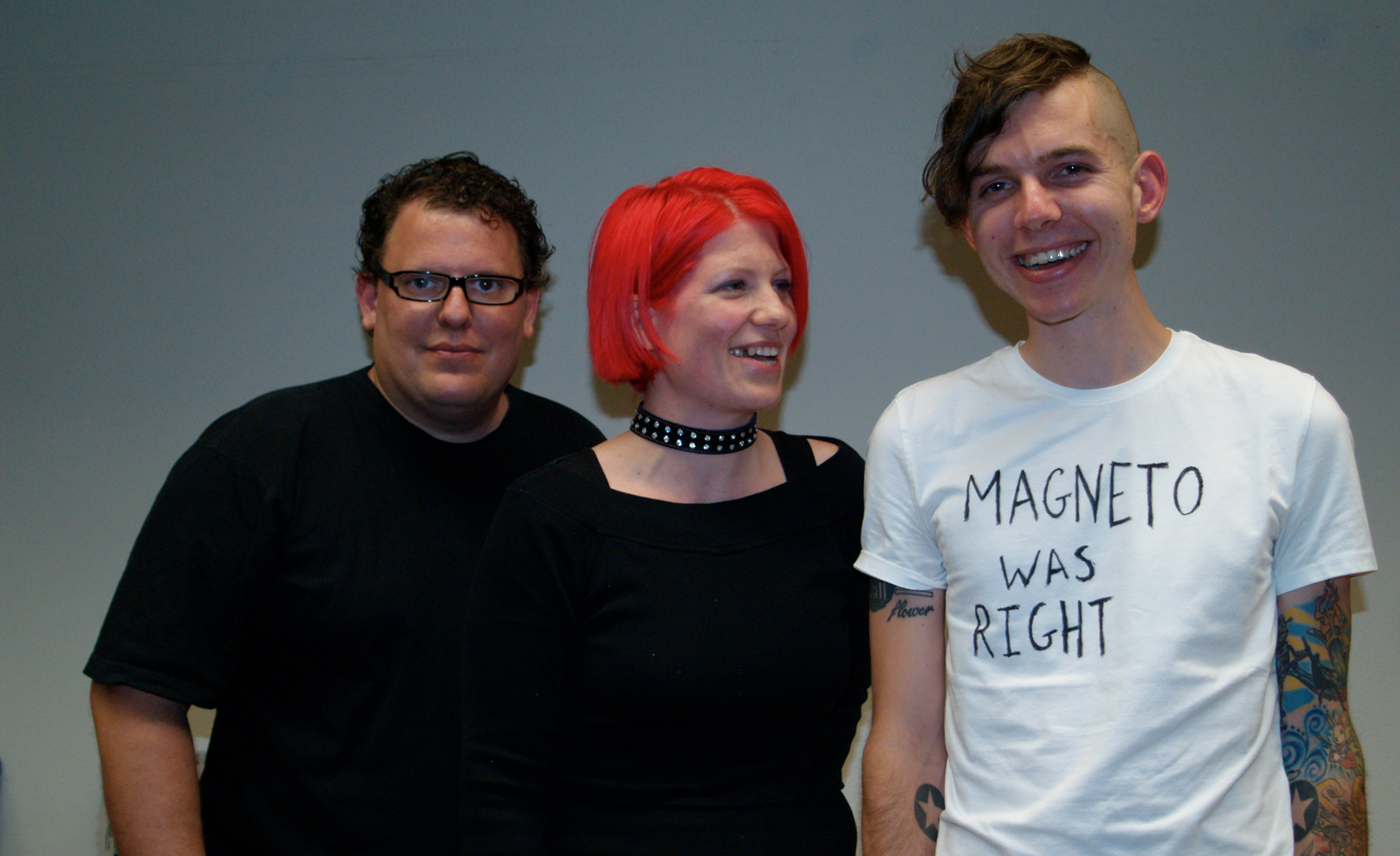
- UBERMORGEN lizvlx & Luzius Bernhard with Guantanamo Bay Prison Guard Chris Arendt
- Born: Established 1995
- Education: University of Applied Arts Vienna, Vienna University of Economics and Business
- Known for: Installation, Internet Art, Video, Photography, Performance
- Notable work: Voteauction, Nazi~Line, EKMRZ-Trilogy, Generator Tetralogy, CLICKISTAN, Asylabwehramt, Superenhanced, WOPPOW, The Next Biennial Should Be Curated by a Machine, PMC Wagner Arts, UNINVITED
- Movement: Media Hacking, Conceptual Art, net.art, Internet Art, Software Art
- Awards: ARCO Beep, Ars Electronica, IBM, Swiss Art Award

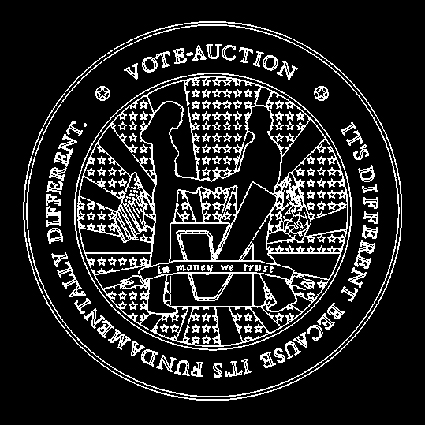
Vote-Auction Seal, 200 x 200 cm, digital print on canvas, 2000

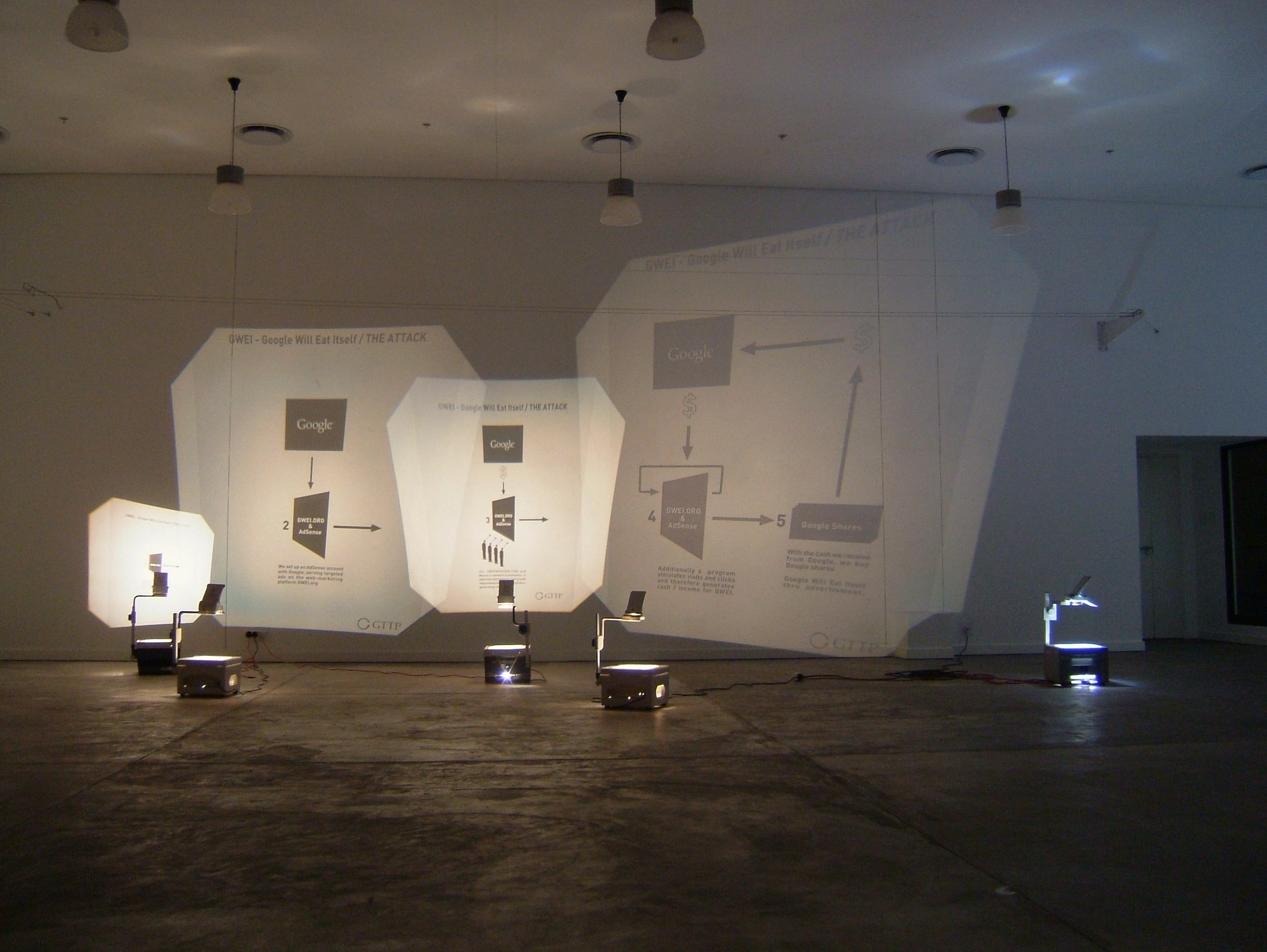
GWEI – Google Will Eat Itself – Installation, The Premises Gallery, Johannensburg, 2005

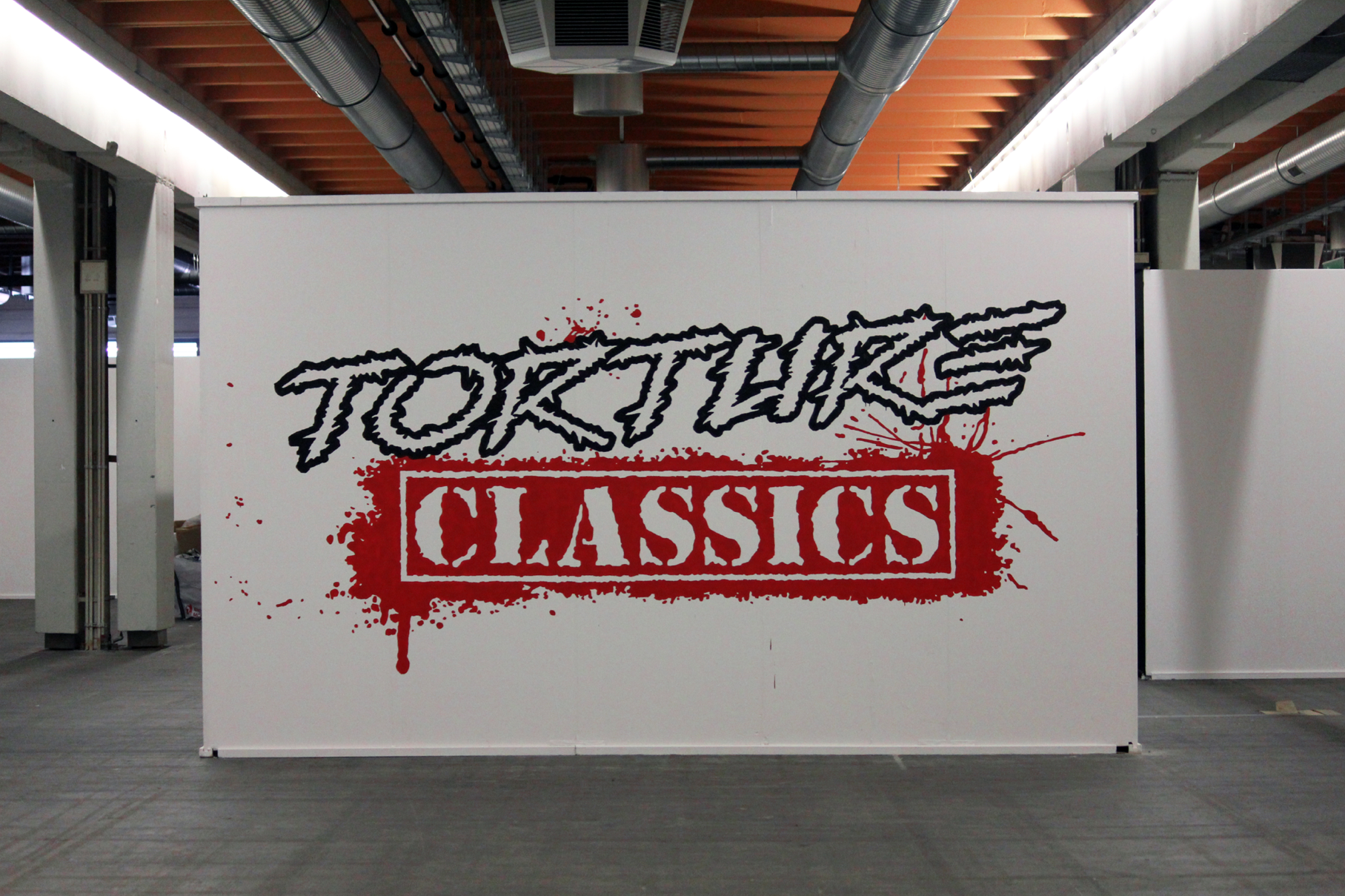
TORTURE CLASSICS Installation Basel, mixed media, 2011

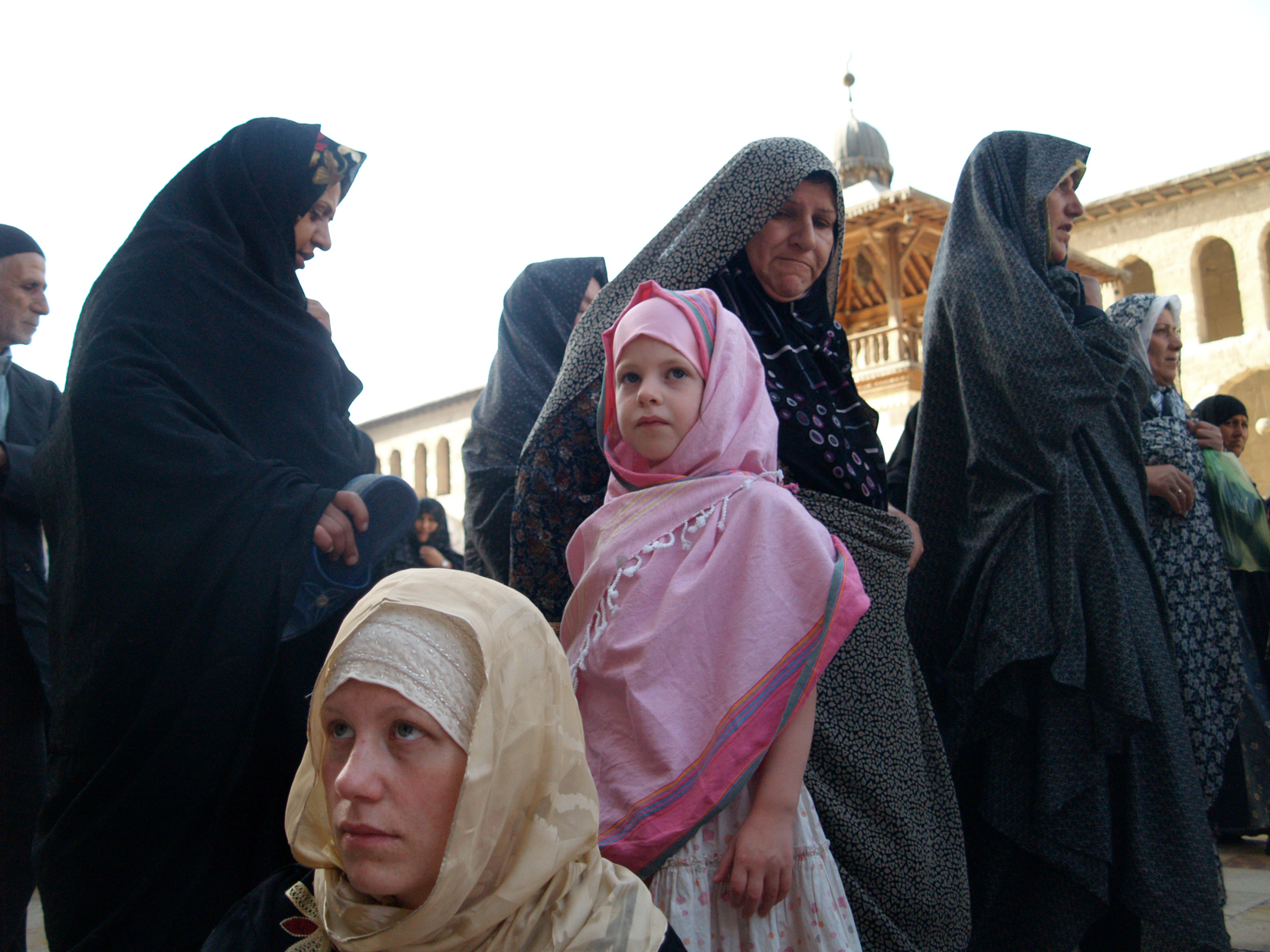
Lizvlx & Billie-Ada from UBERMORGEN during a performance in Damascus, Syria

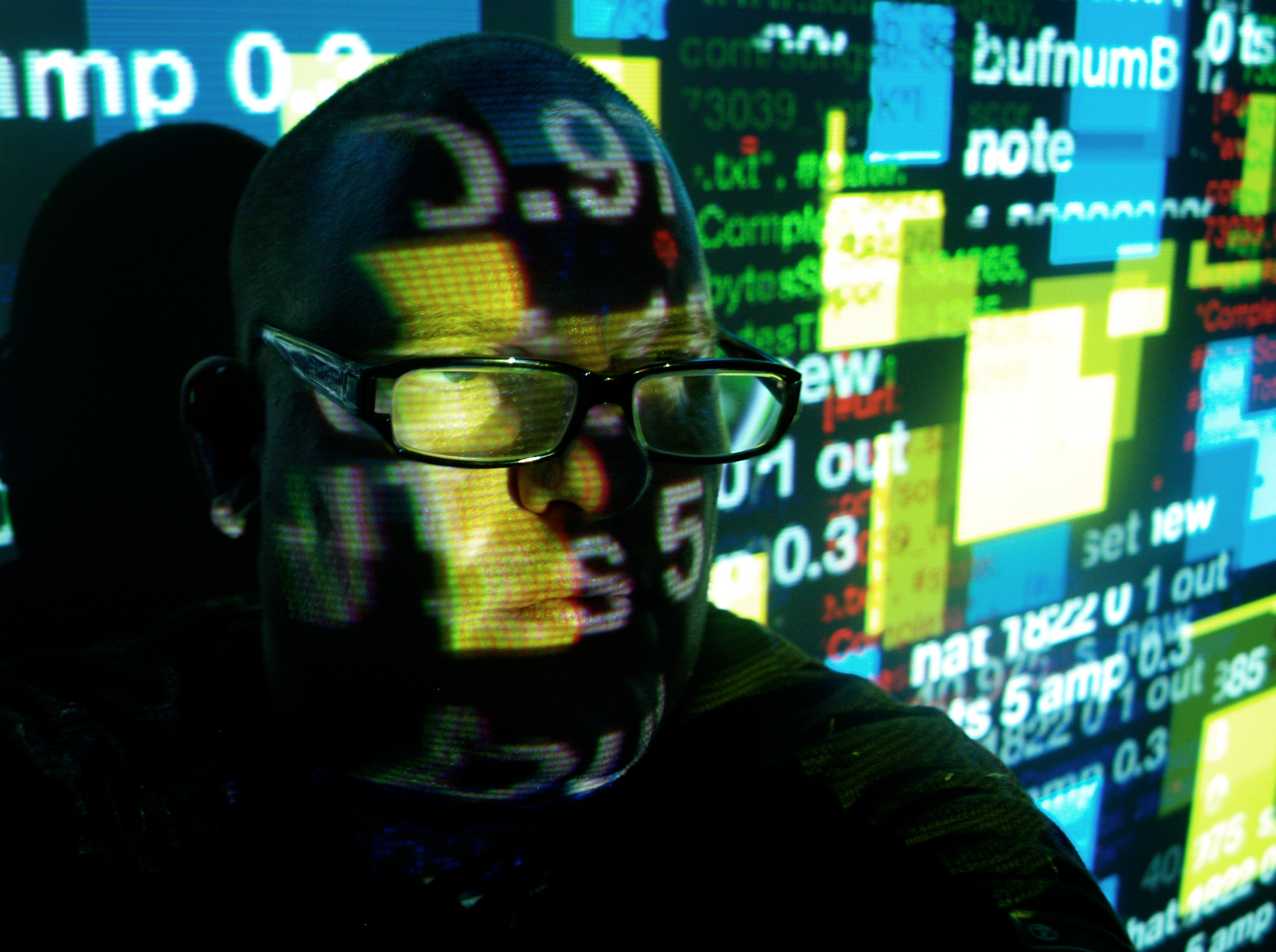
Luzius Bernhard inside Sound of eBay Installation, Madrid, 2009

UBERMORGEN is a Swiss-Austrian-American digital art group founded in 1995, composed of Liz "lizvlx" Haas, Luzius Bernhard, Billie Bernhard and Lola Bernhard. They live and work in Basel, S-chanf near St. Moritz and in Vienna, where both lizvlx and Luzius Bernhard are professors at the University of Applied Arts Vienna. Their work has been presented across a wide range of contexts including museums, biennials, galleries, universities and online platforms. They have received several awards such as the PAX Art Award 2023.

The group's practice originated in 1990s net.art and internet art avant-garde. In the 2000s they became associated with online actionism and media hacking. Since the mid-2000s their work has included installations, software art and research-oriented projects. In the 2020s they have focused on large-scale projects involving blockchain technology, machine learning and AI-generated aesthetics.

Their work frequently engages with contemporary technological systems. Critical interpretations of their practice have noted their use of affirmation, irony and ambiguity.

== Work ==
=== net.art ===
Their earliest works were part of the avantgarde Net.art movement (etoy, 1994–1998, 194.152.164.137, 1996) and were exclusively shown online (World Wide Web/WWW). This work became part of the Internet art and Digital art history and is researched at universities (dissertations, thesis) and taught in (Art history).

=== Media Hacking & Digital Actionism ===
Their early works were Media Hacking projects using low-tech tools to reach very large audiences. During the work on their best known project Voteauction (2000) CNN.com called them "Maverick Austrian Businessmen". The project resulted in an onslaught of lawsuits issued by Illinois, Texas, Arizona, California, Missouri, Massachusetts, and Wisconsin.

In 2001, they started a collaboration with Christoph Schlingensief for the development and staging of a Hamlet project in Zurich: NAZI~LINE, a bigger than life fake neo-Nazi helpline and exit strategy finding agency.

==== Injunction Generator ====
The Injunction Generator is an artistic software module by UBERMORGEN which claims to generate on request legal injunctions and personalized documentation in .rtf/.pdf format to force a website into taking its contents offline.

Carrying on with their principles of "radical corporative marketing strategy" (media hacking), the artists produced an effective and credible interface which helps creating one's own documented cease-and-desist request, which is then automatically sent to the DNS administrators, to the site's owner and to some journalists to trick them into supporting the "public trial".

The project is published at ipnic.org, an acronym which mimics the official protocols (Internet Protocol - Network Information Center), revisited as "Internet Partnership for No Internet Content".

This sarcastic provocation (a "public shutdown service") was conceived after experiencing a similar mishap during the Voteauction art project, which in 2000 invited American citizens to put up their vote for auction. At the time an email injunction by an American court was sent to the Swiss internet service provider hosting the site, who immediately took them offline even though emailed documents aren't legally considered official and even though Switzerland is outside of American jurisdiction.

=== Conceptual Actionism ===
In 2005 they started the EKMRZ Trilogy, a series of conceptual hacks (GWEI – Google Will Eat Itself, Amazon Noir and The Sound of eBay).

=== Research Performance ===
Between 2007–2011 their focus went into research-based productions (Superenhanced, WOPPOW, KRAFT Series) and Rock Art productions such as TORTURE CLASSICS and CLICKISTAN (commissioned by the Whitney Museum of American Art). They started to work extensively with video during this period.

In 2013 they released The Project Formerly Known As Kindle Forkbomb.

=== Happy Dystopia ===
In 2021 UBERMORGEN collaborated with digital humanist Leonardo Impett and curator Joasia Krysia through a series of machine learning experiments on the project The Next Biennial Should Be Curated by a Machine.

UNINVITED was a collaboration between UBERMORGEN and Nye Thompson, which is described as "a horror film for machine networks and human-machine organisms" and was presented as a film and video installation in exhibitions, and can be viewed online.

Ubermorgen was commissioned by the KW INstitute of Contemporary Art Berlin between 2023 and 2024. They showed the work PMC Wagner Arts at the "Poetics of Encryption" exhibition.

At the Busan Biennale 2024 they exhibited their work The Silver Singularity. The work was the last in their Happy Dystopia series. They released a Manifesto on Happy Dystopia on the KUNSTFORUM International website.

== Exhibitions ==
Since 1999 their work has been shown in museums and galleries in Europe, America, Africa, Australia and Asia. That includes venues such as SFMOMA, Centre Pompidou, Konsthall Malmoe, NTT ICC Museum Tokyo, Gwangju Design Biennale, ZKM Karlsruhe, MUMOK Vienna, Ars Electronica Linz, WRO Media Art Biennale Wrocław, MoCA Taipei, Witte de With Rotterdam, Lentos Art Museum Linz, Biennale of Sydney, ARCO Madrid and the New Museum New York.

They have been represented by Fabio Paris Brescia, [DAM] Berlin and Carroll / Fletcher London. Their primary NFT platform is Objkt.

== Life and career ==
Lizvlx and Luzius Bernhard are an artist duo but also a couple in private life. They are engaged and have two children, Billie-Ada (2003) and Lola Mae (2007).

Lizvlx was born in Linz (AT) and grew up in Wels, Salzburg and Elmira (Upstate New York). Luzius Bernhard was born at the Yale University Hospital in New Haven (USA), grew up in New Haven and Basel (CH) and moved to Vienna (AT) to study with Prof. Peter Weibel, and later on with Prof. Lev Manovich (UCSD), Prof. Peter Lunenfeld (Art Center College of Design) Pasadena and Prof. Bazon Brock (emeritus) de:Bazon Brock (Wuppertal) and completed his studies in 1999.

Both Lizvlx and Luzius Bernhard have assumed different alias. Known alias of Luzius are: hans_extrem, etoy.HANS, etoy.BRAINHARD, David Arson, Dr.Andreas Bichlbauer, net_CALLBOY, Andy Bichlbaum.

Lizvlx and Luzius Bernhard were professors at Academy of Media Arts Cologne (KHM). They are currently professors at the University of Applied Arts Vienna in the Digital Arts department. In 2015 Luzius was a guest professor and Jury member at the Kunsthochschule Kassel.

Due to his drug abuse and a manic episode in Cape Town 2002, Luzius Bernhard was diagnosed bipolar.

The collaboration with both their children (Superenhanced & Spielendes Baby – Schlafendes Baby (original title)), the inclusion of Luzius's mental illness and the merger of private and public life led some critics and academics to consider UBERMORGEN as a Gesamtkunstwerk.

Important personal and artistic influences were early meetings with Jean Tinguely, Joseph Beuys, Daniel Spoerri and Eberhard W. Kornfeld in the Basel art scene of the 1980s and with Niki de Saint Phalle in St. Moritz, and the long-time relationship (going back to 1916 during the first world war and the purchase of a Giovanni Giacometti painting by the grand-grandfather of Luzius Bernhard) with the Giacometti family (Giovanni Giacometti, Alberto Giacometti) in the nearby mountain valleys Val Bregaglia and Engadin in the canton Grisons in Switzerland.

== Network ==
Over the last 15 years UBERMORGEN has been part of the global contemporary technology art scene. Some mentionable connections and collaborations from this period: Net.Artists Alexei Shulgin, Heath Bunting, Olia Lialina, Vuk Ćosić and with contemporary artists Aram Bartholl, Paolo Cirio, James Powderly and Evan Roth from Free Art and Technology Lab and Graffiti Research Lab, Franco and Eva Mattes (0100101110101101.org), IRWIN, Franz West, Janez Janša, Johannes Grenzfurthner (monochrom), Carsten Nicolai, Minerva Cuevas, The Yes Men, Zhang Peili, Jodi, Miltos Manetas, Rafael Lozano-Hemmer, Trevor Paglen, Douglas Rushkoff, Lev Manovich, Olga Goriunova, Nicolas Bourriaud, Addie Wagenknecht, Aldo Chaparro, Melissa Logan (Chicks on Speed), Kevin Abosch, Auriea Harvey, Casey Reas, Knowbotic Research, Constant Dullaart, Damjanski, Donna Kukama, Echo Can Luo, Dragan Espenschied, Eric Paulos, Exonemom, Jan Robert Leegte, Jean Peters, Julia Scher, PSJM, Shimurabros, Shu Lea Cheang and Tamiko Thiel.

== Publications ==
- Domenico Quaranta (ed), UBERMORGEN.COM, FPEditions, Brescia 2009 (ISBN 978-8890330858)
- Alessandro Ludovico (ed), UBERMORGEN.COM – MEDIA HACKING VS. CONCEPTUAL ART, Christoph Merian Verlag, Basel 2009 (ISBN 978-3856164607)
- Coded Cultures – New Creative Practices out of Diversity", Series: Edition Angewandte, Russegger, Georg; Tarasiewicz, Matthias; Wlodkowski, Michal (Eds.), SpringerWienNewYork Publisher, 1st Edition., 2011, 384 p. 50 illus, Softcover, ISBN 978-3-7091-0457-6, p. 334–355, "From Somebody's Desire to Everyone's Responsibility", Yukiko Shikata/UBERMORGEN.COM,
- This is a magazine, Pink Laser Beam, Compendium #6, , "Pink Laser Beam" Paper, Plastic, Glue, Thread, Metal-foil, Edition of 666, 2009, "Amazon Noir project" (with Alessandro Ludovico and Paolo Cirio).

== Awards ==
- Pax Art Award 2023
- Swiss Art Award 2011, TORTURE CLASSICS
- ARCO Beep Award 2009, EKMRZ-Trilogy
- IBM AWARD FOR NEW MEDIA/Stuttgarter Filmwinter, 2007, Amazon Noir
- Ars Electronica 2005, Award of Distinction for Vote-Auction
- Ars Electronica, Honorary Mentions for Injunction Generator (2003) and GWEI – Google Will Eat Itself (2005)
- Ars Electronica 1996, Golden Nica for etoy/digital hijack (Luzius Bernhard)
