= The Project Formerly Known As Kindle Forkbomb =

The Project Formerly Known as Kindle Forkbomb is a work done by the Swiss-Austrian-American duo known as Ubermorgen. The artists are known for their creative use of digital media, combined with other means such as performance and various offline medium to convey their ideas. The project is showcased on Ubermorgen's website and was initially shown at Kunsthal Aarhus in the Show "Systemics #2: As we may think (or, the next world library)" and at DAM Gallery Berlin, both in 2013.

== Project Overview ==
The project's name: "The Project Formerly Known as Kindle Forkbomb" can be broken down to better understand the meaning behind the work. Forkbomb is a term used in computing, describing an attack in which a computer process continuously self-replicates until the machine's resources are depleted or the system crashes.

== Process Outline ==
The art project depicts a machine process that strips comments from YouTube, then uses an algorithm to compile the comments and finally titling the work under video title and respective uploader to make a book. This book is then uploaded to the Kindle Publishing service and placed on the Kindle Store. After, the machine monitors the books making sure that enough sales are made to keep them alive on the store. If they aren't thriving on the store the machine is directed to purchase copies, thus prolonging their shelf-life.

== Purpose ==
Using this process the artists' message and intent was to show how easily they could clog the store with their rapidly multiplying number of books (hence Kindle Forkbomb). This is an example of critique on the digital world and the problems it poses. While it was merely a demonstration, it makes it easier to visualize the world we live in.

Kindle Forkbomb set up as a sculpture.

== Artists' Remarks ==
Ubermorgen describes the media created by this human-machine combination as the creation of a new genre of decentralized fiction writing. The artist group says that these books are a compressed form of our contemporary world, but they describe just a snapshot of it, frozen in time. This type of work is a form of art sometimes referred to as "uncreative" spurred by the famous writer Kenneth Goldsmith's efforts in uncreative writing.

== Published books ==
Some examples of the works produced through this project:

- Show country begins They - Sosodni Riottto
- It.. cut "sang" missed grabbed can't - Jasmmmm Evieraa
- Marge think caresit not is page - Cptmole Kenslov
- You funny get car - Nrlnick Kencals

One thing to note is that the cover of all the books feature the uploader, then the video title and underneath everything is the text string ":(){ :|:& };:" which is the Bash Shell version of a computer forkbomb. Following the reference link takes you to the website where you are allowed to read the full pdf version of the books.
