= The Yes Men Fix the World =

- Promotional film poster
- Directed by: Andy Bichlbaum; Mike Bonanno; Kurt Engfehr
- Produced by: Doro Bachrach; Patrice Barrat; Ruth Charny; Alan Hayling; Laura Nix; Jess Search; Amy Sommer; Juliette Timsit
- Starring: Andy Bichlbaum; Mike Bonanno; Reggie Watts
- Edited by: April Merl
- Music by: Neel Murgai; Noisola
- Distributed by: HBO
- Release date: October 23, 2009
- Running time: 87 minutes P2P Edition: 96 minutes
- Countries: United States; United Kingdom; France
- Language: English

The Yes Men Fix the World is a 2009 documentary film about the culture jamming exploits of The Yes Men. The film premiered in New York City and Los Angeles on October 23, 2009, and in other U.S. cities beginning on October 30. Due to the movie being sued by United States Chamber of Commerce, a special edition of the movie is distributed through bittorrent through VODO and other prominent torrent sites like The Pirate Bay and EZTV.

The film documents the following projects:

- Dow Chemical and Bhopal
- ExxonMobil Vivoleum
- Halliburton Survivaball
- HUD and post-Katrina public housing
- The New York Times hopeful future edition

== Reception ==
On the review aggregator website Rotten Tomatoes, 75% of 57 critics' reviews are positive, with an average rating of 6.7/10. The website's consensus reads: "The Yes Men aim their barbs at the capitalist fat-cats with gutsy and hilarious performance pranks." Metacritic, which uses a weighted average, assigned the film a score of 71 out of 100, based on 19 critics, indicating "generally favorable" reviews.
