= Teen Talk Barbie =

1992 Barbie toy

Teen Talk Barbie is an edition of Mattel's Barbie doll, introduced in 1992, that incorporates a voice box programmed to speak one of four randomly selected phrases when a button is pushed. It became controversial because one of the spoken phrases was "Math class is tough", and was also later used for a protest wherein some dolls had the voice boxes exchanged with those for Talking Duke G.I. Joe action figures produced by Hasbro.

== Doll ==
Teen Talk Barbie was introduced at the 1992 American International Toy Fair and became available for sale July that year. Approximately 350,000 models were produced. The dolls contained voice boxes pre-programmed with a random selection of four phrases from a pool of 270 possibilities, including "Will we ever have enough clothes?", "Let's plan our dream wedding!", "I'm studying to be a doctor", "Wanna have a pizza party?", "Want to go shopping?", "Okay, meet me at the mall", "Wouldn't you love to be a lifeguard?", "Let's have a campfire", and "Math class is tough".

== Controversy ==
The phrase "Math class is tough" sparked criticism from educators and advocacy groups, including the National Council of Teachers of Mathematics, who argued that it discouraged girls from pursuing math and science. The American Association of University Women also condemned the phrase, citing a report on girls' poor education in these subjects. Mattel initially offered to exchange dolls for nonspeaking ones on request, and later apologized to the American Association of University Women, withdrew the math class phrase from those to be used in future dolls, and offered an exchange to purchasers who had a doll with that phrase.

The criticism gave rise to the 1994 "Lisa vs. Malibu Stacy" episode of The Simpsons, in which Lisa Simpson objects to sexist utterances by a "Malibu Stacy" doll such as "Thinking too much gives you wrinkles." As of 2005, the collector's price for one of the estimated 3,500 Teen Talk Barbies including the phrase "Math class is tough" was around $500.

== Voice box exchange with G.I. Joe ==
In 1993, to draw attention to what they regarded as outdated gender stereotypes exemplified by the dolls, a group of East Village performance artists calling themselves the Barbie Liberation Organization orchestrated an exchange of voice boxes between 300 Teen Talk Barbies and Hasbro Talking Duke G.I. Joe action figures, which were replaced on store shelves. Affected Teen Talk Barbies spoke phrases such as "Eat lead, Cobra!", "Attack!", and "Vengeance is mine!" They were found in stores in New York and California.
