= Jank =

Jank may refer to:

- Jank (band), American rock band
- Jank (surname), a German surname
- Jank Zajfman, or Yank Azman (born 1947), Canadian actor
- Jank, a slang term for game mechanics of unconventional, flawed design, or implementation, including the experience of such mechanics
