= Jacques Servin =

American artist and activist

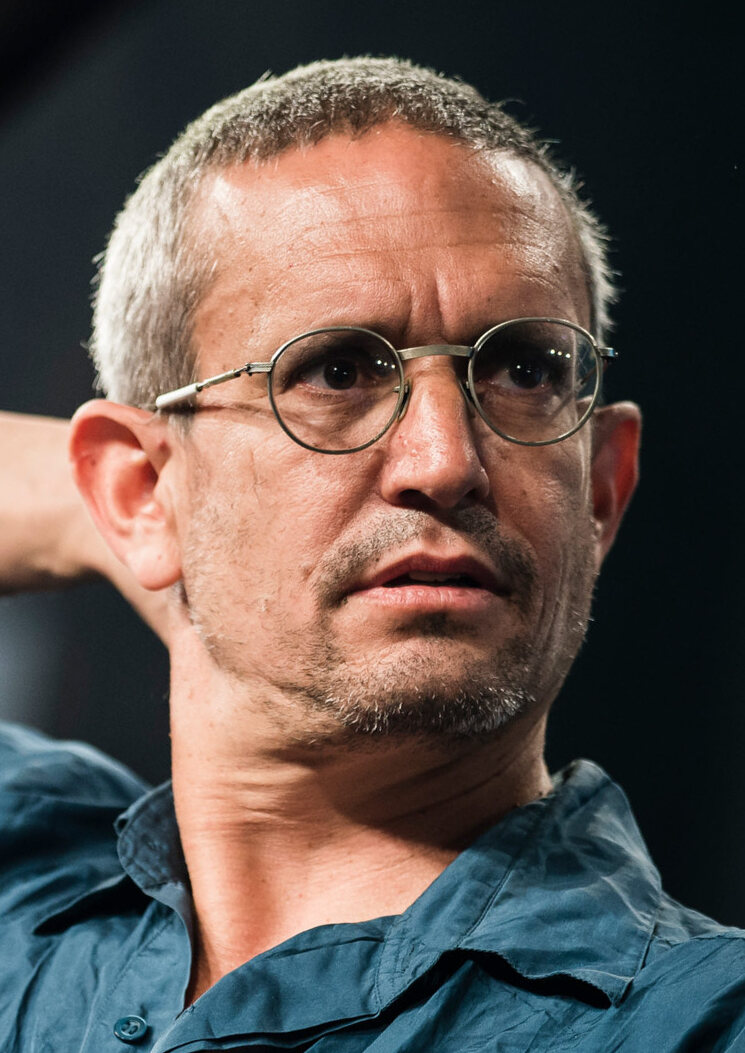
- Jacques Servin, in 2014
- Born: 1963 (age 62–63)
- Other names: Andy Bichlbaum, Ray Thomas

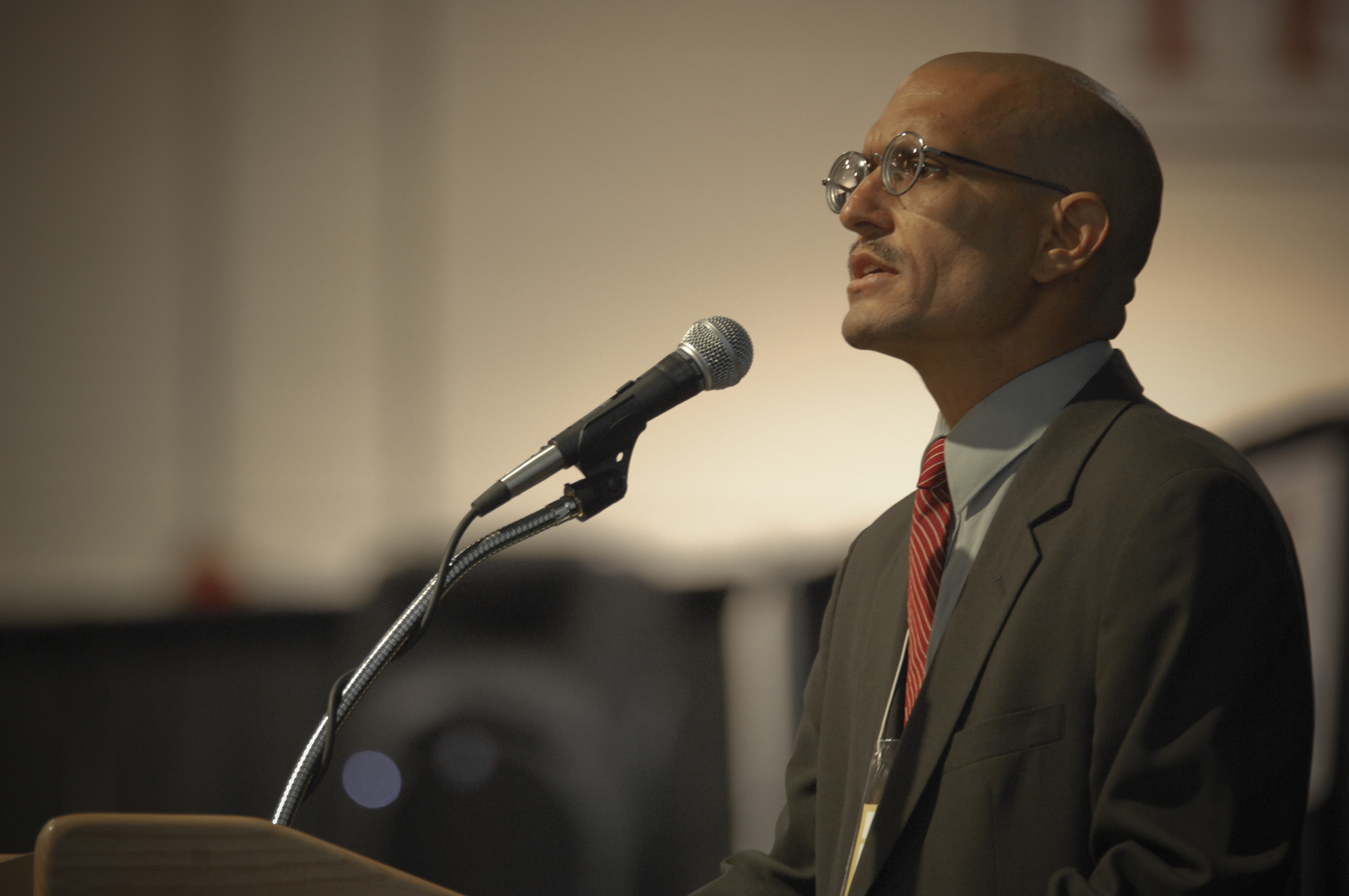
Servin presents Exxon's new human flesh-derived "Vivoleum" future fuel at a Keynote Luncheon at the GO-Expo 2007 (Oil and Gas Exposition) in Canada.

Jacques Servin (also known by the pseudonym Andy Bichlbaum; born 1963) is an American media artist, activist, and writer. He is one of the leading members of The Yes Men, a culture jamming activist group. Their exploits in "identity correction" are documented in the films The Yes Men (2003), The Yes Men Fix the World (2009), and The Yes Men Are Revolting (2014). As "Ray Thomas", he is a co-founder of RTMark (stylized as ®™ark and pronounced as "Art Mark").

A former Maxis employee, he was fired in 1996 after secretly adding code into the game SimCopter that would cause sprites of men in swimming trunks kissing each other to appear on certain dates. He said he did this due to the intolerable working conditions suffered at Maxis. This was not discovered until after the game had been published. Servin said the activist group RTMark had given him $5,000 to do it. Later it came out that Servin was a co-founder of RTMark under the pseudonym "Ray Thomas", though he initially claimed to have very little knowledge of the then-anonymous organization.

Servin is also the author of two books of short stories, published with FC2. Originally from Tucson, Arizona, Servin is currently finishing a memoir of caring for a mother with Alzheimer's. He is also helping to develop a program to alleviate homelessness in Tucson. He is gay.

Prior to forming The Yes Men, Servin was a leading member of the Barbie Liberation Organization.
