= Barbie Liberation Organization =

Group of artists and activists protesting gender stereotypes

- Formation: 1993
- Type: Coalition
- Purpose: Activism
- Methods: Culture jamming
- Fields: Gender stereotypes Criticism of capitalism Plastic pollution
- Website: barbieliberation.org (archived)

The Barbie Liberation Organization, or BLO, are a group of artists and activists involved in culture jamming. Self described as "an underground network of creative activists," the group gained notoriety in 1993 after switching voice boxes in talking G.I. Joes and Barbie dolls. They resurfaced in August 2023, claiming to be the toy giant Mattel in order to announce a new collection of MyCeliaBarbie EcoWarrior Edition compostable dolls, and a corporate wide move to plastic free toy production.

In their first campaign, the BLO performed "surgery" on a reported 300–500 dolls from retail and returned them to shelves, an action they refer to as shopgiving. Thus, Teen Talk Barbie dolls would say phrases such as "Vengeance is mine", while G.I. Joe dolls would say phrases such as "The beach is the place for summer!" Two leading members of the BLO, Jacques Servin and Igor Vamos, would go on to found the culture jamming and political action group The Yes Men.

In 2023, actress Daryl Hannah, posing as a spokesperson for Mattel, introduced a purported collection of biodegradable dolls and announced in a short video that the company would stop using plastic by 2030. This was one of several videos produced by Yellow Dot Studios as part of the BLO's campaign to leverage the publicity surrounding the launch of the Barbie film to raise concerns about the pervasive use of plastics. Tying in with the satirical campaign is a hoax website bearing heavy resemblance to the real Mattel corporate site, where they issued a fake press release for the fictitious biodegradable Barbie line.

== Motivation and context ==
The BLO was originally conceived in an effort to question and ultimately change the gender stereotypes American culture is known for after Mattel released a speaking Teen Talk Barbie that said "Math class is tough." It took place in the middle of the culture wars of the 1990s when creative dissent was once again gaining popularity and artists and activists were often trying to conceive of new ways to rebel against cultural stereotypes and powerful forms like network TV. By 1993, criticism of Barbie as a negative gender stereotype for women was commonplace both in academia and popular culture. This may have been partially responsible for the generally positive response of the public to the project—the criticism they were making was familiar and not a controversial point to make during the 1990s. Although their criticism was not new, the creative form of hacking used by the BLO was noteworthy.

== Methods ==
There is a detailed description of the complex "surgery" they performed available on their website, encouraging others to take part in the surgeries themselves. The surgery required some technical skills, tools and precision, but the voice boxes in the dolls were similar enough that the surgery could be reproduced fairly easily in other parts of the country. They outlined the surgery in easy to understand images. After the surgery they would secretly return the toys to shelves, what they call reverse shoplifting.

They also produced a video to explain their point. They used the familiar form of the nightly news message, collaged with cutting edge video art techniques to get their point across. Viewers would be unable to tell exactly what was news and what was made up, they made some points through exaggerations and some through the use of actual news footage. They recruited two children, one from San Diego, California, and one from Albany, New York, to showcase the modified toys to the news. Additionally, the BLO used their extra stock of modified dolls to go to stores that were near news stations that were covering the story, planted a modified doll on the shelf, and waited for the journalists to purchase the BLO's toy; this would show the reach and a seemingly large scale operation. Having children already prepped to be interviewed and planning ahead to gain media coverage helped the BLO's image and reach.

The media responded with coverage, but no legal issues were ever seriously raised. Hasbro and Mattel, the makers of the dolls brushed off the action with little fuss, although one person was outraged with the "terrorist attacks" directed at children.

== Debate ==
Because of the nature of culture jamming, it is hard to tell how many Barbies and G.I. Joes were actually switched, and how much of the media attention was orchestrated by the group. The artist Igor Vamos, known for acts of media intervention, intentionally fed information to the media to report more cases of the switched identity surgeries. Although most sources suggest between 300 and 500 toys were hacked, other reports up to 3,000 toys across the country and in other countries like Canada, France and England. Others assert that only 12 toys were actually switched and the rest was cleverly arranged media hype by Vamos and his associates. This perspective indicates that the project was also a critique of the nature of the television and media culture of the 1990s, which led to other media interventions by Vamos, collaborators, and other groups in the coming years.
