= Jank (surname) =

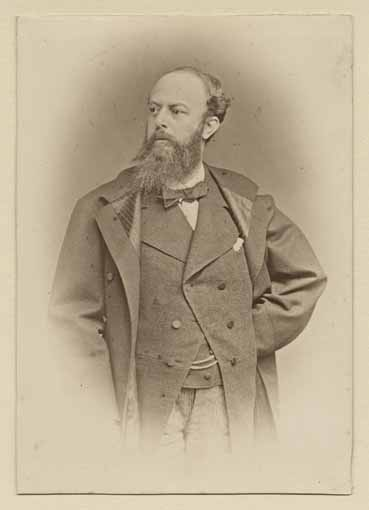
Christian Jank, about 1880

Jank is a German language family name. The family tree traces back to Hinrich Jank (1576–1673) of Oberlausitz.

== People with the surname ==
- Christian Jank (1833–1888), German scenic painter and stage designer
- Angelo Jank (1868–1940), German animal painter, illustrator and member of the Munich Secession.
- Klaus-Dieter Jank (born 1952), German footballer
- Isa Jank (born 1952), birth name of Isa Andersen, German actress
- Christoph Jank (born 1973), Austrian football player
- Bohumil Jank (born 1992), Czech ice hockey player
- Fabian Jank (born 1996), German politician (AfD)
