= Decadent Action =

Anarchist organisation in the United Kingdom

Decadent Action was an Anarchist organisation in the United Kingdom during the 1990s who acted as a mock "consumer terrorist group" and "High Street anarchist-guerrilla organisation" (or culture jammers). The group argued that only a credit collapse through excessive consumer spending could bring about the end of capitalism and that bringing about excessive inflation through unrestrained consumer spending was the sole lever which could precipitate the economic collapse upon which any revolutionary action is predicated. Therefore, its accelerationist approach promoted the idea of irresponsible credit and excessive spending on hedonistic pursuits to achieve its goals.

Its manifesto was first published in The Idler magazine and then Stewart Home's anthology Mind Invaders: A Reader in Psychic Warfare, Cultural Sabotage And Semiotic Terrorism (Serpent's Tail, 1997).

An article in New Statesman noted Decadent Action's opposition to Buy Nothing Day. In contrast, the group was notable for organising the first Phone-in Sick Day, which saw thousands of British Airways employees call in sick to work in 1997, with the same happening amongst Irish Garda in 1998. The purpose of the stunt was in protest against "the erosion of the eight-hour work day" and for a "declining quality of life in Europe and the United States".

On 20th October 1997, Channel 4 broadcast a 30 minute programme about Decadent Action and its ideas as the "Gluttony" episode in its Deadly Sins series.

== See also ==
- Alternative culture
- Anti-consumerism
- Culture jamming
