= Voteauction =

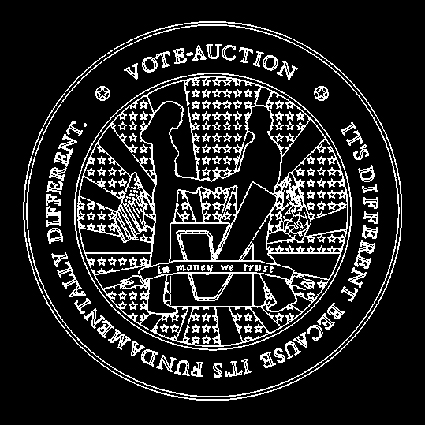
The Vote-Auction Seal

Voteauction.com was a satirical website that during the 2000 U.S. presidential election offered U.S. citizens an anonymous and quick way to sell their vote to the highest bidder. 13 U.S. states issued temporary restraining orders and injunctions, for alleged illegal vote trading and consumer fraud. Over 2,500 news media outlets reported on the project including a 27-minute CNN "Burden of Proof" special.

== Background ==
Voteauction was the brainchild of James Baumgartner, at the time a student at Rensselaer Polytechnic Institute, the website was later sold for an undisclosed sum to Ubermorgen.com in Austria. The artist duo consisting of lizvlx (AT) and Hans Bernhard (CH/USA) ran it from August 1 – November 7, 2000, posing as "Eastern European business people". CNN.com called them "Maverick Austrian Businessmen". Legal precautions against extradition and rendition were taken by consulting specialists in different countries and by physically moving on a daily basis. The auctioning web-site was re-designed in September and underwent minor changes over the course of the project. The web-site initial domain voteauction.com (hosted by Domainbank) and the second domain vote-auction.com were disabled by American court orders and without legally served court order by CORENIC in Geneva, leading to a series of press-releases to communicate the new location, hence generating more publicity for the web-site. The server-infrastructure was attacked several times and the site had to move to a more secure location.

== Exhibitions ==
UBERMORGEN.COM shows all the original documents (approximately 700 kg of complaints, court decisions, injunctions) generated by the proceedings in exhibitions worldwide, and refers to them as ‹foriginals› (a combination of ‹forged› and ‹original›). The permanent amalgamation of fact and fiction realized in this way points toward an extremely expanded concept of one’s working materials, which for Ubermorgen.com also include (international) rights, democracy and global communication (input-feedback-loops). Vote-Auction was exhibited at the Lentos Kunstmuseum Linz (Austria) 2005, Eyebeam New York, 2010, expo.02 Switzerland, 2002.

== Related projects and Election Trilogy ==
As an affirmative approach towards the illegal delivery of court orders from U.S. courts to Europe, UBERMORGEN.COM released the "Injunction generator", an engine which renders customized court orders on demand.

In 2004 UBERMORGEN.COM released the 2nd part of the "Election Trilogy" named *THE*AGENCY for manual election recount. In 2007 WAHLGELD.COM, a vote-buying and selling platform for the Swiss parliamentary elections was launched. The actual selling and buying of votes was covered by leaking information about the authors (as artists), therefore the election commission, the media and the voters were certain about the non-commercial motivation. Approximately 700 electoral votes were bought for an average of CHF 75.-.

== Team, collaborators, supporters, defendants, plaintiffs ==
- Ubermorgen.com
- Hans Bernhard a.k.a. Dr. Andreas Bichlbauer
- lizvlx a.k.a. Sandra Baierl a.k.a. Elisabeth Haas
- James Baumgartner
- Tilmann Singer
- Silver Server
- lo-res.org
- Oskar Obereder
- Christoph Johannes Mutter
- hell.com
- Bootlab Berlin
- Domenico Quaranta
- Domain Bank Inc.
- Luzius Bernhard
- Stephanie Schliepack
- State of Missouri
