= SimCopter =

1996 video game

- Developer: Maxis
- Publisher: Maxis
- Producer: Jim Siefert
- Designer: Will Wright
- Programmer: Ed Goldman
- Artists: Ocean Quigley; Sharon Barr
- Composer: Jerry Martin
- Series: SimCity
- Platform: Microsoft Windows
- Release: NA: November 20, 1996; EU: 1996
- Genre: Amateur flight simulation
- Mode: Single-player

SimCopter is a 1996 flight simulator video game developed by Maxis. It puts the player into a 3D city. Like Streets of SimCity, SimCopter lets the player import SimCity 2000 maps into the game. It is also the first game to use the Sim language Simlish.

== Gameplay ==
SimCopter puts the player in the role of a helicopter pilot. There are two modes of play: user mode and career mode. The user mode (free mode) lets the player fly around cities that they have created (which can be imported from SimCity 2000) or any of the 30 cities supplied with the game. However, user cities sometimes need to be designed with SimCopter in mind; most of the time, the player must increase the number of police stations, fire stations, and hospitals to allow for speedier dispatches. The career mode puts the player in the shoes of a pilot doing various jobs around a city.

While all other criminals roam the streets by foot, burglars drive through the city at high speed and are difficult to catch. All types of criminals can be arrested by picking up a police officer from the roof of a police station, and then dropping them near the criminal. Police cars can also be dispatched to aid in the arrest of a criminal. Criminals on foot can also be stopped by landing on top of them with the helicopter, which kills them, but also risks damage to the helicopter. Dropped police officers will call out whether or not they see the suspect; the officers need to be guided by the helicopter's spotlight. If a police officer does not find a suspect, it will return to the helicopter. As soon as a police officer sees a suspect, they will remain in pursuit until the suspect is arrested. Criminals can be slowed down by either using the spotlight or calling out the "Stop Criminal" message through the megaphone. Eight jobs are available, namely traffic jams, fires, rescues (which may occur during fire missions), catching criminals, riot control, MEDEVAC, transporting Sims, and speeding cars. Speeders can only be found by looking for a car that is belching exhaust behind it and squeals its tires when making turns. Once a speeder is pulled over, the helicopter must stay with it until a police car arrives to cite them for their reckless driving, or the speeder will take off again. Once the speeder is cited, another car will be selected to become the next speeder.

=== Money and points ===
Money and points can be earned by completing missions. Money and points can also be lost if the player runs out of time or does not complete a mission. Missions will take points from the player after a set amount of time from the start of the mission while it remains uncompleted. Some missions will eventually be canceled, resulting in a point loss or a forfeited reward after completion. MEDEVAC or firefighting missions will result in large penalties if the victim dies or if the area gets destroyed by the fire. When the player has accumulated enough points, the game lets them move on to the next city. The player then has a choice of going into a new city of the same difficulty or advancing to the next level. There are twelve levels of difficulty, with new types of jobs being introduced and previous types of jobs increasing in difficulty. Jobs will be randomly spawned around the city, but the player's actions can also create jobs.

=== Helicopters and upgrades ===
The player starts with a small, weak helicopter that comes with just a megaphone and a bambi bucket; it can only hold two passengers. As the player accumulates money in the game, they can purchase better helicopters and newer equipment. Some jobs require certain equipment in order to complete them, and better helicopters offer greater speed, smoother handling, and greater passenger capacity. Helicopters have a limited fuel capacity and must return to the hangar about once every half hour to refuel, which costs money. If the helicopter runs out of fuel in mid-air, the player can either attempt to keep the rotors spinning and land it, or just let it fall to the ground and suffer heavy damage. If the helicopter remains intact after falling to the ground, it can be refueled at a highly inflated price.

Crashing the helicopter into a building or slamming it into the ground will not destroy it instantly, but will damage it. The more damage there is to the helicopter, the harder it is to control. Money can be spent to repair a helicopter. If the helicopter is destroyed, it is lost forever along with all of the equipment on board. When a helicopter is destroyed, it may set fire to a nearby building or terrain. If the player does not have enough money to buy a new helicopter, the player is grounded, making it impossible to continue on.

The helicopters in SimCopter are:

- Schweizer 300
- Bell 206 JetRanger
- McDonnell Douglas MD 500
- McDonnell Douglas MD 520 NOTAR
- Bell 212
- Augusta A109
- Dauphin 2
- McDonnell Douglas Explorer
- Boeing AH-64 Apache

=== UFOs ===
Maps that have an Apache in them will also occasionally have a UFO that flies around. They abduct Sims with a mysterious force (Sims will "dance" while they ascend), and also randomly shoot vertical beams that start fires if they hit trees or buildings. If the beam hits the player, the screen fades to white and the copter is instantly destroyed. If the UFO falls into the water, the player can rescue a surviving abductee for more points. If the UFO is shot down, the player receives 1,000 points.

== Easter egg ==
The game gained controversy when it was discovered that the designer Jacques Servin inserted an Easter egg that generated shirtless men in Speedo trunks who hugged and kissed each other and appear in great numbers on certain dates, such as Friday the 13th. The egg was caught shortly after release and removed from future copies of the game. He cited his actions as a response to the intolerable working conditions he allegedly suffered at Maxis, particularly working 60-hour weeks and being denied time off. He also reported that he added the "studs", as he called them, after a heterosexual programmer programmed "bimbo" female characters into the game, and that he wanted to highlight the "implicit heterosexuality" of many games. Although he had initially planned for the characters to appear only occasionally, the random number generator he had created malfunctioned, leading them to appear frequently. Servin was fired as a result, with Maxis reporting that his dismissal was due only to his addition of unauthorized content. This caused a member of AIDS Coalition to Unleash Power (ACT UP), a gay AIDS organization, to call for a boycott of all of Maxis' products, a measure which Servin rejected. Some months later, a group named RTMark announced its existence and claimed responsibility for the Easter egg being inserted into the game, along with 16 other acts of "creative subversion." Servin stated that he had received a money order of $5,000 from RTMark for the prank. It was revealed later on that Servin was a cofounder of RTMark.

== Nintendo 64 version ==
A gameplay screenshot of the E3 1997 build. The poor draw distance of the title was criticized by the press at the time, and would be a key factor in the cancellation of its North American release.

A Nintendo 64 version was announced by Maxis on May 22, 1997, a few weeks before E3 1997, where a playable prototype was presented. On October 9, 1997, Maxis announced that the game would instead be ported to 64DD peripheral, with an explicit intention of being a North American launch game for the platform, and with Electronic Arts being announced as its publisher; however, years later in an interview for the Video Game History Foundation, Akifumi “Aki” Kodama (president of Maxis K.K., developer of the conversion) and Jeffrey J. Feil (associated producer in SimCopter 64 for Electronic Arts, owners of Maxis) said they never saw a 64DD build, with the former also saying that interaction with other games was never implemented at any point. When asked about the 64DD in an issue of Nintendo Power from January 1998, Shigeru Miyamoto mentioned that the game would have an integration with Mario Artist and SimCity 64, in earlier interviews he also mentioned integration with SimCity 2000. The game was unofficially canceled on March 9, 1999, following the repeated delays of the peripheral.

There are at least two surviving prototypes of the port, one being the E3 1997 build, dated June 16, 1997; which was released by the Video Game History Foundation on November 14, 2022. The other prototype is dated December 26, 1997, and has not been publicly released to date.

== See also ==
- City Crisis
- Streets of SimCity
