= The Yes Men =

Culture jamming activist group

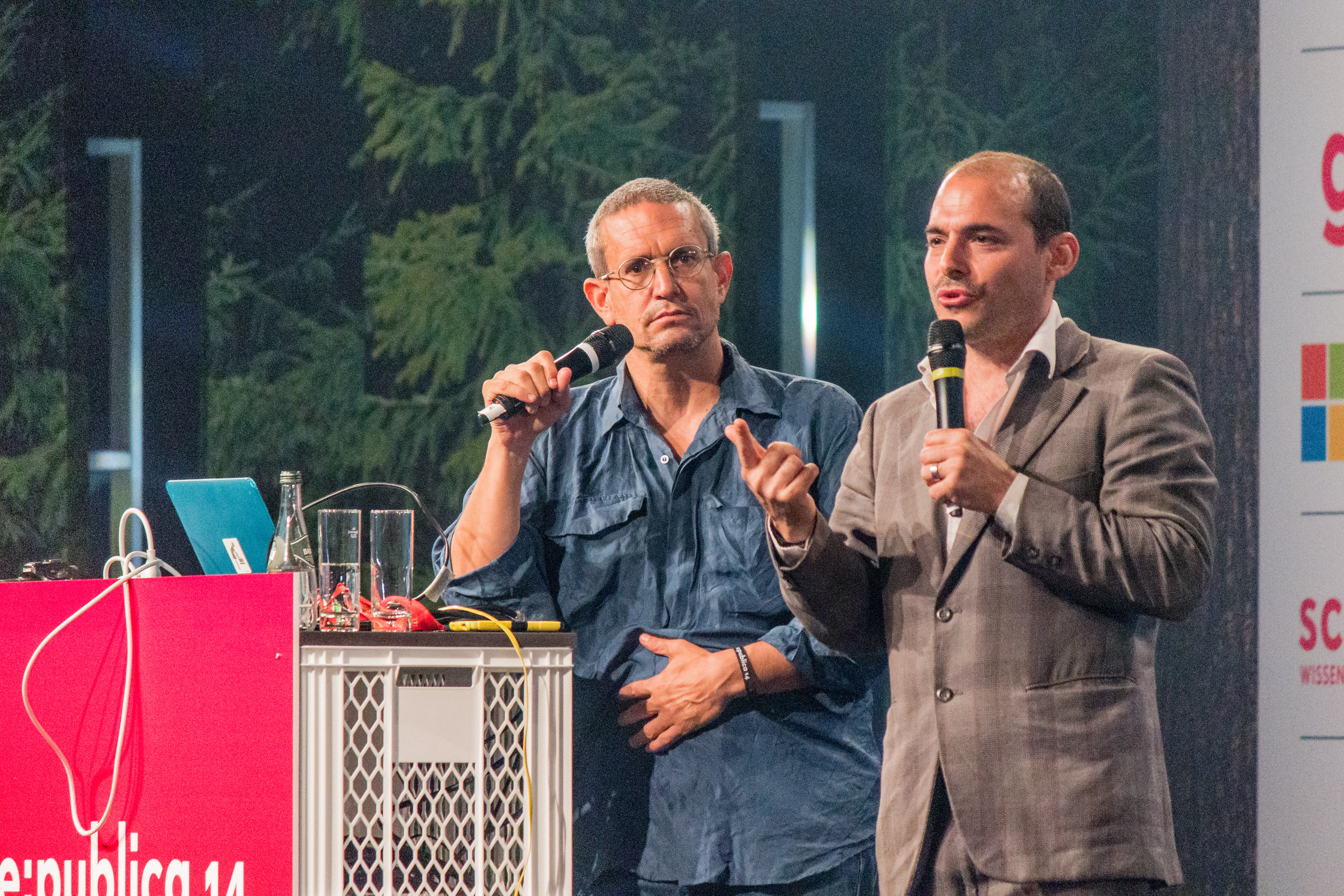
- The Yes Men at re:publica in 2014.
- Formation: 1996
- Founders: Jacques Servin, Igor Vamos
- Type: Advocacy group
- Purpose: Raising awareness of social and political issues through parody and media hoaxes
- Region served: Worldwide
- Website: theyesmen.org

The Yes Men are a group of culture-jamming artist-activists led by Jacques Servin and Igor Vamos. They came to prominence during the 1999 WTO conference in Seattle when they created a fake WTO website. Through parody, the Yes Men aim to raise awareness about problematic social and political issues. They espouse a belief that corporations and governmental organizations often behave in dehumanizing ways toward the public, which can be partly combatted with mocking humor. To date, the group has produced three films: The Yes Men (2003), The Yes Men Fix the World (2009), and The Yes Men Are Revolting (2014). In the films, the Yes Men impersonate corporate and government entities that they dislike, a practice they call "identity correction."

The Yes Men operate under the philosophy that lies can expose truth. In addition to maintaining fake websites, their "hijinks" sometimes entail elaborate props (e.g., Survivaball). The group's antics have brought them media attention and invitations to conferences and TV talk shows. Over the years, Servin and Vamos have collaborated with other like-minded comedic artists, including Improv Everywhere, Andrew Boyd, and Steve Lambert.

== Background ==
According to their web page, the Yes Men originated in 1996. In a 2009 interview, Servin recalled the group's key formative event when they posted a parody website spoofing the World Trade Organization during the 1999 WTO conference in Seattle. To the surprise of Servin and Vamos, many people believed the site (which was disguised to resemble the official WTO website) to be authentic, and the two were contacted to speak at a conference in Austria. As Professor Joan Donovan writes:

This hoax was so successful it landed the Yes Men speaking engagements as the WTO at several conferences around the world. As the absurdity grew, viewers began to question what they saw—which was the point.

Since then, the Yes Men have continued performing large-scale hoaxes, in what they describe as a collaborative effort with journalists to help the media tell important stories.

Servin and Vamos utilize various aliases, most commonly Andy Bichlbaum and Mike Bonanno, who are credited as co-directors of their films. Servin/Bichlbaum is also an author of experimental fiction, and was known as the prankster who inserted images of men kissing in the computer game SimCopter. Vamos is an associate professor of media arts at Rensselaer Polytechnic Institute. The two men have been assisted by a global network of supporters, including part-time member Rocco Ferrer, and "Yes Woman" Whitney Black.

The Yes Men often pose as a powerful entity (typically a corporate executive or government official) and make ridiculous and shocking comments that caricature the ideological position of the organization or person. Given that corporations and governments admit they use "spin" and PR to shape public perceptions, the Yes Men say they are simply deploying spin to their own advantage, and using media outlets to disseminate an anti-corporate worldview. A sense of humor and shock value are usually employed to make these issues more palatable to the public and to bring media attention to stories of interest. Among the Yes Men's more shocking suggestions are to blatantly sell one's vote, and to solve world hunger by having the poor consume recycled human waste. But the Yes Men say that many of their most outlandish proposals hardly evoke any public outrage.

The Yes Men have posed as spokespeople for the WTO, Dow Chemical, McDonald's, the U.S. Department of Housing and Urban Development, the National Rifle Association of America, The New York Times, and Shell Oil. On occasion, the Yes Men's phony spokesperson will make announcements that represent "dream" scenarios for members of the anti-globalization movement, or for opponents of corporate crime. This tactic has often resulted in false news bulletins, such as those reporting the demise of the World Trade Organization, or the announcement that Dow Chemical was paying compensation to the victims of the Bhopal disaster.

The comedy group's experiences were documented in the film The Yes Men, distributed by United Artists, as well as in the Info Wars documentary, and the book The Yes Men: The True Story of the End of the World Trade Organization (ISBN 0-9729529-9-3). The two also directed a 2009 film entitled The Yes Men Fix the World under their aliases Bichlbaum and Bonanno, which premiered at the Sundance Film Festival. In 2009 they launched their online video channel on Babelgum. Their third film, The Yes Men Are Revolting, premiered at the 2014 Toronto International Film Festival.

The Yes Men encourage other activist and student groups to make their voices heard through crashing conferences, creating fake websites, and getting arrested.

== Projects ==
=== George W. Bush ===
One of the Yes Men's first pranks was the satirical website gwbush.com. Established during the 2000 US presidential election with then-computer consultant Zack Exley, the website sought to draw attention to alleged hypocrisies on Bush's actual website. When asked about gwbush.com in a May 1999 press conference, Bush responded that the site had gone too far in criticizing him.

In 2004, the Yes Men went on tour masquerading as the group "Yes, Bush Can!". They encouraged supporters to sign a "Patriot Pledge" agreeing to keep nuclear waste in their back yards and to send their children off to war. The Yes Men appeared at the 2004 Republican National Convention, and drove across the country, initially in an RV with a George W. Bush body wrap, and then in a painted van.

==== Ice Age Petition ====
The Yes Men posed as workers in the 2004 Bush-Cheney reelection campaign. They circulated a petition asking for signatures to support global warming because America's competing countries will suffer, while America will only bear minor side effects.

=== Dow Chemical ===
On December 3, 2004, the 20th anniversary of the Bhopal disaster, Andy Bichlbaum appeared on BBC World as "Jude Finisterra", a Dow Chemical spokesman. Dow is the owner of the Union Carbide Corporation (UCC), the company responsible for the chemical disaster in Bhopal, India on December 3, 1984. An estimated 3,800 people died immediately from the hazardous chemicals and thousands more were killed by the plume from the UCC plant during the next few days. The Indian government reported that more than half a million people were exposed to the gas, leading to numerous early and late health defects. The Bhopal Disaster became one of the worst chemical disasters in history and the name Bhopal became synonymous with industrial catastrophe. Immediately after the disaster, UCC began attempts to dissociate itself from responsibility for the gas leak. The Indian Supreme Court eventually mediated a settlement in which UCC accepted moral responsibility and agreed to pay $470 million to the Indian government to be distributed to claimants as a full and final settlement. The average amount to families of the dead was $2,200. Warren M. Anderson, who led Union Carbide during the Bhopal disaster of 1984, died in 2014 at the age of 92 after fleeing to the U.S.; his wife Lillian stated that her husband Warren had suffered "25 years of unfair treatment."

On their fake Dow Chemical website, the Yes Men said that Dow Chemical Company had no intention whatsoever of repairing the damage. The real company received considerable backlash, and both the real Dow and the phony Dow denied the statements, but Dow took no real action.

The Yes Men decided to pressure Dow further, so as "Finisterra", Bichlbaum went on BBC World News to claim that Dow planned to liquidate Union Carbide and use the resulting $12 billion to pay for medical care, clean up the site, and fund research into the hazards of other Dow products. After two hours of wide coverage, Dow issued a press release denying the statement, stating that they had no employee by that name and he was an impostor, ensuring even greater coverage of the phony news of a cleanup. In Frankfurt, Dow's share price fell 4.24 percent in 23 minutes, wiping $2 billion off its market value. The shares rebounded in Frankfurt after the BBC issued an on-air correction and apology. In New York, Dow Chemical's stock were little changed because of the early trading.

After the original interview was revealed as a hoax, Bichlbaum appeared in a follow-up interview on Channel 4/BBC. He was asked if he had considered the emotions and reaction of the people of Bhopal when producing the hoax. According to the interviewer, "there were many people in tears" upon learning of the hoax. Bichlbaum said that, in comparison, what distress he had caused the people was minimal to that for which Dow was responsible. The Yes Men claim on their website how they were told by contacts in Bhopal that once victims got over their disappointment that the news wasn't real, they were pleased about the stunt and thought it had helped to raise awareness of their plight.

At a banking conference in London on April 28, 2005:

Dow representative Erastus Hamm unveiled Acceptable Risk, the Acceptable Risk Calculator, and the Acceptable Risk mascot–a life-sized golden skeleton named Gilda–to an audience of about 70 banking professionals, including some from Dow's largest investors. Many of the bankers in attendance excitedly signed up for licenses for the Calculator, which helps businesses scientifically determine the point where casualties start to cut into profit, while suggesting the best regions on earth to locate dangerous ventures.

In February 2012, it was reported in the Stratfor email leak that Dow Chemical had hired private intelligence firm Stratfor to monitor the Yes Men.

=== WTO ===
One of the Yes Men's most famous pranks is placing a "corrected" WTO website at https://www.gatt.org (General Agreement on Tariffs and Trade). The fake site began to receive real emails from confused visitors, including invitations to address various elite groups on behalf of the WTO, to which they responded as if they were the actual WTO. At the WTO, the Yes Men gave speeches encouraging corporations to buy votes directly from citizens. They then unveiled a gold spandex body suit that they said would allow productivity to increase, as managers would not have to oversee workers in person but could keep track of them via images on an attached screen as well as implanted sensors.

=== New Orleans and HUD ===
The Yes Men appeared on August 28, 2006, at a "Housing Summit" in New Orleans, taking the stage along with New Orleans Mayor Ray Nagin and Louisiana Governor Kathleen Blanco. Before an audience composed mostly of real estate developers, one of the Yes Men gave a speech in which he claimed to be Rene Oswin, a fictitious "assistant under-secretary" at the U.S. Department of Housing and Urban Development (HUD). In his speech he claimed that HUD would reopen public housing facilities that had been closed since Hurricane Katrina struck in August 2005. He announced this false claim because HUD had recently decided to only rebuild a third of the subsidized housing stock after Katrina, and made plans to demolish four of New Orleans' ten public housing developments, leaving thousands of city residents without homes. This decision was contested locally, nationally, and internationally. So, the Yes Men proclaimed that HUD had changed its mind, and it would not tear down the housing projects in order to replace them with mixed-income developments.

HUD called this prank, which was intended to bring attention to the lack of affordable housing, a "cruel hoax". A former resident of the community was quoted by Bichlbaum as saying, "do whatever's most effective, do it, don't worry about how it affects us. If it draws attention to this, we can handle it. That's all we want, and if there's a few hurt feelings, we can handle it." HUD spokeswoman Donna White said no one named "Rene Oswin" works for the department. White commented, "I'm like, who the heck is that?"

The fictitious Oswin also announced that the big oil companies would contribute some of their record profits to rebuild the wetlands destroyed by the construction of oil tanker canals to prevent the city from being inundated by future hurricanes.

=== ExxonMobil ===
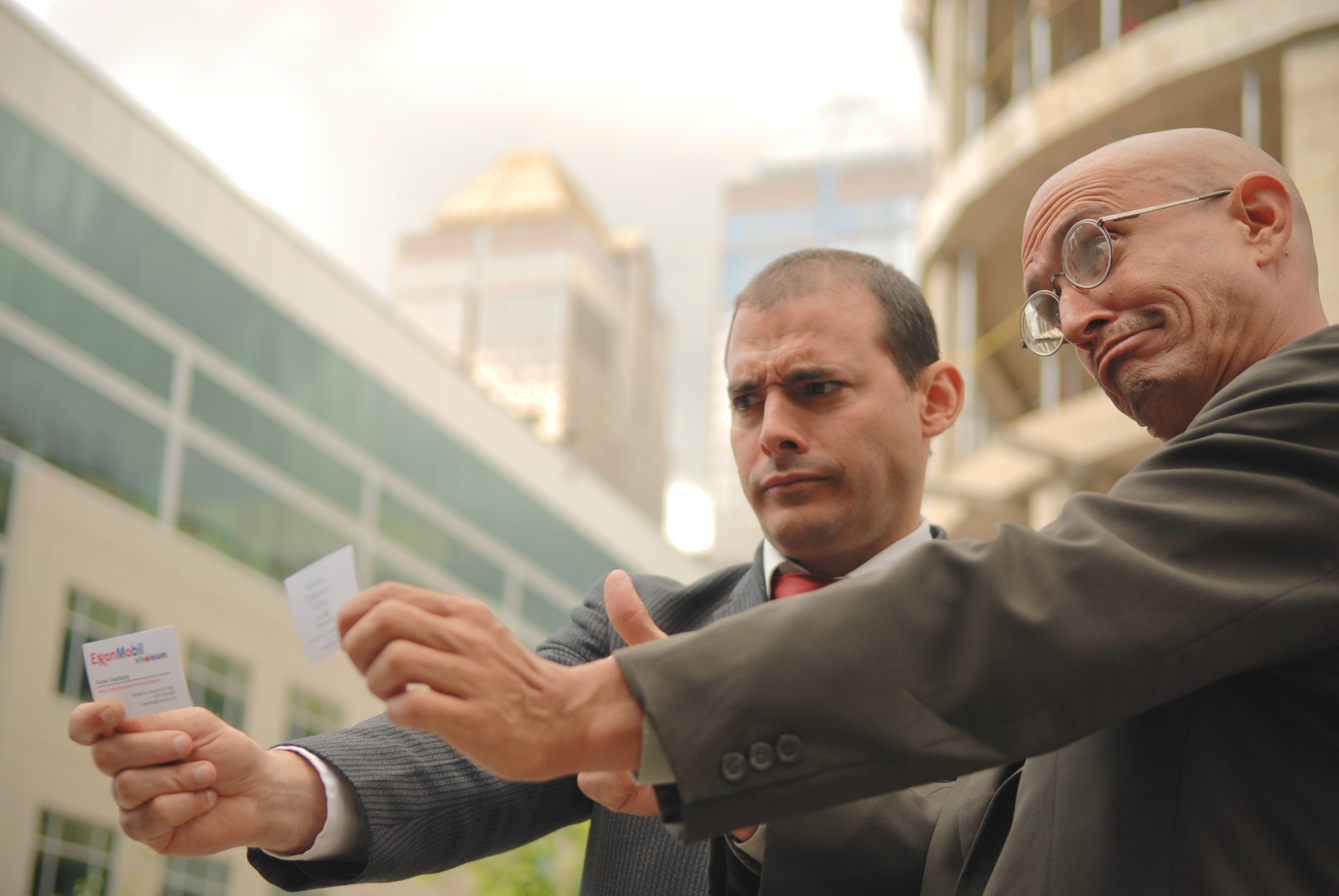
Andy Bichlbaum and Mike Bonanno pose as ExxonMobil executives

On June 14, 2007, the Yes Men acted during the Gas and Oil Exposition (Go-Expo), Canada's largest oil conference in Calgary, Alberta, posing as ExxonMobil and National Petroleum Council (NPC) representatives. In front of more than 300 oilmen, the NPC was expected to deliver the long-awaited conclusions of a study commissioned by U.S. Energy Secretary Samuel Bodman. The NPC is headed by former ExxonMobil CEO Lee Raymond, who is also the chair of the study. When the Yes Men arrived at the conference they said that Lee Raymond (the promised speaker) was unable to make it due to a pressing situation with the president. The Yes Men then went on to give a presentation in place of Lee Raymond.

In the actual speech, the "NPC rep" announced that current U.S. and Canadian energy policies (notably the massive, carbon-intensive processing of Alberta's oil sands, and the development of liquid coal) are increasing the chances of huge global calamities. But he reassured the audience that in the worst-case scenario, the oil industry could "keep fuel flowing" by transforming the billions of people who would die into oil.

The project, called Vivoleum, would work in perfect synergy with the continued expansion of fossil fuel production. The oilmen listened to the lecture with attention, and then lit "commemorative candles". At this point, event security recognized the Yes Men and forced them off stage, and the 'punchline' – that the candles were made of Vivoleum obtained from the flesh of an "Exxon janitor" who died as a result of cleaning up a toxic spill – was not delivered to the audience, but only to reporters.

=== New York Times ===
The Yes Men (along with the Anti-Advertising Agency) also claimed partial responsibility for a prank on November 12, 2008, where approximately 80,000 copies of a fake July 4, 2009 edition of The New York Times were handed out on the streets of New York and Los Angeles. The fake edition shows their ideas for a better future with headlines such as Iraq War Ends and Nation Sets Its Sights on Building Sane Economy. The front page contained a spoofed motto, "All the News We Hope to Print", derived from the Times' well-known phrase, "All the news that's fit to print". Articles in the paper announce dozens of new initiatives, including an establishment of national health care, a maximum wage for C.E.O.s and an article wherein George W. Bush accuses himself of treason for his actions during his years as president. There is also a Reuters photo of the fake cover page and a fake website, http://www.nytimes-se.com/.

Alex S. Jones, a former Times reporter and media scholar, said of the paper, "I would say if you’ve got one, hold on to it...it will probably be a collector's item. I'm just glad someone thinks The New York Times print edition is worthy of an elaborate hoax. A Web spoof would have been infinitely easier. But creating a print newspaper and handing it out at subway stations? That takes a lot of effort."

=== New York Post and SurvivaBall ===
On September 21, 2009, one day before a UN summit lead-up to the United Nations Climate Change Conference 2009, over 2,000 volunteers distributed throughout New York City a 32-page "special edition" of The New York Post, blaring headlines (cover story "We're Screwed") that the city could face deadly heat waves, extreme flooding, and other lethal effects of global warming within the next few decades. The paper had been created by the Yes Men and a coalition of activists as a wake-up call to action on climate change. Other articles describe the Pentagon's alarmed response to global warming, the U.S. government's minuscule response, China's advanced alternative energy program, and how the COP15 in Copenhagen could be a "Flopenhagen". There was also a fake "nypost-se.com" website. A "climate change horoscope", satirically based on Sally Brompton's daily horoscope in the Post, was commissioned from an environmental activist horoscope writer but was not published.

On September 22, 2009, the Yes Men demonstrated, on the alleged behalf of Halliburton and other energy corporations, an inflatable ball-shaped costume known as the SurvivaBall. The Yes Men claimed it was a self-contained living system for surviving disasters caused by global warming. Over 20 people wore SurvivaBall costumes during the event staged along the East River. Police shut down the demonstration for lack of a permit. Co-founder of the Yes Men, Andy Bichlbaum, was arrested on an outstanding parking ticket charge and a handful of other Yes Men were served with summons and tickets for disorderly behavior and creating hazardous conditions.

The SurvivaBall was also used in a protest at the steps of the Capitol in Washington, D.C. The protesting balls demanded action be taken on global warming to achieve the 350.org goal. The Yes Men's strategy was to block the entrance until the U.S. federal government comes to a binding agreement on climate change.

=== US Chamber of Commerce ===
On October 19, 2009, the Yes Men spoofed the United States Chamber of Commerce, declaring a U-turn on their climate change policy. The Yes Men were not able to complete the conference without being exposed as a hoax, although their message that the United States Chamber of Commerce needs to reevaluate their direction in terms of clean energy was their primary concern and was received. Major TV and news organisations carried this story briefly before the hoax was uncovered. The US Chamber of Commerce two weeks later did change their official policy though, according to Al Gore it was "not because of" the Yes Men's stunt. The Chamber launched a trademark and copyright infringement lawsuit against The Yes Men, who were defended by the Electronic Frontier Foundation. The suit was dropped in June 2013.

This action appears in their film, The Yes Men Are Revolting.

=== Canadian environment minister ===
During the 2009 United Nations Climate Change Conference in Copenhagen, the Yes Men put out a statement in which they purported to be the Canadian environment minister, Jim Prentice. The statement pledged to cut carbon emissions by 40% below 1990 levels by 2020. The statement was followed by a response from the Ugandan delegation, praising the statement, that was also faked. Another fake statement was then put out blasting the falsehoods of the original fake statement. A fake story in a European edition of the Wall Street Journal was also posted online. Jim Prentice described the hoax as "undesirable".

=== Niger Delta hoax ===
On March 28, 2010, a video was released on YouTube with the title "Shell: We are sorry". A man called Bradford Houppe, from the Ethical Affairs Committee at Royal Dutch Shell gave a four-minute-long apology to the people of the Niger Delta for ruining their land, water, and communities. This video was created in response to the numerous environmental problems and human rights violations that have occurred in the Niger Delta region of Nigeria since Shell began oil exploration in the region decades ago. Shell has yet to make any official statement about this video.

=== GE tax refund hoax reported by the AP ===
On April 13, 2011, a hoax website with a URL similar to that of the GE press domain (genewscenter.com) designed to look like the GE news center website. The hoax site posted the claim "GE Responds to Public Outcry – Will Donate Entire $3.2 Billion Tax Refund to Help Offset Cuts and Save American Jobs." and it seems that the AP reported the story as fact, as reported by Good.

=== Shell Oil and ArcticReady.com ===
In June 2012, the Yes Men collaborated with Greenpeace and members of the Occupy Seattle movement to create ArcticReady.com, a parody website criticizing Shell Oil's drilling activities in the Arctic Circle. The website launch was commemorated by a fake launch party held in the Seattle Space Needle. Shell Oil disavowed any affiliation with the website or the launch party on June 14, 2012.

=== The Action Switchboard ===
The Action Switchboard is a platform the Yes Men launched to link up people who want to be involved in activism events with people organising them. As it says "The Action Switchboard is a platform that helps activists find each other, come up with direct action ideas, and get the resources they need to pull them off."

=== Edward Snowden Politicon interview ===
In October 2015, at the annual Politicon non-partisan political convention, the Yes Men promoted an interview with whistleblower Edward Snowden, known to be living in exile in Russia. As they introduced the interview, they announced that Snowden had been pardoned and would join the group in person. As Snowden appeared before them, people cheered, applauded and many rushed the stage for photos. A short time later, another Edward Snowden appeared on the giant screen; however, this time, it was the real Edward Snowden from Russia.

=== Politicon: new DNC platform ===
In July 2017, The Yes Men pranked the Democratic Party at Politicon. Following up the "Better Deal" agenda released by the party a week earlier, prankster Andy Bichlbaum posed as Frank Spencer, Deputy Vice Chair for Civic Engagement of the Democratic National Committee (DNC). As part of the new #DNCTakeBack campaign, Spencer pushed a more ambitious and progressive Democratic agenda, including: Medicare for all, tuition-free college, public campaign financing, stronger unions, an end to corporate lobbying and the end of for-profit prisons.

=== VW/Dieselgate apology ===
In November 2018, Motherboard/Vice released a video about The Yes Men and their fake VW "Emissions Anonymous" project. In the prank, they apologize to the public for the Dieselgate emissions scandal, in which several models and years of VW car family diesel autos were engineered and built with a rigged emissions system that ran clean only while under test conditions, but otherwise released high levels of air pollutants. The Houston Chronicle even covered the pranksters' April 2018 entry in Houston's annual Art Car Parade as an official VW PR campaign: "The marketing department has even turned the crisis into a publicity shtick".

=== Fake Washington Post edition ===
On January 16, 2019, parody editions of The Washington Post were distributed in Washington, D.C. Dated May 1, 2019, the edition's headline read "UNPRESIDENTED" and the lead article described Donald Trump's resignation from the presidency after a period of unrest. The Yes Men took credit for the edition.

=== COP26 ===
In November 2021, for the United Nations COP26 climate action summit in Glasgow, the pranksters shared news of a private jet interior design company's membership in the UN's ‘Race to Zero’ program, convincing some that they'd trolled the gathering by getting their fake company admitted. The prank was highlighting the absurdity that such a company actually exists and is a member of a net-zero program.

== See also ==
- The Revolution Will Be Televised (2012–2015)
