= Igor Vamos =

American comedian and activist

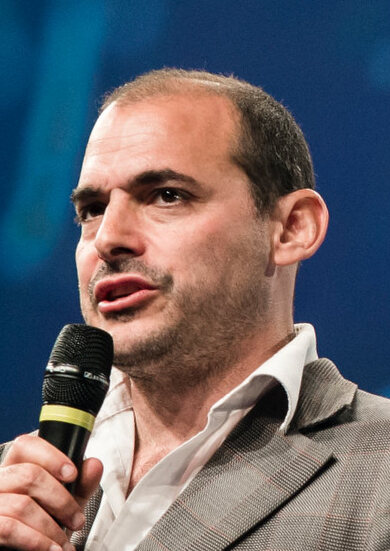
- Igor Vamos, in 2014
- Born: April 15, 1968 (age 58)
- Education: Reed College
- Occupations: Comedian, Activist
- Known for: Yes Men

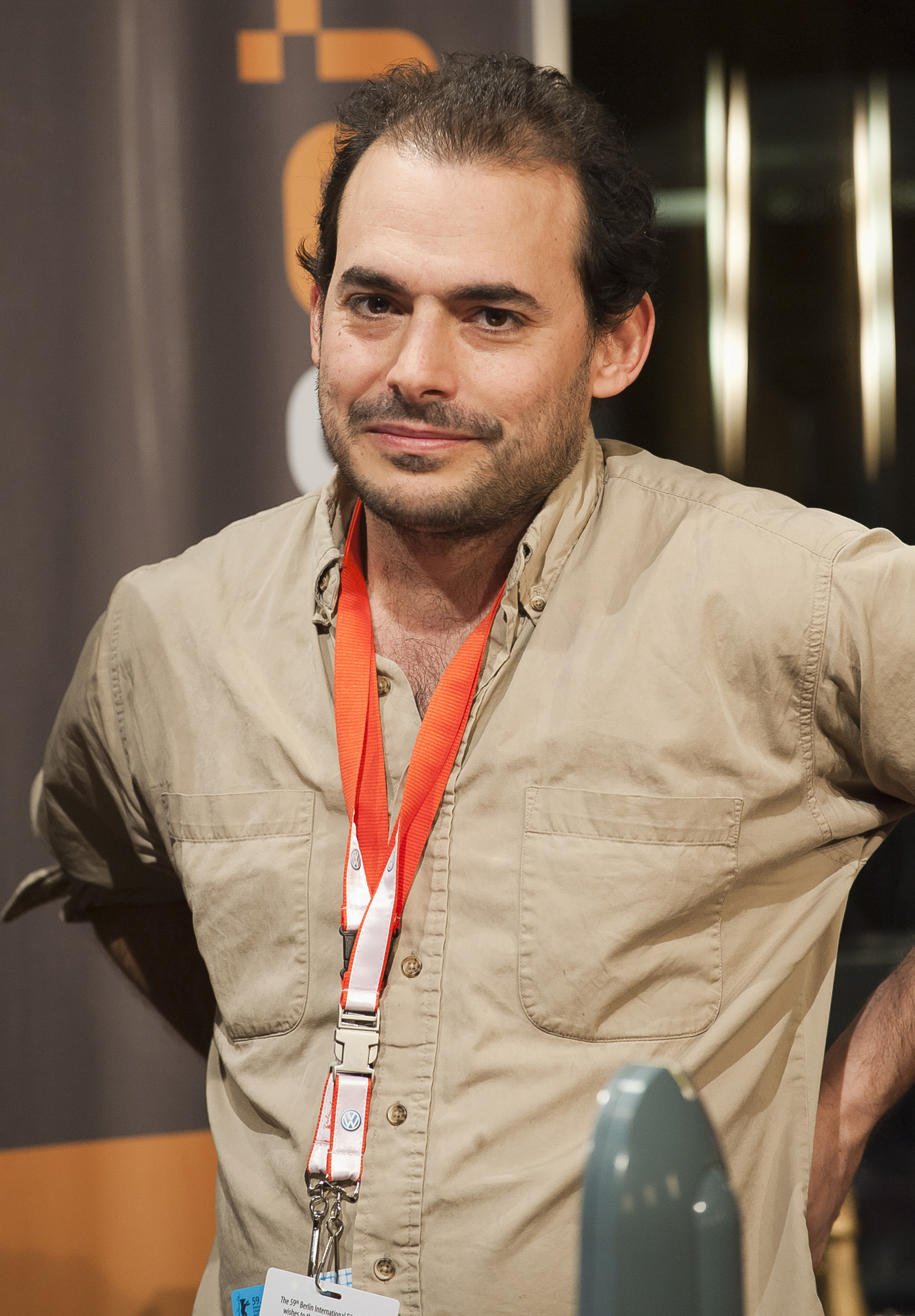
Igor Vamos at the 59th Berlin International Film Festival (2009)

Igor Vamos (born April 15, 1968) is a member of The Yes Men (using the alias Michael "Mike" Bonanno), and an associate professor of media arts at Rensselaer Polytechnic Institute. In 2000, he received the Creative Capital award in the discipline of Emerging Fields. He is also a co-founder of RTmark and the recipient of a 2003 Guggenheim Fellowship, granted for a project that used Global Positioning System (GPS) and other wireless technology to create a new medium with which to "view" his documentary Grounded, about an abandoned military base in Wendover, Utah.

In 1990, Vamos earned an undergraduate degree in Studio Art from Reed College in Portland, Oregon. He later earned an MFA in Visual Arts from the University of California, San Diego. While at Reed, Vamos organized a student group called Guerrilla Theater of the Absurd. They performed and documented "culture jamming" acts of protest, including Reverse Peristalsis Painters, where 24 people in suits stood outside the downtown venue of Dan Quayle's fundraiser for Oregon senator Bob Packwood and drank ipecac, forcing themselves to vomit the red, white and blue remains of the mashed potatoes and food coloring they had consumed earlier; and a middle of the night contribution to the debate over renaming Portland's Martin Luther King Jr. Boulevard, wherein the city awoke to find that all of the street signs and freeway exits for another major boulevard had been changed to read "Malcolm X Street."

Vamos made Le petomane: Fin de siècle fartiste (1998) about the French flatulist and entertainer Joseph Pujol, a parody in the style of a PBS documentary. Another early project was the "Barbie Liberation Organization", where Vamos and his cohorts purchased three hundred Barbie and G.I. Joe dolls, exchanged their electronic voice boxes, and then returned them to the stores; the soldiers ended up saying, "Let's go shopping!", and the Barbies exclaimed, "Vengeance is mine!". It was a small-scale project, and few people found themselves in possession of the switched dolls. The stunt nevertheless attracted national media attention.

Vamos presented the Reed College Commencement Speech on May 19, 2014, where he announced that the college had decided to divest from fossil fuels, a decision the college had in fact not made.
