= The Thing (art project) =

Art project

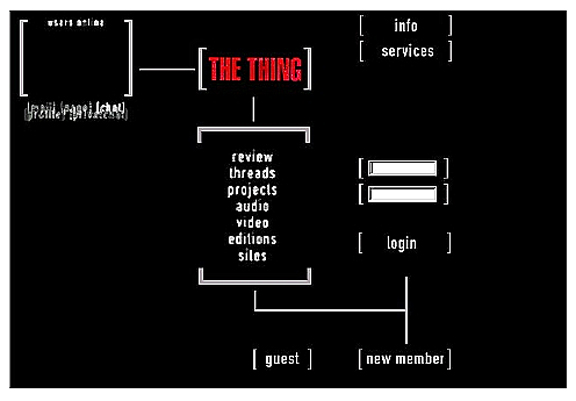
The Thing website (circa 1998)

The Thing is an international net-community of artists and art-related projects that was started in 1991 by Wolfgang Staehle. The Thing was launched as an email mailbox system accessible over the telephone line network in New York City feeding a Bulletin Board System (BBS) in 1991 before their website was launched in 1995 on the World Wide Web. By the late 1990s, The Thing grew into a diverse online community made up of dozens of members' Web sites, mailing lists, a successful Web hosting service, a community studio in Chelsea, Manhattan, and the first website devoted to Net Art: bbs.thing.net.

== History ==
=== The Thing BBS (1991) ===
In 1991, The Thing began as a Bulletin Board System (BBS) focusing on contemporary art and cultural theory. In 1990, the writer and art curator/critic Blackhawk (aka Peter Von Brandenburg), having curated the Power for Peace: Our Lost Horizon art exhibition at White Columns and produced the cyberpunk documentary film Cyberpunk directed by Marianne Trench, taught Wolfgang Staehle many of the abilities he needed to start the original The Thing BBS. Blackhawk was the first person Staehle turned to after conceiving the idea for an electronic culture resource based on the model of Joseph Beuys's Social sculpture. Blackhawk and Wolfgang jointly set up the editorial structure of the original BBS and planned for many of the then experimental activities that took place. Other people who helped develop and shape the content of the early BBS included Josefina Ayerza, Dike Blair, Donald Newman, the original programmer, Jordan Crandall, David Platzker, Josh Decter, Rainer Ganahl, Julia Scher, Barry Schwabsky, Morgan Garwood, Franz von Stauffenberg and Benjamin Weil.

A second node, The Thing Cologne, was added in 1992, followed by The Thing Vienna in November 1993. Nodes in Berlin and elsewhere were soon to follow.

=== The Thing on the Web (1995) ===
The Thing changed its form when a website was created for a presentation at the 1995 Ars Electronica. Credits on the 1995 website also name Nicky Chaikin, John F. Simon Jr., Wolfgang Staehle, Rob Keenan, Darryl Erentzen and John Rabasa.

In 1995 The Thing set up an independent art network with hardware of its own that offered arts communities ways to establish themselves, to send information to one another and also to conceive of new artistic practices deriving from conceptual art and from performance art. The idea was that working with the Internet was a way to operate around the institutions of art distribution of the day.

In 1998 Max Kossatz designed The Thing Communicator a website mimicking many functions of the original BBS including member login, chat and messaging.

The most interactive area of The Thing consisted of various message boards offering forums for art theory debate, news and gossip, ongoing dialogue and an open-access flow of information as well as several online versions of art journals.

Alongside discussion forums The Thing has offered artworks in the form of graphics downloadable to the home personal computer – for example by Peter Halley.

=== thing.net communities ===
The Thing has enabled a diverse group of artists, critics, curators, and activists to use the internet in its early stages. At its core, The Thing is a social network, made up of individuals from diverse backgrounds with a wide range of expert knowledge. From this social hub, The Thing has built an array of programs and initiatives, in both technological and cultural networks. During its first five years, TT became widely recognized as one of the founding and leading online centers for new media culture. Its activities include hosting artists' projects and mailing lists - as well as publishing cultural criticism.

The Thing has also organized many public events and symposia on such topics as the state of new media arts, the preservation of online privacy, artistic innovations in robotics, and the possibilities of community empowerment through wireless technologies.

In 1997, thing.net communications, LLC, an internet service provider (ISP) was incorporated by Wolfgang Staehle, Gisela Ehrenfried and Max Kossatz. The ISP was to provide a financial backbone for The Thing Inc. (a 501 c 3 non profit organization). thing.net has hosted arts and activist groups and publications including P.S.1 Contemporary Art Center, Artforum, Mabou Mines, Willoughby Sharp Gallery, Zingmagazine, Journal of Contemporary Art, RTMark and Tenant.net.

Among many others, artists and projects associated with thing.net have included Sawad Brooks, Heath Bunting, Cercle Ramo Nash, Vuk Cosic, Ricardo Dominguez, Ursula Endlicher, etoy, GH Hovagimyan, Jérôme Joy, John Klima, Jenny Marketou, Mariko Mori, Olivier Mosset, Prema Murty, Mark Napier, Joseph Nechvatal, Phil Niblock, Daniel Pflumm, Francesca da Rimini, Beat Streuli and Beth Stryker.

== The Thing global ==
- The Thing Amsterdam was founded by Walter van der Cruijsen
- The Thing Basel was founded by Barbara Strebel and Rik Gelles
- The Thing Berlin was founded by Ulf Schleth
- The Thing Cologne was founded by Michael Krome
- The Thing Düsseldorf was founded by Jörg Sasse
- The Thing Frankfurt was founded by Andreas Kallfelz
- The Thing Hamburg (1993–94) was founded by Hans-Joachim Lenger
- The Thing Hamburg (2006–2009) was founded by the local art association "THE THING HAMBURG"
- The Thing London was founded by Andreas Ruethi
- The Thing New York was founded by Wolfgang Staehle
- The Thing Stockholm was founded by Magnus Borg
- The Thing Vienna was founded by Helmut Mark and Max Kossatz
- The Thing Roma was founded by Marco Deseriis and Giuseppe Marano

== Footnotes ==
This article incorporates text from "About: The Thing" and "Wolfgang Staehle: Resume", publications released into public domain by their author.
