= Fran Ilich =

Mexican writer and media artist (born 1975)

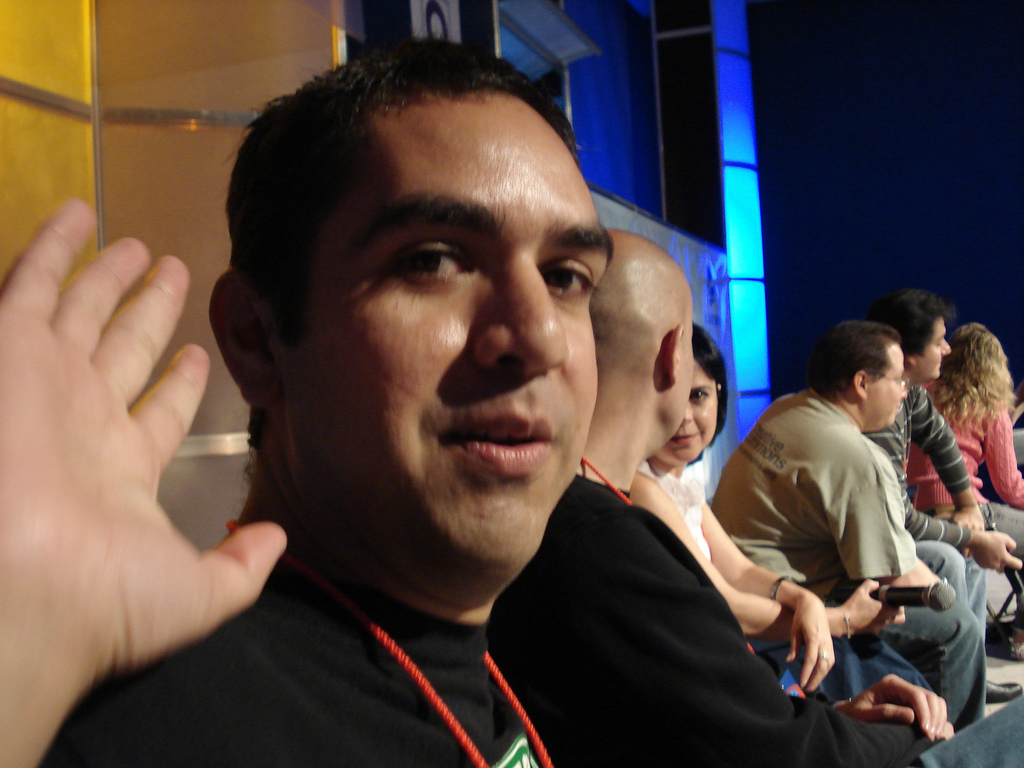
- Fran Ilich at Web 2.0 panel in ITESM
- Born: Fran Ilich Morales Muñoz; Tijuana, Baja California, Mexico
- Other name: Ilich Sabotage
- Occupations: Activist, entrepreneur, media-artist, writer
- Years active: 1990–present
- Website: franilich.com

Fran Ilich Morales Muñoz (born 1975 in Tijuana) is a Mexican writer and media artist who principally works on the theory and practice of narrative media. Since 2010 Ilich lives in New York City.

== Education ==
Fran Ilich studied Latin American Studies at Alliant International University, and obtained a master's degree in Art History and Media at the Danube University Krems in Austria, where he held the 2010 Leonardo Foundation scholarship.

== Career ==
During the early 1990s he co-founded the Contra-Cultura (menor) collective and was involved in the independent media scene in Tijuana—mainly the cyberpunk scene—where he was known to be an eclectic producer working with literature, photography, comics, videofilms and electronic music. Because of this, he was identified as part of the Generation X of Mexican literature, with other writers such as Guillermo Fadanelli and Naief Yehya.

=== Writing, screenwriting and editing ===
In 1995 he began publishing Cinemátik, a printed tabloid on urban electronic culture. In 1996 he was a screenwriter for Discovery Channel Interacción, a show produced by Beatriz Acevedo.

In 1997 he published his first novel, Metro-Pop.

In 1998 he was signed by Digital Entertainment Network as creator for a series of 6-minute shows targeting young Latino audiences. However, the series never was produced, as the multimedia dot-com company and internet pioneer went bankrupt.

In 2000 he moved to Mexico City to become an editor for the magazine Sputnik Cultura Digital.

In 2004 he was included in the anthology Historias para habitar, published by Ediciones SM.

In 2007 the magazine he edited, Sab0t, was presented at Documenta 12 magazines. This same year his novel Tekno Guerrilla, a story about the HEM (Hecho En México) graffiti crew in Tijuana, was published by Verbigracia (Basque Country). His novel Circa 94 was published in Mexico in 2010 and won the Premio Binacional de Novela Joven Frontera de Palabras/Border of words award.

His last book was an extended essay on radical political imagination and narrative across media. Titled "Otra Narr@tiva es Posible: La imaginacion política en la era del internet" (Another Narr@tive is Possible: Political Imagination in the Internet Age). It was published by Recovecos in Argentina in 2011 and the Institute of Network Cultures in Amsterdam.

=== Organizing ===
In 1998 year, along with other members of Laboratorios Cinemátik, he produced Cinemátik 1.0, which is considered to be the first cyberculture festival in Latin America. He was part of the initial group of artists and producers who founded Nortec, though he distanced himself from this scene in 1999 and moved to Berlin. There, he became involved with Nettime, collaborating with Florian Schneider, Geert Lovink, Natalie Bookchin, Pit Schultz, Ricardo Dominguez and Alexei Shulgin.

In 2000 Ilich initiated the Borderhack festival on the Mexican side of the Tijuana-San Diego border wall.

=== Art ===
As an artist, Ilich has presented his work as a media artist at cultural institutions and international art and media festivals throughout Europe and the Americas, for example Transmediale, Ars Electronica, Berlinale Talent Campus, Walker Art Center, InSite 05, Copenhagen International Documentary Film Festival, Streaming Cinema Festival, Antidoto at Itau Cultural, International Festival of New Film Split, Salón Internacional de Arte Digital de la Habana, among others. In 2011 he was a Fellow at Eyebeam, and in 2014 a Fellow of A Blade of Grass.

In 2012, Fran Ilich co-created an early Bitcoin-related conceptual art performance titled “Blockchain Performance”, as co-production of Artistic Bokeh & Spacebank in which 20 Ai Weiwei Sunflower Seeds have been purchased with the transaction 61e545ea577e4a3ff5b98e845bc0671c2a08bc3b95b07a8c9b10833314158f8b.

=== Teaching and research ===
Ilich has directed seminars on digital media interdisciplinary narrative in Seville, Spain and Odense, Denmark. He was an invited professor in the Latinamerican Studies masters programme at Universität Wien and Latinameirika Institut in Austria, and Digital Storytelling course in Malmö Högskola, Sweden.

== Activism ==
In 2005, after attending the meetings of the Sixth Declaration of the Lacandon Jungle in Chiapas with Subcomandante Marcos and the EZLN, Ilich launched the autonomous server possibleworlds.org and its economic body spacebank.org.

In 2009 he was a keynote speaker at the EZLN's first Festival Mundial de la Digna Rabia (first World Festival of Dignified Rage) on a panel on "Other communication, other culture", along with Subcomandante Marcos, Comandante Zebedeo, Hermann Bellinghausen, Gloría Muñoz, Sergío Ramírez Lazcano, Francisco Barrios "El Mastuerzo" and Roco of Maldita Vecindad. He also worked on worked on a telenovela, animations, and podcasts, to contribute to the Zapatista's efforts to create a grassroots, less vertical form of culture (otra cultura).

Since 2010 Ilich has focused on the cooperative Diego de la Vega and its virtual community investment bank Spacebank, presenting these projects at The Economist 2011 conference in Mexico City, "Change from the Bottom Up". Spacebank, which he promoted at Occupy Wallstreet, was an effort at subverting the financial status quo, with the motto "Don’t hate the banks, become the banks". Diego de la Vega is a coffee co-op which caters Zapatista-grown coffee in New York area events such as the South Bronx holiday market.

He has coordinated workshops such as Youth Creating and Communicating on hiv/aids, sponsored by UNESCO and aimed for homeless children.
