= Natalie Bookchin =

American artist

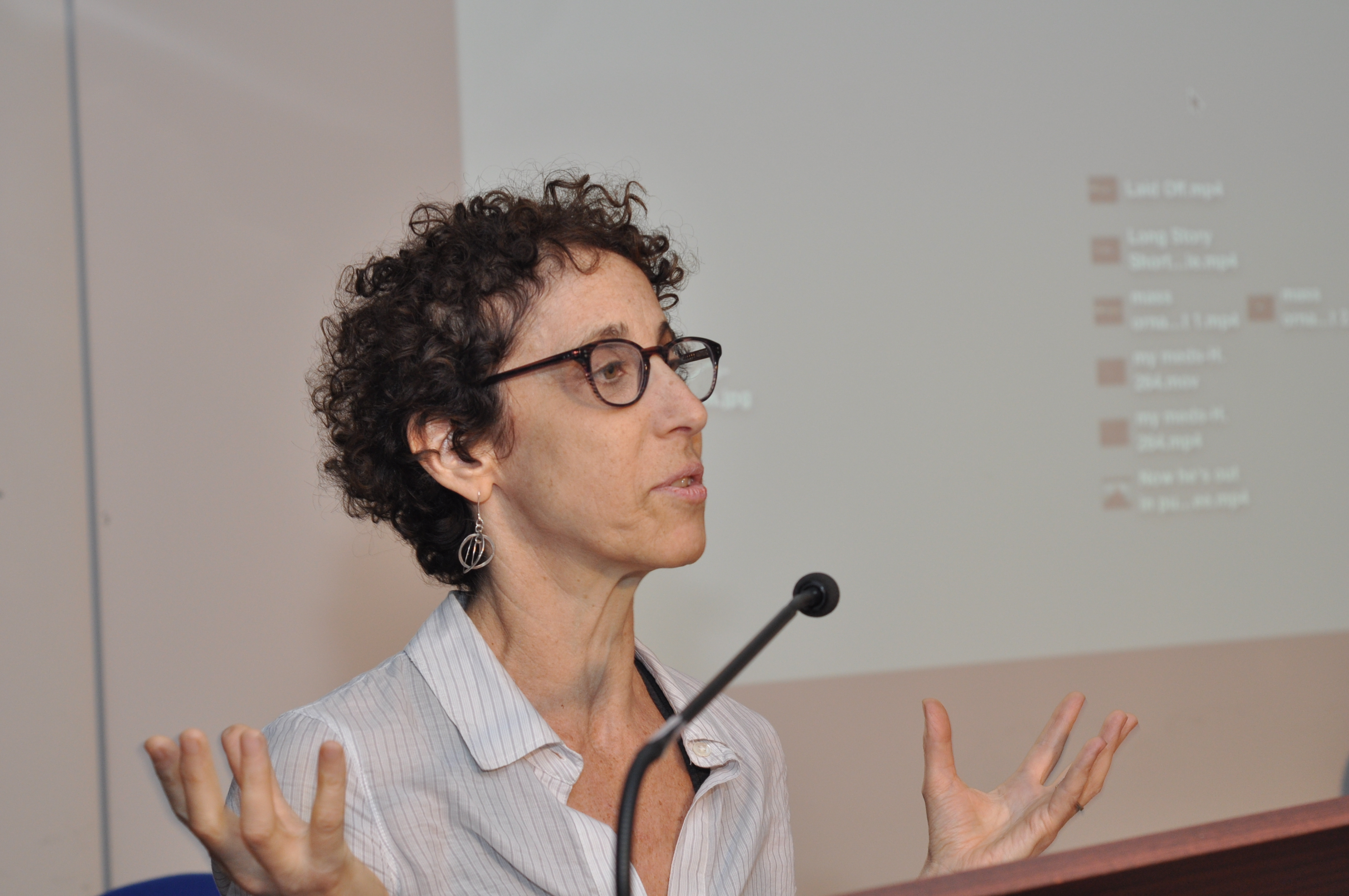
- Education: MFA, School of the Art Institute of Chicago (1990); Whitney Independent Study Program, New York BFA, State University of New York (1984)
- Known for: Media Arts
- Notable work: Long Story Short, net.net.net, Metapet, Mass Ornament, Testament, The Intruder
- Awards: Guggenheim Fellowship (2001), MacArthur Documentary Film Fund grant (2012), Creative Capital
- Website: bookchin.net

Natalie Bookchin is an American artist based in Brooklyn, New York. She is well known for her work in media. She was a 2001-2002 Guggenheim Fellow. Her work is exhibited at institutions including PS1, Massachusetts Museum of Contemporary Art, the Museum of Contemporary Art in Barcelona, KunstWerke, Berlin, the Generali Foundation, Vienna, the Walker Art Center, the Whitney Museum of American Art, and the Shedhale in Zurich. Her works are in a variety of forms – from online computer games, collaborative performances and "hacktivist" interventions, to interactive websites and widely distributed texts and manifestos. In her work, she explores some of the far-reaching consequences of Internet and digital technologies on a range of spheres, including aesthetics, labor, leisure, and politics. Much of Bookchin's later works amass excerpts from video blogs or YouTube found online. From 1998 to 2000 she was a member of the collective RTMark, and was involved in the gatt.org prank they organized spoofing the 1999 General Agreement on Tariffs and Trade talks

She received a bachelor's degree from the State University of New York at Purchase in 1984 and a master's degree in photography from the School of the Art Institute of Chicago in 1990. She participated in the Independent Study Program at Whitney Museum of American Art from 1991 to 1992.

In 2015, she was appointed to associate chair of the Visual Arts Department at the Rutgers Mason Gross School of the Arts. Prior to that she was serving as the co-director of the Photography and Media Program in the Art School at California Institute of the Arts. She has also previously taught at the University of California, San Diego.

Bookchin's work The Intruder was included in the Chicago New Media 1973-1992 Exhibition, curated by jonCates The work combines a game-like structure with narrative elements, drawing upon a short story by Jorge Luis Borges, and is often discussed in the context of electronic literature.

== Works ==
- The Intruder web project (1999): web-based hybrid interactive narrative art game that merges computer games and literature based on 1966 short story by Jorge Luis Borges, also titled "The Intruder".
- BioTaylorism (2000): PowerPoint Presentation collaboration with Jin Lee.
- Homework (1997): online collaborative project that Bookchin developed with students and colleagues.
- Marking Time (1997): motion-study installation that presents the story of three Arkansas prison prisoners four days before their death. This interactive installation includes text projections on the wall, as well as a video of one of the inmates' face on a computer monitor.
- <net.net.net> (1990-2000): eight-month series of lectures and workshops on art, activism, and the Internet at Cal Arts, MOCA in Los Angeles, and in Tijuana (the latter with collaboration of Fran Ilich & Laboratorios Cinemátik). Lecturers included Critical Art Ensemble, Alexei Shulgin, Jenny Marketou, Geert Lovink, Mongrel, RTmark, Fiambrera, Vuk Ćosić, Olia Lialina, Florian Schneider, Rachel Baker, and Heath Bunting.
- Searching for the Truth24 (2000) was reviewed by Joan Campas who explains that this work is a white screen with nine numbers that link to various searches based on Truth and compares "the absolutely huge (Cyberspace) with the infinitely small (the internaut)" or internet reader.
- agoraXchange (2004-2008): net-based project created with Jackie Stevens and commissioned by the Tate Online.
- Round the World (2007): 4-channel video installation that projects webcam footage from around the world on four screens/walls, accompanied by a fictional tour narrated by Thomas Edison in 1988. This video installation is a part of Bookchin's security webcam series: Network Movies (2005-2007).
- Zorns Lemma2 (2007, 12 min.): single-channel silent video remake of Hollis Frampton's Zorns Lemma (1970). Bookchin replaces the English signs in Frampton's film with signs in different languages from around the world.
- All That Is Solid (Location Insecure) (2006, 10.5 min.): single-channel video that compiles excerpts from private security webcams (found through hacks). This video is a part of Bookchin's security webcam series: Network Movies (2005-2007).
- Parking Lot (2008, 12-13 min.): video compilation of parking lot spaces.
- trip (2008, 63 min.): single-channel digital video that compiles excerpts from YouTube travel clips.
- Mass Ornament (2009): single-channel video installation that displays hundreds of excerpts of YouTube dance videos. The work is titled after Siegfried Kracauer's "The Mass Ornament."
- Testament (2009): 4-channel video installation that compiles excerpts from video blogs, each channel presents a distinct theme: My Meds, Laid Off, I Am Not.
- Now he's out in public and everyone can see (2012): 18-channel video installation. This installation compiles excerpts from hundreds of video blogs concerning media scandals surrounding one of four African American public figures.
- Long Story Short (coming soon): video-installation, documentary, and web project that discusses experiences of poverty in the US.
