= Hell.com =

Website domain

HELL.COM
- Owner: NA MEDIA
- Creator: Kenneth Aronson

Hell.com is a domain name that achieved a degree of notoriety due to its name, and an intentionally mysterious website that existed there from August 1995 to 2009 created by the first registrant of the domain, artist Kenneth Aronson. The domain was sold by Aronson in 2009.

== Under Aronson ownership ==
Several versions of the Hell.com website were created during Aronson's ownership of the domain. All the designs in the areas generally available to the public were simple and sparse, but employed mysterious text, purposefully difficult navigation and JavaScript tricks to create an intriguing experience that suggested something deeper, and which appealed to curious visitors, hackers, and others.

The site was described as "a very private and somewhat mysterious place for Net-artists to hang out and create Web-art [or Net-art, as it was called in the late 1990s], without being directly visible to the grand public."

A more jaundiced view was that Aronson had simply chanced upon an available domain, and decided to use it for Web art that provoked curiosity, entertained, and "messed with the visitors' heads."

A commercial art gallery that represented Aronson stated: "Hell.com stood as an iconic example of the potential for avant-garde expression in the digital realm. It is remembered as a piece of internet history that symbolized an era of online creativity and mystery."

There was certainly much speculation over the site's purpose, which was further fuelled by Aronson's public statements. In an interview with the New York Times in 1998 he suggested Hell.com was "a vast creative project that exists in a secret online location, a private digital environment assembled over the past year by 50 new media artists who continue to collaborate on its chaotic shape and ever-changing content. "The concept was to create the Web as I'd like it to be, something that's fascinating, exciting, dangerous, interesting...a parallel Web"

A sub-domain of Hell.com, bat.hell.com stated:

HELL.COM is a private parallel network of acknowledged visionaries with diverse skillsets working from 20 nations. Described as the 'bleeding edge of the web' by the BBC, the project has been pushing the boundaries of the internet to discover new levels of human communication.

— BAT.hell.com text, HELL

It was surmised that Hell.com's members, at least partially, were creative designers specialising in creating sites like Hell.com which were abstract, dark, intractable, and mysterious. At least four projects ran on Hell.com: (e.g. "surface" and "HL2"), where members anonymously collaborated in their creation. The end-results were non-informative webpages like Hell.com's for people's viewing pleasure (HL2 apparently took 90 minutes to explore). However these creative projects seemed to be only one facet of the larger Hell.com group.

Aronson also sold @hell.com email addresses through the site.

=== Layouts ===
In 1994-1995, Hell.com only displayed a warning that you were not invited and to go away.

In 1996, Hell.com displayed a blank black page with a single small red link in the center called 'that'. In the original design, the index page featured a random aphorism in place of the logo. The aphorism took a visitor to a page that consisted of three links:

- "no access"
  Featured a black background with the Hell.com logo (a white circle with an arrow pointing down in its centre) which linked to:
  - Disclaimer page
    The writing stated that "this is a parallel web. there is no public access. the waiting list is approximately 18-22 months." There were two further links; "apply"- which allowed the visitor to enter an email address to receive an email asking for a payment, and "don't"- which closed the window
- "redemption"
  Contained a red link called "soul redemption program". The link sent the visitor to:
  - Questions page
    A Flash page in which hundreds of questions flew towards the user through black space. Clicking one of them provided an "answer." A link to the left reading "Yes" passed onto the Payment page. Other versions featured a series of texts that included: "if you want to change things...you have to start somewhere", and "once you are willing, it no longer has any value," with a bolded link: **"do it"**. This went to a page that warned "all payments are final", with a link "ok" taking the user to a credit card payment form.
    - Payment page
      This was a set of a few pages whereby, after several warnings that the payment is real, the user could fill out a form to donate for a range of amount options from $10 to $10,000, and which later changed to $20, $200 or $2,000.
- "search"
  Added on February 8, 2006, this link lead to the Search Page
  Contained a seemingly normal Google search box; however, certain "keywords" typed in the box took the user to other pages. Known "keywords" were:
    - redemption
      Linked to the Questions Page
    - hell
      Linked to the Links Page
    - answer
      This link first led to a picture of a bald, naked woman falling through darkness. Soon after that, the link sent the user to a "sister site" called cygne-noir.com. It was mostly in the same format of Hell.com and acted as a portfolio for Kenneth Aronson. The portfolio described Aronson as "A conceptual artist who uses photography as part of his process. His digital work has been featured at The Brooklyn Academy of Music, The Absolut LA international, Robert Berman Gallery, Montreal International Film Festival, as well as exhibitions in the UK, France, Italy, Spain, Korea, and Mexico." According to Aronson's personal site, he is the "CEO/ Founder of this parallel network/ [Hell.com] which is considered the enigma of the web", further backing up the notion that Hell.com is net.art.
- In 2010, Hell.com featured the original logo, which lead to similar page with the seemingly holographic logo coded in Flash, and random red dots that played tones when overshaded with the mouse. At the bottom of this page was a login feature to the site that included a redirect to the hell.com search page if the user either incorrectly inputted a login id, or simply waited too long
- In 2011, the domain is disabled with a blank (white screen) with no detectable links.
- Later in 2011, this web ID redirects one to The Gospel Media Network, a Christian religious site.

=== Subdomain Bat. Hell.com ===
BAT was described as the "creative thinktank" of Hell.com. It claimed to excel in "simple effective solutions", "alternative perspectives" and "extreme ideas". As well, under the title "INVISIBLE", BAT stated that it worked "confidentially as a mercenary resource", apparently for "leading advertising, communications, and technology companies."

=== Final.org ===
On Aronson's Portfolio's "cultural" page, a link to the site has been made under the link to Hell.com, being labeled as "overview."

In May 2006, the layout of Hell.com's index page had similarities to Final.org's. They both take on the same structure of word layouts and both share a white background. Moreover, the logo-file of Hell.com is hosted at final.org, which can be seen if one uses the 'view source' option of one's browser.

== Art Events ==
Hell.com hosted four art events under Aronson:

- "s u r f a c e"
  Opened on January 1, 1999, and closed on January 26, 1999, it was Hell.com's first event and was described as "a self contained immersive experience of selected content from the project's parallel web", a presentation of "the collaborative work by 17 members of the HELL project." During the first 48 hours of its release, 0100101110101101.org downloaded the site's files and created a copy as anticopyright.
- "skinonskinonskin"
  Opened in September 1999, this event is a network installation by Auriea Harvey (Entropy8) and Michael Samyn (Zuper!) The site had a pay-per-view entry, costing eight euros for five days on access and €100 for a lifetime access.
- "chaos"
  Released in November 2000
- "Gateway"
  Opened in 2002, the gateway was an experimental chat project that stopped working in November 2006. The experimental chat was developed by various net artists and programmers; among them the artists behind "8081.com" and "medialounge.org". The chat itself involved a type of console by which the user apparently linked to the Hell.com parallel web. They were able to access a number of flash animations by typing certain words on a grey bar located on the upper left corner of the screen. The animations differed depending on which keyword typed in (for example "seba", "luca" and "anto" which are the names of the artists of "8081.com").

"Globalhalo" hosted part of this project and used similar flash animations as background. It also revealed the story about the small community of regular guest that was once formed in final.org.

== Site alterations ==
The site's standard set of pages occasionally become inaccessible to be replaced with a different (usually one-paged) frontend. For instance:

- Around April 2006, the site underwent a massive change. The front page presented a selection of links which directed to various similar-looking pages filled with adverts and news. It was possible to navigate to the chat zone (see above) directly from the site.
- As of June 2006, the + sign at the bottom of the index page directed to http://final.org, from which can be accessed the chat zone.
- As of August 2006, accessing the front page produced a non-linked random aphorism.
- As of October 2008, accessing hell.com led to a page with flying questions and answers.
- As of January 2010, Hell.com was a blank white page, and read in the middle of the page "No Access" When moving the cursor just above "No Access," the screen turned black except for a white arrow pointing down. If the arrow was clicked, it directed to another screen, also showing a white arrow, with frightening music. Under the white arrow was '|| ||||| ||| |||| |." If this was clicked, it directed to Google.
- As of August 2010, Hell.com seemed to only feature a single, home page containing a very large photograph of Sarah Palin with yellow eyes. In tiny text in the bottom-left corner of the page was the statement: "Everything that you really want exists here. Hell.com is the destination of desire, the home of temptation. Without desire there is no hope and without temptation there is no passion."
- As of 28 October 2010, the main page contained a black circular puzzle image on a red background with animated red mist. If the user navigated to Hell.com/members it directed to the login screen. If the user cancelled or failed the login, a black page with a search field in the center was displayed. If the user keyed anything in (or nothing), they were redirected to a custom Google search page with an image link at the top to lyqyd.com, which displayed the letters LYQYD on a black background with a similar green mist as on the Hell.com page.
- As of December 20, 2010, Hell.com's website shows "domain disabled" in the title and a "blank page".
- As of September 21, 2011, Hell.com's website redirects to http://thegospelmedianetwork.com/
- As of January 9, 2012, Hell.com's website shows "domain disabled" in the title and a "blank page" again i.e., as prior to the redirection mentioned in the previous point. The NS servers for hell.com and heaven.com are identical. Since heaven.com redirects to http://thegospelmedianetwork.com/, it is likely The Gospel Media Network still owns the domain.

== 0100101110101101.org's version ==
Sometime in 1997, the website 0100101110101101.org acquired the webpage code of Hell.com during the first 48 hours of one of its events and created a similar one as "a digital monument to the principles upon which the Internet runs," and an anticopyright. "'The belief that information must be free,'" explained at the time (by) Renato, (a) 0100101110101101.ORG spokesman, 'is a tribute to the way in which a very good computer or a valid program works: binary numbers move in accordance with the most logic, direct and necessary way to do their complex function. What is a computer if not something that benefits by the free flow of information? Copyright is boring.'

About two hours later, after the acquired code was made into a separate site, an e-mail from Hell.com was sent to 0100101110101101.org in response as well as accusing them of stealing work of Hell.com's members:

cute…

please immediately remove this material from your server

you are in violation of international copyright laws which are clearly posted in the copyright information contained in our source code.

also of note,

it appears as though you have violated the copyrights of quite a few of our members individually:::::::::::::::

http://www.0100101110101101.ORG
on behalf of these individuals we request that you also remove

these materials from your server as well

In reaction to the questions "So what was the idea behind taking this site?" and "To access a formerly closed system, that was open only to a self-proclaimed elite, and make it accessible to everybody?" 0100101110101101.org answered that "the feeling that Hell.com was exactly the opposite of what we think that the web could and should be, but this is not really our own idea."

In an interview, Aronson stated that "'Anyone can spin this any way they want, but in the final analysis, it is just simple theft. It's a publicity stunt to create awareness for a bunch of people who have no apparent talents.'"

Despite the fact that "HELL.COM has … threatened legal proceedings for copyright violations", the event is still readily available and 0100101110101101.org has not removed the pages from their site.

== Sale of Hell.com's domain name ==
In April 2000, Aronson attempted to sell Hell.com in an auction with an eight million dollar reserve bid, but decided against it.

In an interview with Domenico Quarenta of the magazine Cluster, Aronson stated that having the most visible address is "negative for us, but has a large value… which could be exchanged for resources to help further the goals of the project." Then, to explain the first sale, he announced that he "held off announcing the sale … During this time the dot com crash happened and what was worth 8(eight) million became saleable at only a couple of million… so i decided to wait until the market recovered."

Then, on October 27, 2006, it was reported in the Wall Street Journal that the Hell.com domain name would be sold that day in a live auction by the domain company Moniker. A one million dollar reserve bid was placed and Kenneth Aronson announced that the proceeds would be used to benefit the hell.com community. However, CNNMoney announced that Hell.com was not bought by any of the bidders even though Aronson said that, "'Branding experts said the name is recognized more than Coca-Cola.'"

Hell.com was sold in November 2009 to domain investor Rick Latona. The following year he put to auction several times, with reserves of up to US$1.5 million.

As of August 2015, Hell.com has been replaced with a "placeholder" website and a drop down bar saying the site is available for rent or purchase.

In 2023, the site triggers a connection to www.mybible.com.
