= EToys =

EToy or EToys may refer to:

- Etoy, Switzerland, a small town
- Etoys (programming language), an educational programming language
- eToys.com, a Dot-com era company/website
- etoy, a conceptual art group
- Electronic toys, typically built for and used by children
- Educational toys, typically built for and used by children
