= Ana Peraica =

Croatian new media scholar

- Born: June 15, 1972 (age 54); Croatia
- Movement: New media

Academic background
- Education: Jan Van Eyck Akademie, University of Amsterdam, University of Rijeka

Ana Peraica (born June 15, 1972) is a Croatian-born photography theorist and Ghetto activist, whose work is focused on post-digital photography. Born to a family of professional photographers, her grandfather Antonio Peraica was a war reporter and filmmaker and her father a photographer of architecture. Peraica is focused on constant changes of the medium, bringing focus to its rational, scientific implementations, but also irrational horrors.

Educated as an art historian and philosopher, Peraica graduated from post-academic programs of the theory of arts at the Jan Van Eyck Akademie in Maastricht, continuing at the University of Amsterdam. Her PhD thesis was defended at the University of Rijeka, titled "Photography as Evidence", and was on the epistemology of photography. Peraica was teaching visual culture-related courses at the Rochester Institute of Technology (RIT), Central European University (CEU) and is teaching at Danube University in Krems programs in Media Art Histories and Media Art Cultures.

Peraica's Culture of the Selfie, published by the Institute of Network Cultures (2017) and translated to Croatian for Jesenski I Turk (2022), was one of the first readings on the theme of selfies in the field, which made her work reviewed in succeeding overviews.

== Theories ==
Peraica's main interest is in post-digital photography; made by humans or machines, and its influence on our understanding of the world. Claiming that our understanding of the world is conditioned by photographic technology and photo archives that serve as the evidence in the majority of scientific and humanist disciplines, which prevents us from having any natural depiction of the world, she proceeds in developing system theory based on photographic image. Obviously influenced by Vilem Flusser’s understanding of photography as technology not the image and ideas of image-universe by Jean Baudrillard and Francois Laruelle, Peraica proceeds in defining systems theory based on photographic technology.

In her first book, Culture of the Selfie (Institute of Network Cultures, 2017) she elaborates on the shift in world depiction with the development of the selfie camera. She uses historical analysis of media and the technology of mirroring to develop a theory of perspective that aims to define how the invisible part of the world, set behind the back of the author came visible. In addition to opening the analysis of the relation between visual culture and perception of the world in the back, Peraica in a number of interviews warns on the dangers of such augmented reality in a number of accidental suicides by stepping backward into the abyss when recording selfies.

The problem of the clash between augmented and natural perception is elaborated in her book The Age of Total Images (2019), in which Peraica approaches another perceptual error produced by post-digital camera technologies; a visual flattening of the Earth by merging of photographs and maps in complex images. In a subsequent chapter ‘Reality effect of [abstract] maps in post-digital era’, (The Iconology of abstraction, ed. Purgar, Routledge, 2020) she analyses the role of photography as a mere layer of satellite images, serving to add illusion to a system that is completely out of visual competences of humans.

== Activism ==
In addition to her theoretical and practical work in photography, Peraica is also known as a media activist, contributing to media platforms as Nettime which connect her work to Geert Lovink whose Institute of Network Culture published three of her books. Her activism is focused on over-tourism in Diocletian's Palace in Split, also known as the Ghetto, where she resides and her family studio is situated, opening the Facebook platform Get Getanima. on which numerous inhabitants post photographs and videos of problems they encounter with over-tourism and that has an echo in international media In public, her letters to the directors of UNESCO had the largest reverberance.

== Selected publications ==
- Peraica, Ana (2017), "Culture of the Selfie", Institute for Networked Cultures, Amsterdam, ISBN 9789492302175
- Peraica, Ana (2021), "Selfies as augmentation of (disappearing) reality'", in Donatella Della Ratta; Geert Lovink; Teresa Numerico; Peter Sarram (eds.), The Aesthetics and Politics of The Online self, Palgrave MacMillan, ISBN 978-3030654962
- Peraica, Ana (2023), "Selfies as "Control Pictures": Mastering Fearful Psychosomatic Images Through the Photo Camera", in Shobeiri, Westeest (ed.), Psychosomatic Imagery: Photographic Reflections on Mental Disorders, Palgrave Macmillan, ISBN 978-3-031-22715-8
- Peraica, Ana (2022), "Autografija", in Herzogenrath, Bernd (ed.), Concepts: A Travelogue, Bloomsbury Academic, ISBN 9781501375330
- Peraica, Ana (2022), "Anthropocentrism and solipsism in photographic self-portraits of Edvard Munch", Photographies 12(2), vol. 15, no. 2, pp. 187–203, doi:10.1080/17540763.2022.2060287, S2CID 250118201
- Peraica, Ana (2020), Lovink and Treske (ed.), "From Sociocentric to Egocentric Place'", Videovortex #14, Institute of Network Cultures
- Peraica, Ana (2019), The Age of Total Images, Institute of Network Cultures, Amsterdam
- Peraica, Ana (2020), "Reality effect of [abstract] maps in post-digital era", in Purgar, Kresimir (ed.), The Iconology of abstraction – Non-Figurative Images and the Modern World, Routledge, ISBN 9780429262500
- Peraica, Ana (2021), "Photographocene: The past, present and future in the photography of the environment", Philosophy of Photography, 11, intellect: 99–111, doi:10.1386/pop_00030_1, S2CID 239734825
- Peraica, Ana (2021), "The Work of Art in the Age of Neural Reproduction", Art Documentation Journal, vol. 40, no. 2, University of Chicago, pp. 209–220, doi:10.1086/717074, S2CID 244715939
- Peraica, Ana (2021), Benterbusch, Nora (ed.), "Painting and Postdigital photography", Spotlight on Media Borders, Nomos Verlag (Comparative Media and Cultural Studies)
- Peraica, Ana (2023), "Large datasets and particularity of Art", in Kad, Kwok (ed.), Site as Site in the Digital Age, Springer, ISBN 9789811992087
- Peraica, Ana (2021), "Stolen Faces: Remarks on Agency and Personal Identity", Computation Photography, Artificial Faces, Lexia
- Peraica, Ana (2021), "Face-mockers, Face-shifters, and Face swappers: Agency and personal identity in portrait photography today", Transdisciplinary Imaging Conference, Dark Eden, doi:10.6084/m9.figshare.16993384.v2
- Peraica, Ana (2022), "Genotype, Phenotype, Phototype: Digital Photography, biological variety, and excessive overpopulation of types", in Bergmann, Luke (ed.), Routledge Digital Environmental Humanities Handbook, Routledge, ISBN 9781003082798
- Peraica, Ana (2022), "Phototaxdermy: Deduction of Species by Neural Networks", 35th CIHA Congress: Motion: Migrations, Sao Paulo
- Peraica, Ana (2022), Urabayen, Casero (ed.), "Phototopia - (re)geneating life from photographs. Generative Adversarial Networks and "people that do (no longer) exist", No Future Now: Reutopia and Dystopia in a post-apocalyptic politics, Palgrave Macmillan
