= Daniel García Andújar =

Spanish artist, activist and theorist (born 1966)

Daniel G. Andujar
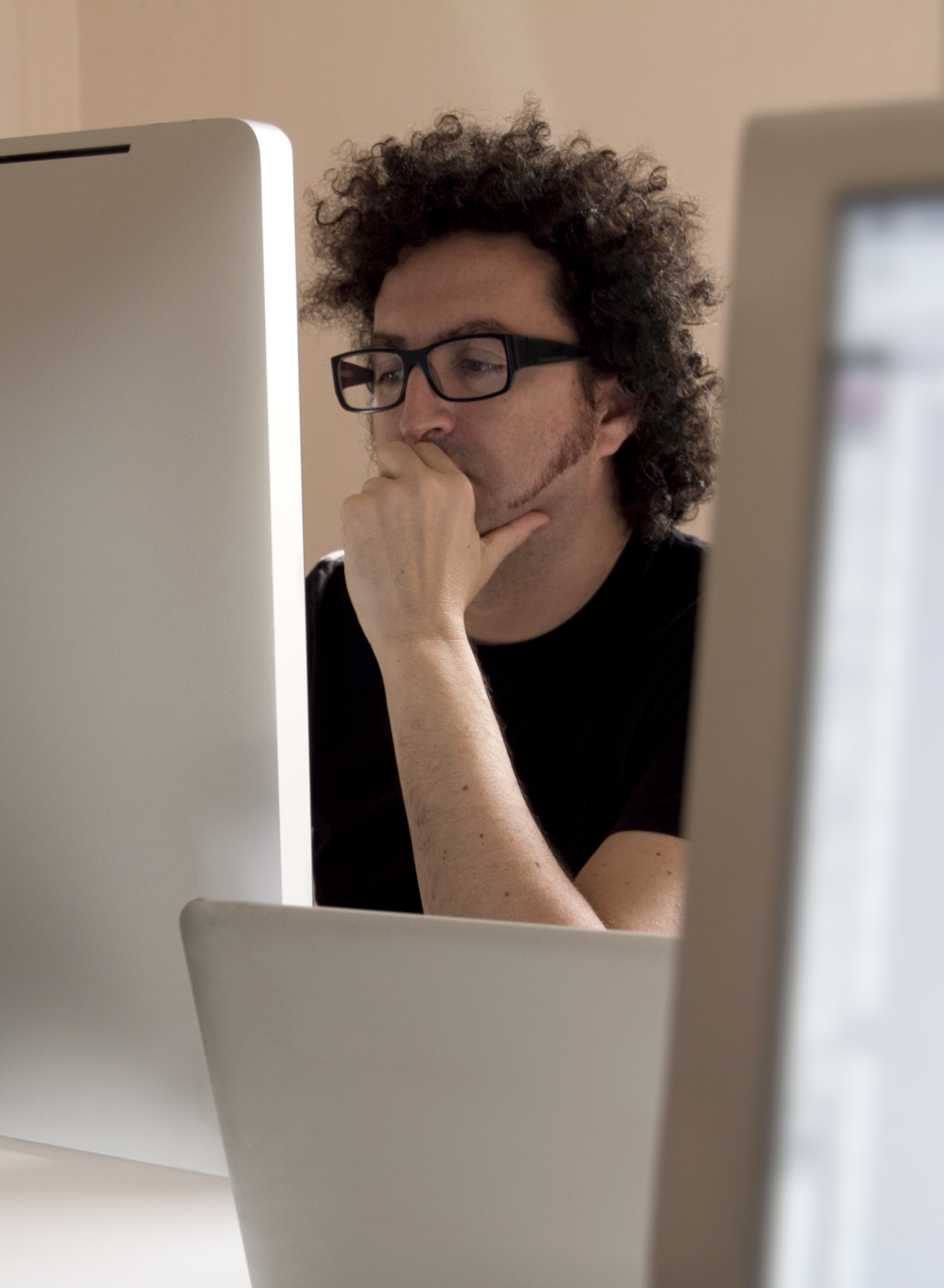
- Daniel García Andújar at Technologies To The People Studio Barcelona in 2011
- Born: 1966 (age 59–60); Almoradi, Alicante
- Occupations: Artist, activist, theorist
- Years active: 1980s-present
- Style: Conceptual art, net.art, tactical media
- Website: http://danielandujar.org

Daniel García Andújar (1966 in Almoradí) is a self-taught, outsider visual media artist, activist, and art theorist from Spain. He lives and works in Barcelona. His work has been exhibited widely, including Manifesta 4, the Venice Biennale and documenta 14 Athens, Kassel. He has directed numerous workshops for artists and social collectives worldwide.

== Work and contributions ==
Andújar is one of the principal exponents of Net.art, founder of Technologies To The People and a member of irational.org. The most prominent projects in this sphere would be the Street Access Machine (1996), a machine allowing those begging in the street to access digital money; The Body Research Machine (1997), an interactive machine that scanned the body's DNA strands, processing them for scientific experiments, and x-devian by knoppix, an open-source operating system presented as part of the Individual Citizen Republic Project: The System (2003) project. Another course the work takes would be the critical reflection on the art world TTTP presents through the Technologies to the People Foundation with its collections distributed free of charge—Photo Collection (1997), Video Collection (1998) and Net Art Classics Collection (1999)—already calling the idea of material and intellectual property into question during this period. Andújar is the director of numerous internet projects, such as e-sevilla, e-valencia, e-madrid and e-barcelona.

From January to April 2015, the Museo Nacional Centro de Arte Reina Sofía (MNCARS) hosted a comprehensive solo exhibition of his Works curated by Manuel Borja-Villel under the title Operating System. His Work is in major public and private collections, including the Museo Nacional Centro de Arte Reina Sofia's National Collection.

== Projects ==
- 1996–2011: Technologies To The People, began in 1996 is an historical net.art project.
- 2003: X-devian. The New Technologies to the People System.
- 2004: Postcapital Archive (1989–2001).
- 2011: A vuelo de pájaro Let's Democratize Democracy.

== Exhibitions ==
- 2006 – Postcapital, Palau de la Virreina, Barcelona, Spain.
- 2008 – Anna Kournikova Deleted By Memeright Trusted System – Art in the Age of Intellectual Property. Postcapital Archive. Hartware MedienKunstVerein, PHOENIX Halle Dortmund, Germany. Curated by: Inke Arns and Francis Hunger
- 2008 – Unrecorded, Akbank Sanat, Istanbul, Turkey. Curated by Basak Senova.
- 2008 – Herramientas del arte. Relecturas (Tools of Art: Re-readings), Parpalló, Valencia. With Rogelio López Cuenca and Isidoro Valcárcel Medina, Curated by: Álvaro de los Ángeles. Spain.
- 2008 -Banquete_nodos y redes. LABoral Centro de Arte y Creación Industrial, Gijón, Curated by: Karin Ohlenschläger. Spain.
- 2008 -The Wonderful World of irational.org: Tools, Techniques and Events 1996–2006. Museum of Contemporary Art Vojvodina, Novi Sad. Curators: Inke Arns (Dortmund) and Jacob Lillemose (Kopenhagen). Serbia.
- 2009 – Postcapital. Archive 1989–2001, Württembergischer Kunstverein, Stuttgart. Curated by Iris Dressler and Hans D. Christ.
- 2009 – Postcapital (Mauer), Museum for Modern Art, Bremen, Germany. Curated by Dr. Anne Thurmann-Jajes.
- 2009 – Subversive Praktiken, Württembergischer Kunstverein, Stuttgart.
- 2009 – Postcapital Archive. The Unavowable Community. Catalan Pavilion, 53. Biennale, Venice. Curated by Valentin Roma.
- 2009 – Postcapital Archive (1989–2001), Iberia Art Center, Beijing. Curated by Valentin Roma.
- 2010 – Postkapital Arşiv 1989–2001 Sedat Yazici Riva Foundation for Education, Culture and Art, Istanbul Curated by Basak Senova.
- 2010 – BARCELONA – VALÈNCIA – PALMA. A History of Confluence and Divergence. Objects of desire. Centre de Cultura Contemporània de Barcelona, Spain. Curated by Ignasi Aballí, Melcior Comes and Vicent Sanchis.
- 2010 – Postcapital Archive (1989–2001) . Total Museum of Contemporary Art, Seoul, South Korea. Curated by Nathalie Boseul Shin and Hans D. Christ.
- 2010 – Postcapital Archive (1989–2001) La comunidad inconfesable, Bòlit, Centre d’Art Contemporani, Girona, Spain. Curated by Valentín Roma.
- 2010 – The Wall. Postcapital Archive (1989–2001), Espai Visor, Valencia.
- 2015 – Sistema Operativo. Museo Nacional Centro de Arte Reina Sofía. Curated by Manuel Borja-Villel.
- 2015 – Naturaleza vigilada / Überwachte Natur, Museo Vostell Malpartida.

== Museum Collections ==
- Museo Nacional Centro de Arte Reina Sofía, Madrid
- Institut Valencià d'Art Modern (IVAM), Valencia
- Museu d'Art Contemporani de Barcelona (MACBA), Barcelona
- ARTIUM – Basque Museum Center of Contemporary Art, Vitoria-Gasteiz
- Museo de Arte Contemporáneo de Castilla y León (MUSAC), Léon
- CA2M – Centro de Arte Dos de Mayo, Madrid
- Centro de Artes Visuales Helga de Alvear, Cáceres
- Es Baluard Museu d’Art Modern, Palma de Mallorca
- Museu d´Art Jaume Morera, Lleida
- Banco De España, Madrid
- Walker Art CenterMinneapolis, MN
- The Newark MuseumNewark, NJ
- les Abattoirs – FRAC Midi-PyrénéesToulouse

== Selected books ==
- Hans D. Christ, Iris Dressler (ed.): Technologies To The People. "Postcapital Archive (1989–2001)" Daniel Garcia Andujar, Hatje Cantz Verlag, edited 2011. ISBN 978-3-7757-3170-6.
- Daniel G. Andújar, Operating System, Authors: Jacob Lillemose, Iris Dressler, Javier de la Cueva, José Luis Pardo, Alberto López Cuenca, Isidoro Valcárcel Medina. Museo Nacional Centro de Arte Reina Sofía, Madrid, 2015, ISBN 978-84-8026-506-5 NIPO: 036-15-006-1
- Daniel G. Andújar: Naturaleza vigilada. Überwachte Natur. Museo Vostell Malpartida, Cáceres, 2015, Deposito legal Cc-285-2015.
