= Marisa Olson =

American artist

- Born: 1977 (age 48–49); Augsburg, West Germany
- Known for: Artist, Curator, Critic
- Notable work: "Marisa's American Idol Audition Blog", "Performed Listening" Series, "Time Capsules"

Marisa Olson is an artist, writer, curator, and former punk singer. In 2004 she auditioned for popular American television show American Idol as an artistic project. Olson coined the term "postinternet art" in 2006 to describe her work.

Her work combines performance, video, painting/drawing, and installation to address the cultural history of technology, experiences of gender, and the relationship between pop culture and politics.

Olson was a founding member of the Nasty Nets' "Internet Surfing club", a web-based net art group documenting and remixing their experiences online. Olson is a writer and lecturer in the field of media theory and politics.

She has been a visiting artist at Yale, SAIC, VCU, Oberlin, Brown, and elsewhere, and she has also worked on the faculty team at SUNY Purchase, Rhode Island School of Design and New York University. She has been a Master Artist in Residence at the Atlantic Center for the Arts, an Eyebeam Resident, and an Artist in Residence at the Corwin Physics Labs at the University of Oregon.

== Career ==
=== Artist, curator, and critic ===
Marisa Olson currently works in New York and has had work exhibited in various galleries including the Tate, the New Museum, the Nam June Paik Art Center, and others. She has organized exhibitions and programs at the Guggenheim, SFMOMA, the Getty, White Columns, Artists Space, and elsewhere. In the past, she has been former editor for Rhizome and Camerawork. She has written for Artforum, Wired, Afterimage, Flash Art, ArtReview, and others among various books.

=== Post-Internet ===
The term "postinternet art", often referred to as an era discussed by many contemporary artists examining the dawn of new technology, is attributed to be coined by Marisa Olson in 2006. This era of art or creative production was defined by Olson as the creation of art following time spent utilizing and exploring the World Wide Web. The Post-Internet for Marisa Olson refers to any works created after the use of the internet, and what is made is the product of this excessive computer use or indulgence of the internet. A key separation made by Marisa Olson in her definition, practice, and expansion of post internet art is that she “delineates Internet art from Post Internet art. Internet Art is on the Internet; Post Internet art is after the internet.”

=== American Idol ===
A significant work of Marisa Olson is known for which is often associated with her practice was navigated by "her investigation into pop culture" that eventually led her to popular American television show American Idol.

The work titled “The One That Got Away,” began by Olson auditioning for American Idol in 2004. The artist then blogged about her experience online, documenting her process leading up to the audition. Post-audition, Marisa Olson created a “consciously artless” video combining footage that fictitiously acts out the audition. Marisa Olson's American Idol audition segment was never shown on national television.

== Selected works ==
=== The One That Got Away, 2004 ===
Marisa Olson trained herself for three months in preparation for an American Idol audition which would be used as an artwork. The piece is a video which includes the artist speaking about the process and preparation as well as scenes from the real audition. The work had been removed from YouTube due to copyright issues, yet is available on Vimeo.

=== Space Junk, 2010 ===
From afar, Space Junk appears to be a “black, monochrome square painting like Kazimir Malevich.” When one approaches the work closer, it is revealed that it is not just black, but a “pattern of flickering stars” which has been appropriated from imagery taken from the internet in the form of a GIF file.

=== Golden Oldies, 2014 ===
Recorded on video, Olson is seen with “ephemera from music’s past,” and the objects are all painted gold. In the work, Olson handles the equipment in odd manners, continually breaking items such as vinyl records and cassette tapes.

== See also ==
- Postinternet
- New media art
- Tactical media
- Video Art
- Performance Art
