= Vuk Ćosić =

Slovenian artist (born 1966)

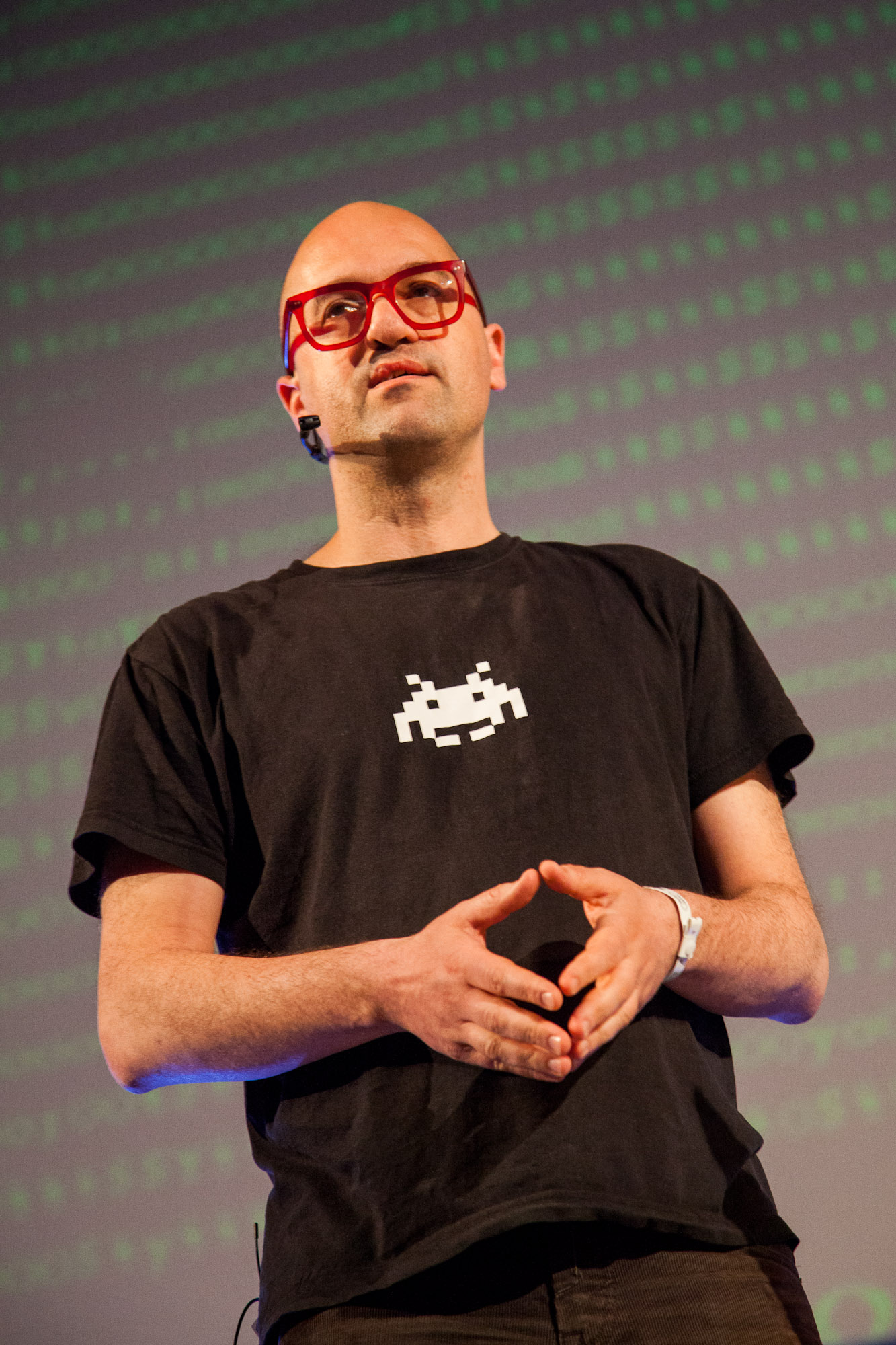
- Vuk Ćosić in 2012
- Born: 31 July 1966 (age 60); Belgrade, SR Serbia, SFR Yugoslavia
- Education: University of Belgrade
- Website: Vuk Cosic

Vuk Ćosić (Serbian Cyrillic: Вук Ћосић; born 31 July 1966) is a Slovenian contemporary artist associated with the net.art movement. Active online since the mid-1990s, he took part in the early European net.art scene around Nettime and organized an informal net.art meeting in Trieste in 1996.

Ćosić is known particularly for Internet-based works using ASCII and for projects concerned with copying and circulation online. His works include History of Art for Airports (1997), Documenta Done (1997), and ASCII History of Moving Images (1998).

== Net.art ==
Ćosić became involved with the network of artists, theorists and activists around Nettime in the mid-1990s. In 1996, Pit Schultz used the term "net.art" while preparing a Berlin project that included Ćosić; later that year, Ćosić organized an informal net.art meeting in Trieste that helped circulate the term. A frequently repeated account that Ćosić coined "net.art" after receiving a garbled email originated in a 1997 message by Alexei Shulgin. Later accounts have identified Shulgin's story as a prank and attributed the term instead to Schultz.

== ASCII and related works ==
Beginning in 1996, Ćosić developed software for converting still and moving images and sound into ASCII characters. His ASCII History of Moving Images (1998) applied the technique to clips from film and television, including the Lumière brothers, Battleship Potemkin, King Kong, Star Trek, Blowup, Psycho, and Deep Throat. The clips were rendered as green characters on a black background, recalling the display conventions of early computers.

In History of Art for Airports (1997), Ćosić recast works and figures from art history and popular culture as pictograms resembling airport signage. The series included references to Paul Cézanne, Marcel Duchamp, Andy Warhol, Star Trek and King Kong, as well as net artists including Jodi, Heath Bunting and Alexei Shulgin.

Other works from his ASCII series include Deep ASCII, ASCII Unreal, ASCII Camera, ASCII Architecture, and History of Art for the Blind. In the latter, images converted into ASCII are presented through recordings that read the individual characters aloud.

== Documenta Done ==
In 1997, after the organizers of documenta X planned to take the exhibition's website offline following the event and distribute it on CD-ROM, Ćosić copied the site and republished it on the server of the Ljubljana Digital Media Lab as Documenta Done. He also circulated a mock press release attributing the copying of the site to an "Eastern European hacker". The project has subsequently been discussed in accounts of early net.art in relation to copying, access and institutional control over digital works.

== Selected exhibitions and projects ==
=== 1991 ===
- Basta, Dubrovnik (with Jurij Krpan, Vlado Martek, Ana Opalić, Talent and Slaven Tolj).

=== 1992 ===
- Ljubljana, Flat Jurij Krpan
- Trieste, Galeria Juliet
- Total Egal, St. Lambrecht (with Antun Maračić and Nenad Dančuo).

=== 1994 ===
- Hollywood, Ljubljana Castle, Ljubljana.

=== 1995 ===
- Le Coco Fruitwear (Urbanaria – Part Two, with Matej Andraž Vogrinčič), presented in Ljubljana, Rijeka, Dubrovnik, Split, London and Turin.

=== 1996 ===
- Velodrome Online (with Luka Frelih and Strip Core/The Drug of the Natyon), Electronic Cafe International, Copenhagen.

=== 1997 ===
- Raziskovalni Inštitut za Geo-umetniško statistiko Republike Slovenije: Public presentation of the mobile etalon of the Slovene Mediterranean metre (with Alenka Pirman and Irena Wölle), Piran and Turin.
- A Day in the Life of a Net.artist, presented as part of Media in Media at Mestna galerija, Ljubljana.

=== 1998 ===
- History of Art for Airports, Tank, No. 1, London.
- ASCII History of Moving Images, a series of seven short moving-image excerpts converted into ASCII.

=== 2010 ===
- Book Burning Exhibit, a solo exhibition at the Trubar Literature House in Ljubljana, accompanied by a lecture by Ćosić.

== Videography ==
- Deep ASCII (1998), an ASCII conversion of Deep Throat; directed by Ćosić, with programming by Luka Frelih.

== Music videos ==
- ASCII Music Videos (1998), six music videos using moving ASCII, with music by Alexei Shulgin and programming by Luka Frelih; the project was published online and on a VinylVideo record.
  - C'Mon Babe Light My Fire – 3:15
  - Purple Haze – 2:46
  - California Dreamin – 2:50
  - Venus – 3:16
  - My Generation – 3:08
  - Should I Stay or Should I Go – 3:50
