= Internet art =

Form of art distributed on the Internet

"Simple Net Art Diagram", a 1997 work by Michael Sarff and Tim Whidden

Internet art (also known as net art or web art) is a form of new media art distributed via the Internet. This form of art circumvents the traditional dominance of the physical gallery and museum system. In many cases, the viewer is drawn into some kind of interaction with the work of art. Artists working in this manner are sometimes referred to as net artists.

Net artists may use specific social or cultural internet traditions to produce their art outside of the technical structure of the internet. Internet art is often – but not always – interactive, participatory, and multimedia-based. Internet art can be used to spread a message, either political or social, using human interactions. Typically, artists find ways to produce art through the use of the internet and the tools that it provides us with.

The term Internet art typically does not refer to art that has been simply digitized and uploaded to be viewable over the Internet, such as in an online gallery. Rather, this genre relies intrinsically on the Internet to exist as a whole, taking advantage of such aspects as an interactive interface and connectivity to multiple social and economic cultures and micro-cultures, not only web-based works.

New media theorist and curator Jon Ippolito defined "Ten Myths of Internet Art" in 2002. He cites the above stipulations, as well as defining it as distinct from commercial web design, and touching on issues of permanence, archivability, and collecting in a fluid medium.

== History and context ==
Internet art is rooted in disparate artistic traditions and movements, ranging from Dada to Situationism, conceptual art, Fluxus, video art, kinetic art, performance art, telematic art and happenings. The common theme within these movements being the focus on the experimentalism, performance, and interactivity of art.

In 1974, Canadian artist Vera Frenkel worked with the Bell Canada Teleconferencing Studios to produce the work String Games: Improvisations for Inter-City Video, the first artwork in Canada to use telecommunications technologies.

An early telematic artwork was Roy Ascott's work, La Plissure du Texte, performed in collaboration created for an exhibition at the Musée d'Art Moderne de la Ville de Paris in 1983.

In 1985, Eduardo Kac created the animated videotex poem Reabracadabra for the Minitel system.

Media art institutions such as Ars Electronica Festival in Linz, or the Paris-based IRCAM (a research center for electronic music), would also support or present early networked art. In 1996, Helen Thorington founded Turbulence.org, an online platform for commissioning and exhibiting net art, and hosting multi location networked performances. In 1991 Wolfgang Staehle founded important experimental platforms such as The Thing. In 1994 entrepreneur John Borthwick and curator Benjamin Weil produced artworks online by Doug Aitken, Jenny Holzer and others on Adaweb and in 1997 MIT's List Visual Arts Center hosted "PORT: Navigating Digital Culture", which included internet art in a gallery space and "time-based Internet projects." Artists in the show included Cary Peppermint, Prema Murthy, Ricardo Dominguez, Helen Thorington, and Adrianne Wortzel.

Also in 1997 internet art was exhibited at documenta X (directed by Catherine David), with curator Simon Lamunière. The 10 projects presented simultaneously in Kassel and online were those of Matt Mullican, Antoni Muntadas, Holger Friese, Heath Bunting, Felix Stefan Huber & Philip Pocock, Herve Graumann, Jodi, Martin Kippenberger and Carsten Höller among others.

In 2000 the Whitney Museum of American Art included net art in their Biennial exhibit. It was the first time that internet art had been included as a special category in the Biennial, and it marked one of the earliest examples of the inclusion of internet art in a museum setting. Internet artists included Mark Amerika, Fakeshop, Ken Goldberg, etoy and ®™ark.

In 2001, the 49th Venice Biennale featured its first-ever work of internet art: Biennale.py, a computer virus created specifically for the event by the artist duo Eva & Franco Mattes. Written in the Python programming language, the virus was released on opening night and quickly spread worldwide. The exhibition included two interconnected computers that perpetually infected and disinfected each other in an endless loop.

With the rise of search engines as a gateway to accessing the web in the late 1990s, many net artists turned their attention to related themes. The 2001 'Data Dynamics' exhibit at the Whitney Museum featured 'Netomat' (Maciej Wisniewski) and 'Apartment' – a Turbulence.org commission – (Marek Walczak and Martin Wattenberg), which used search queries as raw material. Mary Flanagan's ' The Perpetual Bed' received attention for its use of 3D nonlinear narrative space, or what she called "navigable narratives." Her 2001 piece titled 'Collection' shown in the Whitney Biennial displayed items amassed from hard drives around the world in a computational collective unconscious.' Golan Levin's 'The Secret Lives of Numbers' (2000) – also a Turbulence.org commission – visualized the "popularity" of the numbers 1 to 1,000,000 as measured by Alta Vista search results. Such works pointed to alternative interfaces and questioned the dominant role of search engines in controlling access to the net.

Nevertheless, the Internet is not reducible to the web, nor to search engines. Besides these unicast (point to point) applications, suggesting the existence of reference points, there is also a multicast (multipoint and uncentered) internet that has been explored by very few artistic experiences, such as the Poietic Generator. Internet art has, according to Juliff and Cox, suffered under the privileging of the user interface inherent within computer art. They argue that Internet is not synonymous with a specific user and specific interface, but rather a dynamic structure that encompasses coding and the artist's intention.

At the same period, original attempts to establish a physical relation between what happened on the web and what would be exhibited in museums were developed by MUDAM Musée d’Art Contemporain du Luxembourg and most of all by MIXM. At the time, and before platforms like Second Life where Cao Fei developed her RMB City, contemporary artists like Peter Kogler, Heimo Zobernig, Nedko Solakov or Robin Rimbaud aka Scanner realized works online that could be seen in art museums specifically as installations and not just on a computer screen showing internet art. In Solakov's work for example, one could interact online with objects that were in the exhibition space of the Centre d'Art Contemporain Genève. In Heimo Zobernig's work, one could physically move a wall to reveal a space in the MAMCO containing a 3D online rendering of the same space.

The emergence of social networking platforms in the mid-2000s facilitated a transformative shift in the distribution of internet art. Early online communities were organized around specific "topical hierarchies", whereas social networking platforms consist of egocentric networks, with the "individual at the center of their own community". Artistic communities on the Internet underwent a similar transition in the mid-2000s, shifting from Surf Clubs, "15 to 30 person groups whose members contributed to an ongoing visual-conceptual conversation through the use of digital media" and whose membership was restricted to a select group of individuals, to image-based social networking platforms, like Flickr, which permit access to any individual with an e-mail address. Internet artists make extensive use of the networked capabilities of social networking platforms, and are rhizomatic in their organization, in that "production of meaning is externally contingent on a network of other artists' content".

=== Post-Internet ===
Post-Internet is a loose descriptor for works of art that are derived from the Internet as well as the internet's effects on aesthetics, culture and society. It is a broad term with many associations and has been heavily criticized.

The term emerged during the mid-2000s and was coined by Internet artist Marisa Olson in 2008. Discussions about Internet art by Marisa Olson, Gene McHugh, and Artie Vierkant (the latter notable for his Image Objects, a series of deep blue monochrome prints) brought the term to a mainstream consciousness. Between the 2000s and 2010s, post-Internet artists were largely the domain of millennials operating on web platforms such as Tumblr and MySpace or working in social media video and post-narrative formats such as YouTube, Vevo, or memes.

According to a 2015 article in The New Yorker, the term describes "the practices of artists who ... unlike those of previous generations, [employ] the Web [as] just another medium, like painting or sculpture. Their artworks move fluidly between spaces, appearing sometimes on a screen, other times in a gallery." In the early 2010s, post-Internet was popularly associated with the musician Grimes, visual artists like Cory Arcangel, Artie Vierkant, Petra Cortrght, Ryan Trecartin and Lizzie Fitch, and Kalup Linzy, and social practice dissensus collectives like DIS and K-HOLE. The movement catapulted a number of hybrid microgenres and subcultures such as bloghouse, bro dubstep, seapunk, electroclash, and vaporwave.

== Tools ==
Art historian Rachel Greene identified six forms of internet art that existed from 1993 to 1996: email, audio, video, graphics, animation and websites. These mailing lists allowed for organization which was carried over to face-to-face meetings that facilitated more nuanced conversations, less burdened from miscommunication.

Since the mid-2000s, many artists have used Google's search engine and other services for inspiration and materials. New Google services breed new artistic possibilities. Beginning in 2008, Jon Rafman collected images from Google Street View for his project called The Nine Eyes of Google Street View. Another ongoing net art project is I'm Google by Dina Kelberman which organizes pictures and videos from Google and YouTube around a theme in a grid form that expands as you scroll.

Another method of creating web art that has been employed commonly is altering the internal code of files. Through this method, web artists destroy a section or sections of code within the metadata of files, creating a version of the file that fails to be displayed correctly.

== See also ==
- Art sales – Sale of art works
- Artmedia – Scientific project concerning media
- ASCII art – Computer art form using text characters
- Cyberculture – Culture that has emerged from the use of computer networks
- Cyberformance – Theatrical performance
- Demoscene – Computer art subculture
- Digital art – Art created digitally with a computer
- Electronic literature – Literary works created for digital devices
- Email art – Type of digital art
- Fax art
- Fractal art – Form of algorithmic art
- Hypertext fiction – Genre of electronic literature
- Internet aesthetics – Visual styles and subcultures associated with the internet
- Internet music – Music influenced by Internet culture
- Net.art – Group of artists that use the Internet as their medium
- Net-poetry – Experimental art
- Online exhibition
- Post-Internet – 21st century art movement
- SITO – Online artist collective
- Surfing club
- Software art – Creative works relying on the executive functions of computers to provoke emotions
- Telematic art – Art using telecommunications networks
- Virtual art – Art involving virtual environments and interactive technologies

== Bibliography ==
- Kate Armstrong, Jeremy Bailey & Faisal Anwar on Net Art in Canadian Art Magazine
- Weibel, Peter and Gerbel, Karl (1995). Welcome in the Net World, @rs electronica 95 Linz. Wien New York: Springer Verlag. ISBN 3-211-82709-9
- Fred Forest 1998,¨Pour un art actuel, l'art à l'heure d'Internet" l'Harmattan, Paris
- Baranski Sandrine, La musique en réseau, une musique de la complexité ? Éditions universitaires européennes, mai 2010
- Barreto, Ricardo; Perissinotto, Paula. "the_culture_of_immanence". Archived from the original on 29 September 2011.
- Baumgärtel, Tilman (2001). net.art 2.0 – Neue Materialien zur Netzkunst / New Materials towards Net art. Nürnberg: Verlag für moderne Kunst. ISBN 3-933096-66-9.
- Wilson, Stephen (2001). Information Arts: Intersections of Art, Science and Technology. Cambridge, Massachusetts : MIT Press. ISBN 0-262-23209-X.
- Caterina Davinio 2002. Tecno-Poesia e realtà virtuali / Techno-Poetry and Virtual Realities, Sometti, Mantua (IT) Collection: Archivio della poesia del 900. Mantua Municipality. With English translation. ISBN 88-88091-85-8
- Stallabrass, Julian (2003). "Internet Art: the online clash of culture and commerce". Tate Publishing. ISBN 1-85437-345-5, ISBN 978-1-85437-345-8.
- Christine Buci-Glucksmann, "L’art à l’époque virtuel", in Frontières esthétiques de l’art, Arts 8, Paris: L’Harmattan, 2004
- Greene, Rachel (2004). "Internet Art". Thames and Hudson. ISBN 0-500-20376-8, ISBN 978-0-500-20376-7.
- Corby, Tom (2006). "Network Art: Practices and Positions". Routledge, ISBN 0-415-36479-5.
- WB05 e-symposium published as ISEA Newsletter #102 – ISSN 1488-3635 #102
- Juliff, Toby & Cox, Travis. 'The Post-display condition of contemporary computer art.' eMaj #8 (April 2015) https://emajartjournal.files.wordpress.com/2012/11/cox-and-juliff_the-post-display-condition-of-contemporary-computer-art.pdf
- Ascott, R.2003. Telematic Embrace: visionary theories of art, technology and consciousness. (Edward A. Shanken, ed.) Berkeley: University of California Press.
- Roy Ascott 2002. Technoetic Arts (Editor and Korean translation: YI, Won-Kon), (Media & Art Series no. 6, Institute of Media Art, Yonsei University). Yonsei: Yonsei University Press
- Ascott, R. 1998. Art & Telematics: toward the Construction of New Aesthetics. (Japanese trans. E. Fujihara). A. Takada & Y. Yamashita eds. Tokyo: NTT Publishing Co., Ltd.
- Fred Forest 2008. Art et Internet, Paris Editions Cercle D'Art / Imaginaire Mode d'Emploi
- Thomas Dreher: IASLonline Lessons/Lektionen in NetArt.
- Thomas Dreher: History of Computer Art, chap.VI: Net Art: Networks, Participation, Hypertext
- Monoskop (2010). Overview of 'surf clubs' phenomenon.
- Art in the Era of the Internet, PBS Report
- (in Spanish) Martín Prada, Juan, Prácticas artísticas e Internet en la época de las redes sociales, Editorial AKAL, Madrid, 2012, ISBN 978-84-460-3517-6
- Bosma, Josephine (2011) "Nettitudes – Let's Talk Net Art" NAI Publishers, ISBN 978-90-5662-800-0
- Schneider, B. (2011, January 6). From Clubs to Affinity: The Decentralization of Art on the Internet « 491. 491. Retrieved March 3, 2011, from https://web.archive.org/web/20120707101824/http://fourninetyone.com/2011/01/06/fromclubstoaffinity/
- Boyd, D. M.; Ellison, N. B. (2007). "Social Network Sites: Definition, History, and Scholarship". Journal of Computer-Mediated Communication. 13 (1): 210–230. doi:10.1111/j.1083-6101.2007.00393.x. S2CID 52810295.
- Moss, Ceci. (2008). Thoughts on “New Media Artists v. Artists with Computers". Rhizome Journal. http://rhizome.org/editorial/2008/dec/3/thoughts-on-quotnew-media-artists-vs-artists-with-/
- Greene, Rachel. (2000) A History of Internet Art. Artforum, vol. 38.
- Bookchin, Natalie & Alexei Shulgin (1994–5). Introduction to net.art. Rhizome. http://rhizome.org/artbase/artwork/48530/.
- Atkins, Robert. (1995). The Art World (and I) Go Online. Art in America 83/2.
- Houghton, B. (2002). The Internet & art: A guidebook for artists. Upper Saddle River, NJ: Prentice Hall. ISBN 0-13-089374-9.
- Bosma, J. (2011). Nettitudes: Let's talk net art. Rotterdam: Nai Publishers. ISBN 978-90-5662-800-0.
- Daniels, D., & Reisinger, G. (2009). Net pioneers 1.0: Contextualizing early net-based art. Berlin: Sternberg Press. ISBN 978-1-933128-71-9.
