= Nettime =

Mailing list about internet culture

nettime
- Editors: Ted Byfield, Felix Stalder
- Website: nettime.org
- Commercial: No

Nettime is an internet mailing list proposed in 1995 by Geert Lovink and Pit Schultz (then half-jokingly called "the nettime brothers") at the second meeting of the "Medien Zentral Kommittee" during the Venice Biennale. Since 1998, Ted Byfield and Felix Stalder have moderated the main list, coordinated moderation of other lists in the nettime "family," and maintained the site as their nexus.

The name nettime was chosen as a statement against space metaphors such as cyberspace, dominant at the time.

The time of nettime is a social time, it is subjective and intensive, with condensation and extractions, segmented by social events like conferences and little meetings, and text gatherings for export into the paper world. Most people still like to read a text printed on wooden paper, more than transmitted via waves of light. Nettime is not the same time like geotime, or the time clocks go. Everyone who programs or often sits in front of a screen knows about the phenomena of being out of time, time on the net consists of different speeds, computers, humans, software, bandwidth, the only way to see a continuity of time on the net is to see it as a asynchronous network of synchronized time zones.

Nettime has been widely recognized for its seminal role stimulating and disseminating ideas about Netzkritik or Net Critique, net.art, and tactical media and pioneered practices such as "collaborative filtering". For example, in 2004 nettime was nominated for an Ars Electronica Golden Nica award. However, the moderators refuse to speak or act as representatives of an organization, preferring instead to serve inasmuch as possible as coordinators of a loose or "headless" collective. The list and related meetings were a strong influence on Bruce Sterling's 1996 science fiction novel Holy Fire.

Initially, it was both part of an early wave of, and served as an inspiration for, a number of related efforts such as Blast (1995–1998), Rhizome (1996–present), Fibreculture (2001–present), Faces-l and -empyre- (2002–present). Unlike these other efforts, which typically sought to affiliate themselves with institutions in order to become institutionalized, nettime has remained independent — at times fiercely so. Thus, unusually for a mailing list, the family of lists has successfully migrated across a series of hosts — many of them culturally significant in their own right — including in-berlin.de, desk.nl, material.net, thing.net, De Waag kein.org, bitnik.org, and servus.at.

From the beginning, the aim has been to provide a space for a new form of critical discourse on and with the nets, focussing on longer, substantive, yet non-academic writings and discussions. Nettime served early on as a pre-publishing and discussion platform to give critical thinkers and writers an international reach. Due to its particular political style, it was often seen as a European online salon, even though it had from the beginning strong non-European, mainly North-American participation.

The list, once called "the world's most world list" by Bruce Sterling, has been characterised by pragmatic approach with relatively little change to its format over the years, which has proven to be resilient and durable. The expansive projects of building a web-based platforms, reacting to and generating growing controversies, were unsustainable. The original, mainly English-language mailing list (nettime-l) has spawned several other, more local lists better suited to specific regional and or linguistic contexts, including nettiime-ann (announcements), nettime-fr (French), nettime-lat (Spanish and Portuguese), nettime-nl (Dutch), nettime-ro (Romanian), nettime-see (southeastern Europe), and nettime-zh (Chinese).

== Meetings ==
Additional Nettime meetings were held during events like HackIt, (Amsterdam) the Chaos Computer Congress (Berlin), ISEA, the Ars Electronica Festival (Linz), The MetaForum Conferences (95-96) in Budapest. Nettime's one unique event was the Nettime May Conference - Beauty and the East, organized by Ljudmila (Ljubljana). The Hybrid Workspace drew heavily from Nettime during the Documenta X in Kassel.

== Publications ==
Proceedings of the mailing list were periodically collected in print form, with limited editions of xerox copies and in connection with a related conference or event. In 1999, nettime contributions were anthologized in a book form published by Autonomedia.

- ZKP1 The Next 5 Minutes (2) Amsterdam, Netherlands, January 1996
- ZKP2 Cyberconf 5 Madrid, Spain, June 1996
- ZKP3 Metaforum III Budapest, Hungary, October 1996
- ZKP3.2.1
- ZKP4 The Beauty and the East Ljubljana, Slovenia, May 1997
- ZKP5: ReadMe! ASCII Culture and the Revenge of Knowledge. Brooklyn: Autonomedia, 1999. 556pp. ISBN 1-57027-089-9 Online Version
- ZKP6 Catalogue of the Slovenian Pavilion, Venice Biennale 2001.
