= Julia Scher =

American artist (born 1954)

- Born: 1954 (age 71–72)
- Occupation: Artist

Julia Scher (born 1954, Hollywood) is an American artist who works primarily with themes of surveillance. She uses a variety of mediums and is most known for her installation art and performance art works. Her work addresses issues of control and seduction.

== Life and work ==
Julia Scher was born in Hollywood 1954 as the daughter of a traveling salesman and a department store employee and grew up in Van Nuys, San Fernando Valley. In 1975 she received a B.A. in Painting/Sculpture/Graphic Arts from U.C.L.A., and a 1984 M.F.A. in Studio Arts, from the University of Minnesota. The title of her thesis was American Landscape. Her first video art piece about women in security was Safe & Secure in Minnesota in 1987. While her studio was based in Venice Beach Scher's work was influenced by "light and space" artists, like Larry Bell and Chris Burden, Robert Graham, Lynda Benglis. She did several sideline jobs to make a living and established her own company called "Safe and Secure Productions", installing security and surveillance equipment. At the same time Scher started using security cameras for her artwork. During the 1990s she was living and working in New York and Boston.

In 1996 Julia Scher taught the first surveillance studies class in the United States at the Massachusetts College of Art, Boston. She received a fellowship at Harvard University/Radcliffe Bunting Institute for the field Surveillance Studies 1996-1997 and has been teaching in the Visual Arts Program at the Massachusetts Institute of Technology from 1997 - 2001 and 2005 - 2006. She has also lectured at a number of institutions, including The Cooper Union for Art and Science, Hartford University Art School, U.C.L.A., U.S.C, Harvard University, Columbia University, The Institute for Advanced Study at Princeton, and Rutgers University. From 2006 to 2021 Julia Scher held the professorship for Multimedia and Performance / Surveillant Architectures at the Academy of Media Arts Cologne (Kunsthochschule fuer Medien Koeln).

== Artwork ==
Inspired by the French philosopher Michel Foucault and the sociologist Gary T. Marx, Julia Scher's work focuses on the subjects surveillance and cyber-sphere. Aiming at the exposure of dangers and ideologies of monitoring systems, Scher creates temporary and transitory web/installation/performance works that explore issues of power, control and seduction.

In the last 20 years, her research has explored social control dynamics in public space. The art projects have taken the form of interactive installations, reformulated surveillance, site tours, interventions, performances, photography, writing, net.art, linear video, and sound.

Since 1988, Scher has produced a series of installations called Security by Julia. These have taken different forms but often involve a person wearing a security uniform and an invitation to the viewer to actively participate in surveillance culture. Other variations of the installations have included soothing voices and baby blankets.

Securityland and Wonderland are elaborate online projects Julia Scher has created with äda ‘web, launched in 1995 and 1997, respectively; they were preceded by an introductory trailer titled Danger Dirty Data in 1995. Scher offers various areas for user exploration, many of which raise issues of control and personal privacy. All manner of psychologically and physically invasive services and products are seductively pitched at the visitor, promising to alleviate problems caused internally and externally. Loosely based on architectural and clinical models, Securityland and Wonderland completely destabilize the notion of neutral or straightforward interchange, using inflections that are libidinal, gendered, quasi-institutional and subtly threatening.

== Exhibitions ==
Scher's work has been shown in several solo and group exhibitions including the Venice Biennale, the Whitney Biennial, the Wexner Center for the Arts, Columbus, Ohio, the Walker Art Center, Minneapolis, Minnesota, Tapias Museum, Barcelona, Museo Nacional, Centro de Arte, Reina Sofia, Madrid, the San Francisco Museum of Modern Art, the Museé d’art Moderne, Paris, Künstlerhaus, Stuttgart, Kölnischer Kunstverein, Köln, the Institute of Contemporary Arts, London and the MoMA PS1, New York.

== Sources ==
- Brian Wallis, Andrew Hultkrans, Avital Ronell, and Bill Horrigan (2002). Always There, Lukas & Sternberg Publishers. ISBN 0971119376
- Scher, Julia (2002). Tell Me When You're Ready, Works 1990-1995, introduction by Anna Indych, PFM publishers. ISBN 978-0971909809.
- Frohne, Ursula, Levin, Tom, Weibel, Peter (2002). Ctrl_Space. Rhetorics of Surveillance from Bentham to Big Brother. ZKM Karlsruhe, Cambridge, MA: The MIT Press. pp. 286–291. ISBN 0262621657.
- Baumgärtel, Tilman (2001). net.art 2.0 - New Materials towards Net art. Nürnberg: Verlag für Moderne Kunst Nürnberg. pp. 66–77. ISBN 3-933096-66-9.
