= Sab0t =

Sab0t is a Mexico City based tabloid pamphlet focused on art, activism, experimental narratives, media and net-culture. It is edited collectively using open source software, by members of the Possibleworlds.org virtual community, which is an economically self-sustained media initiative of the Fiction Department (Departamento de Ficción).

Issue 0 was introduced in summer 2005 during a media art exhibition by Daniel García-Andujar and Fran Ilich. In 2007 the publication was presented at Documenta 12 magazines, and during the first semester of 2007 published an issue on la Otra Cultura of The Other Campaign of the Zapatista Army of National Liberation.
