= Alexei Shulgin =

Russian contemporary artist

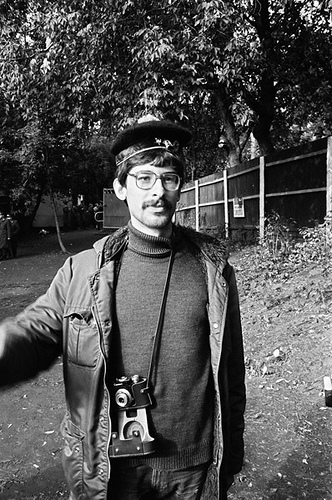
Alexei Shulgin, 1987

Alexei Shulgin (Russian: Алексей Шульгин; born 1963) is a Russian contemporary artist and musician known for his work in net.art, software art and media art. His projects include the browser-based artwork Form Art (1997), the computer-based musical performance project 386 DX (1998) and the art collective Electroboutique, co-founded with Aristarkh Chernyshev in 2004.

== Career ==
Shulgin was born in Moscow in 1963 and studied cybernetics at the Moscow Institute of Steel and Alloys. He began working with photography in the 1980s and founded the Immediate Photography Group in 1987.

During the 1990s, Shulgin became involved in internet art. His early online projects included Hot Pictures, an electronic photography gallery established in 1994, and the Moscow WWWArt Centre, founded in 1995.

In 1997, Shulgin launched Desktop Is, an online exhibition inviting participants to submit screenshots of their computer desktops. The project treated the desktop interface as a medium for visual expression, bringing together contributions from users of different computer systems. Matthew Mirapaul discussed the project in The New York Times in December 1997, while Rhizome later identified it as an early example of collaborative internet art.

Also in 1997, Shulgin and American artist Natalie Bookchin co-authored Introduction to net.art (1994–1999), a satirical manifesto examining the emerging net.art movement. Structured as a guide for aspiring internet artists, the text combined practical instructions with ironic commentary on artistic identity, online culture and the conventions of the contemporary art world. In 1999, the manifesto was exhibited in a version engraved in stone.

In 2004, Shulgin and Aristarkh Chernyshev established Electroboutique, a collaborative project combining media art, product design and interactive electronic objects. In a 2008 interview with Rhizome, Shulgin described the collective's shift away from internet-based art toward physical objects resembling commercial products. The artists developed the term "CritiPop" for an approach that combined the visual language of consumer goods and advertising with social and cultural criticism. In 2009, Shulgin and Chernyshev received the Kandinsky Prize in the category Media Art: Project of the Year.

From November 2011 to February 2012, Electroboutique presented a pop-up exhibition at London's Science Museum. The exhibition featured modified electronic consumer products, including distorted screens and interactive objects that referenced familiar commercial technologies. Writing for Vice, Kevin Holmes discussed the works in relation to consumer culture, technological design and corporate influence.

== Artistic work ==
=== Form Art ===
In 1997, Shulgin created Form Art, a browser-based artwork using HTML form elements as its primary visual and interactive material. The work presents buttons, text fields, checkboxes and other interface elements as parts of an artwork, altering their conventional functions and the expectations of users navigating the pages.

Shulgin was among the artists associated with the net.art movement of the 1990s, which explored the artistic possibilities and conventions of networked digital technologies.

Form Art subsequently became part of digital art preservation efforts by Rhizome. Because the appearance and behavior of HTML interface elements vary between browsers and operating systems, the work can look substantially different from its original presentation. Rhizome used its browser emulation project Oldweb.today to demonstrate the artwork in historical browser environments, including versions of Netscape Navigator.

=== 386 DX ===
In 1998, Shulgin created 386 DX, a musical performance project built around an obsolete personal computer running Windows 3.1. Using MIDI files and text-to-speech software, the computer performed cover versions of popular songs. Shulgin referred to the project as "the world's first cyberpunk rock band".

The project was presented in concert settings and as a street performance, including a performance in Graz, Austria, in 2000. The Garage Museum of Contemporary Art documents the work as part of its collection.

386 DX was included in the 2019 New Museum exhibition The Art Happens Here: Net Art's Archival Poetics, which presented works from Rhizome's Net Art Anthology. Recordings associated with the project were released as The Best of 386 DX and Biggest Smash Hits, the latter through the Staalplaat label.

== Selected exhibitions ==
- 2011–2012 – Electroboutique Pop Up (with Aristarkh Chernyshev), Science Museum, London.
- 2012 – Requiem (Electroboutique), Multimedia Art Museum, Moscow.
- 2019 – The Art Happens Here: Net Art's Archival Poetics (group exhibition), New Museum, New York.
