= Net.art =

Group of artists that use the Internet as their medium

net.art refers to an artistic movement that emerged in the context of Internet art in the mid-1990s. The artists most commonly associated with the movement include Vuk Ćosić, Jodi, Alexei Shulgin, Olia Lialina and Heath Bunting. Although they shared an interest in the Internet as an artistic and communicative medium, their individual practices differed considerably.

The term "net.art" is also used as a synonym for net art or Internet art and covers a much wider range of artistic practices. In this wider definition, net.art refers to art that uses the Internet as its medium. Typically, net.art has the Internet and the specific sociocultural context it spawned as its subject matter, although this is not required.

The German critic Tilman Baumgärtel, drawing on the ideas of American critic Clement Greenberg, has argued for a "media specificity" of net.art. According to the introduction to his book net.art. Materialien zur Netzkunst, the specific qualities of net.art are "connectivity, global reach, multimediality, immateriality, interactivity and egality".

== History of the net.art movement ==
The net.art movement arose in the context of the wider development of Internet art in the mid-1990s. The term came to be associated with a loose group of artists using the Internet both as an artistic medium and as a space for communication and collaboration. In 1996, while Nettime co-founder Pit Schultz was preparing a project in Berlin with artists he had met online, the term net.art came into use. The project was subsequently presented as part of the new-media exhibition Files, curated by Oliver Schwarz at the Bunker in Berlin.

In 1996, the net.art per se meeting of artists and theorists took place in Trieste. The event was commemorated by a fake CNN website entitled Specific Net.art found possible.

In March 1997, Alexei Shulgin circulated an account of the term's origin on the Nettime mailing list, according to which Vuk Ćosić had encountered the expression "net.art" in a garbled email rendered largely unreadable because of incompatible software. Ćosić later stated that Shulgin had invented this account, and recalled instead that Schultz had suggested the term during discussions among the group around 1995 or 1996.

== Online social networks ==
net.artists built digital art communities through practices of web hosting, web art curating, collaboration and online communication. They were active on mailing lists and online platforms such as Rhizome, File festival, Electronic Language International Festival, Nettime, Syndicate and Eyebeam.

net.artists like Jodi developed a particular form of e-mail art, or spam mail art, through text reprocessing and ASCII art. The term "spam art" was coined by Frederic Madre to describe forms of disruptive intervention in mailing lists in which seemingly nonsensical texts were generated by simple scripts, online forms or typed by hand.

Related practices included the "Codeworks" of artists such as Mez or mi ga, as well as robots such as Mailia, which analyzed emails and replied to them. "Codeworks" is a term coined by poet Alan Sondheim to describe textual experiments involving faux-code and non-executable script or mark-up languages.

== Tactical media net art ==
By questioning structures such as the navigation window and challenging their functionality, net.artists drew attention to the conventions through which users interacted with the Internet. Artists such as Olia Lialina, in My Boyfriend Came Back From The War, and the duo Jodi, with their series of pop-up interventions and browser-crashing applets, engaged directly with the materiality of navigation. Such experiments became associated with what was described as "browser art", which was further developed by the British collective I/O/D through its experimental navigator WebStalker.

Alexei Shulgin and Heath Bunting played with the structure of advertisement portals by establishing lists of keywords unlikely to be searched for but nonetheless existing on the web as URLs or metadata components. They used this relational data to create paths of navigation and new combinations of readable text.

Rachel Greene has associated net.art with tactical media as a form of Detournement. Greene writes: "The subversion of corporate websites shares a blurry border with hacking and agitprop practices that would become an important field of net art, often referred to as 'tactical media'."

== Hacker culture ==
The Jodi collective's work uses the aesthetics of computer errors, code tricks, faux-code and faux-virus. Such works question conventional browsing experiences by foregrounding the internal structures of digital environments. The collective 0100101110101101.org expanded the idea of "art hacktivism" by performing code interventions and perturbations in art festivals such as the Venice Biennale. The collective irational.org likewise carried out interventions in physical and social spaces.

In a 1998 Eyebeam mailing-list discussion, Brett Stalbaum distinguished hacking from net.art while describing artists as "culture hackers" who enter cultural systems and make them do things they were not intended to do.

A direct intersection between net.art and malicious software occurred with Biennale.py, a computer virus created by 0100101110101101.org and the hacker group EpidemiC for the 49th Venice Biennale in 2001. Presented in the Slovenian Pavilion, the virus functioned both as executable code and as an artwork, with its source code displayed and distributed as part of the project.

== Critique of the art world ==
During the late-1990s dot-com boom, the online publication Telepolis published a series of German- and English-language columns on net art. Edited by writer and artist Armin Medosch, the material published at Telepolis included American artist and net theorist Mark Amerika's "Amerika Online" columns. These columns satirized the tendency of net.artists, Amerika himself included, to take themselves too seriously. In response, European net.artists impersonated Amerika in faux emails intended to deconstruct the marketing strategies used by net.artists seeking art-world legitimacy. Writing in The New York Times, Matthew Mirapaul suggested that the exchanges were intended to raise American awareness of European electronic artists and might also contain an element of jealousy.

Many net.art interventions also addressed the relationship between art and cultural institutions such as Tate. Harwood, a member of the Mongrel collective, in his work Uncomfortable Proximity (the first online project commissioned by Tate), mirrored Tate's own website and introduced new images and ideas collaged from his own experiences, his readings of Tate works and publicity materials connected with the institution.

Alexander R. Galloway, in an e-flux article entitled "Jodi's Infrastructure", argues that Jodi's approach to net.art, which engages directly with the structures governing code, is uniquely modernist because form and content converge in the artwork.

Some projects used websites to store, reproduce or reorganize art-related and documentary material. Examples listed in this context include Joachim Schmid's Archiv, as well as Hybrids and Copies by Eva & Franco Mattes under the pseudonym 0100101110101101.org. Cloning, plagiarism and collective creation were explored as alternative approaches, as in the Refresh Project.

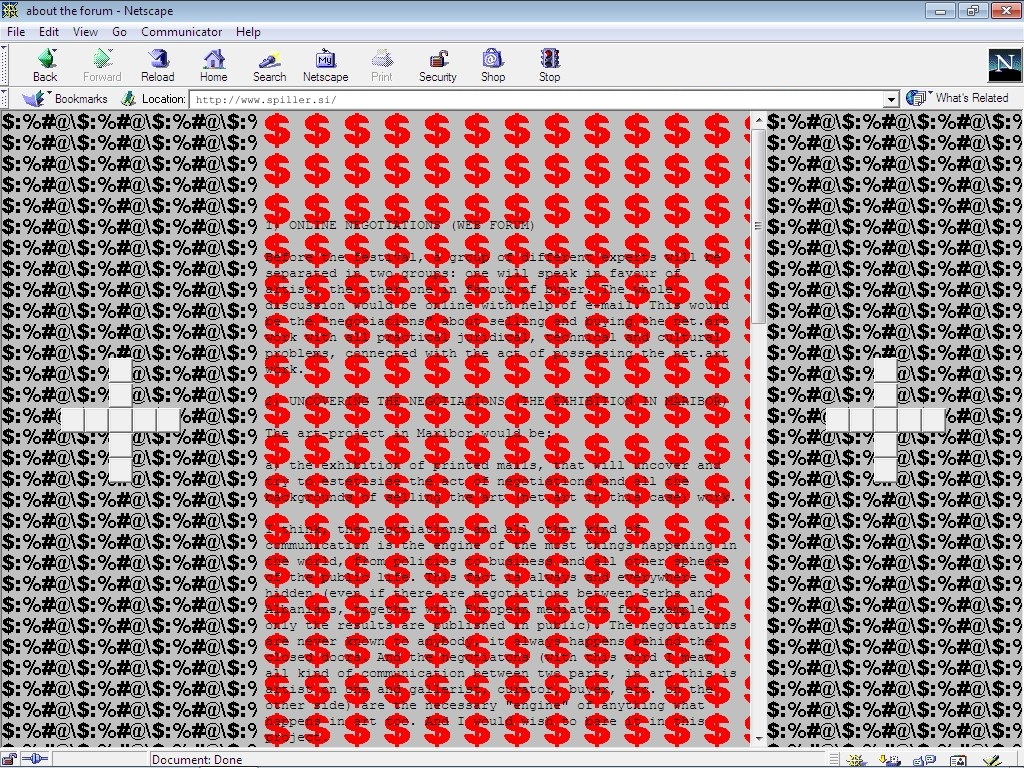
A Screenshot of Teo Spiller's net.art net.art.trade

Olia Lialina addressed questions of digital curating and ownership through her web platform Teleportacia.org, an online gallery created to promote and sell net.art works. Lialina presented the URL itself as a guarantee of a work's originality, arguing that control of the location address could function as a form of ownership or access control. This attempt to give net.art an economic identity and a form of legitimation within the art world was questioned within the net.art sphere itself, although the project was also understood as a satire. In May 1999, Teo Spiller sold the web art project Megatronix to Ljubljana Municipal Museum, calling the project net.art.trade.

Teleportacia.org became an experiment concerning originality in the context of digital reproduction and remix culture. Its URL-based claim to originality was challenged by Eva & Franco Mattes, who, under the pseudonym 0100101110101101.org, cloned the site's content and produced an unauthorized mirror site that presented the net.art works in the same context and quality as the original. Lialina's The Last Real Net Art Museum, launched in 2000, similarly explored copying and preservation by collecting remixes and reinterpretations of My Boyfriend Came Back From The War.

Online social-network experiments such as the Poietic Generator predated the net.art movement, were associated with it during its active period, and continued afterward.

== Preservation and historicization ==
The preservation of net art presents particular difficulties because works may become inaccessible as browsers, software and online platforms change. In 2016, Rhizome launched the Net Art Anthology, an online exhibition presenting 100 works from the history of net art, including works that were restored or re-performed for contemporary access.

Digital preservation was a central component of the project, using tools and frameworks including Webrecorder and Emulation as a Service (EaaS). The project culminated in the 2019 exhibition The Art Happens Here: Net Art's Archival Poetics at the New Museum, which presented sixteen works selected from the anthology.

== See also ==
- Digital culture
- History of the Internet
- Internet art
- Glitch art
- Net-poetry
- Surfing club

== Bibliography ==
- Baranski Sandrine, La musique en réseau, une musique de la complexité ?, Éditions universitaires européennes, 2010 La musique en réseau
- Bosma, Josephine, Nettitudes Let's Talk Net Art, Nai010 publishers, Rotterdam, 2011, ISBN 978-90-5662-800-0
- (in Spanish) Martín Prada, Juan, Prácticas artísticas e Internet en la época de las redes sociales, Editorial AKAL, Madrid, 2012, ISBN 978-84-460-3517-6
