= EToys.com =

Online toy retailer

eToys.com
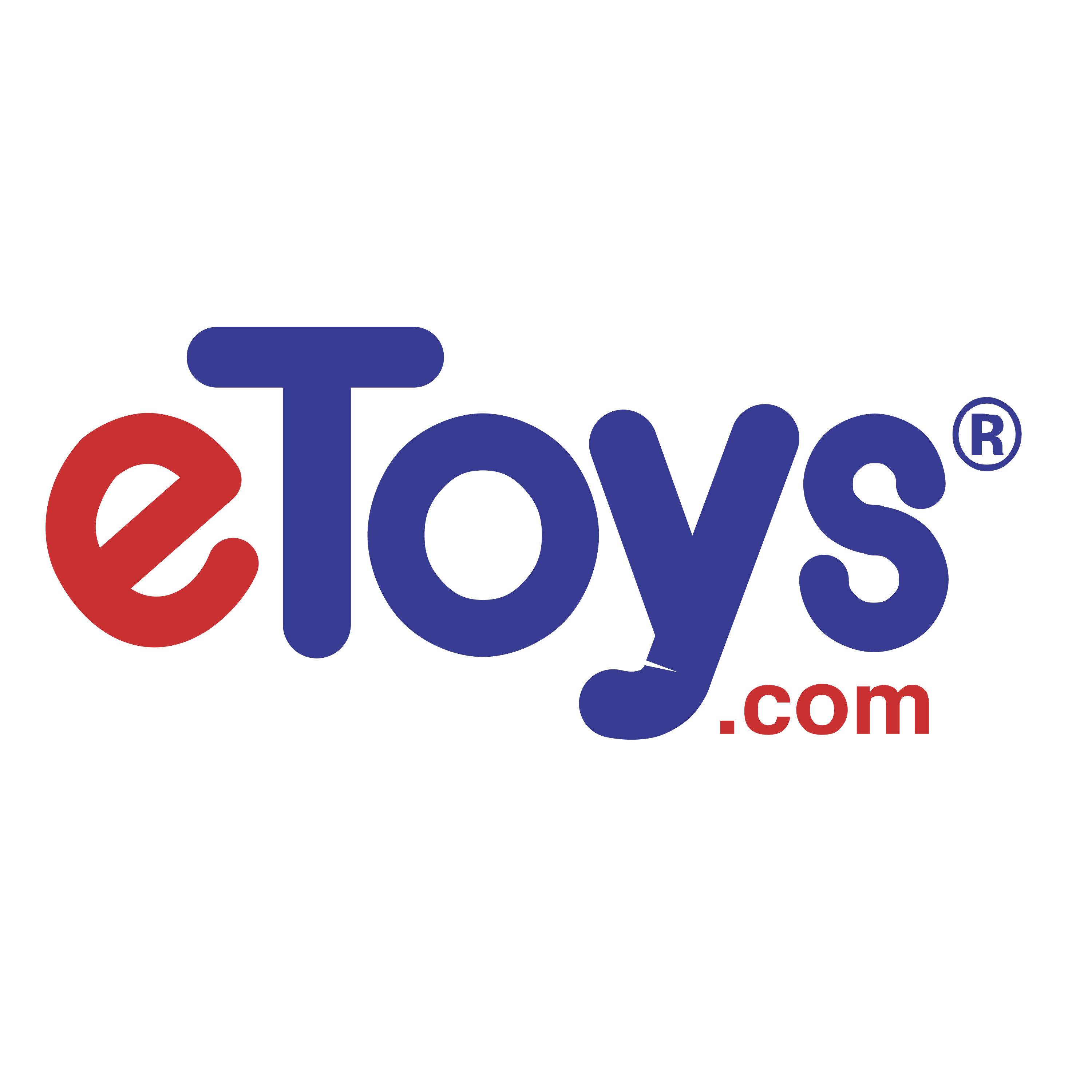
- Industry: Toys
- Founded: November 3, 1997; 28 years ago
- Defunct: 2009; 17 years ago
- Fate: Acquired by Toys R Us
- Products: Toys
- Parent: Toys "R" Us
- Website: www.etoys.com

eToys.com was a retail website that sold toys via the Internet. It was established by a startup company of the same name on November 3, 1997. After an initial public offering on January 4, 1999, the company quickly shot up in value, becoming emblematic of the dot-com bubble. The company went bankrupt on April 1, 2001, and shut down soon thereafter. The etoys.com domain went through a number of changes of ownership afterwards, and has been owned by Toys "R" Us since February 2009.

== History ==
eToys was launched on November 3, 1997, as an Idealab company. In 1999, eToys held an IPO. Shares were issued at $20. At the end of the first day of trading, the stock closed at $76 a share. eMarketer was once quoted as saying; "Put simply, eToys is the benchmark against which all other toy sites are measured". In 1999, the company was involved in a high-profile dispute with Swiss art site etoy. EToys attempted to seize the etoy.com domain from etoy on the grounds that it was confusingly similar to its own domain, but it relented after widespread internet outrage.

== Bankruptcy ==
Around March 7, 2001, The Wall Street Journal reported that KB Toys acquired the bulk of eToys' remaining assets for $5 million. Bain Capital owns KB Toys. The law firm Traub, Bonacquist & Fox represented the creditors in the Chapter 11 bankruptcy proceedings. Paul Traub, a partner in the firm, had shortly before formed a company called Asset Disposition Advisors, LLC with Barry Gold. This relationship became controversial when Gold was appointed CEO of eToys. Some complained there was a conflict of interest, though a judge later found no fault.

== Subsequent ownership ==
Nearly all the eToys assets were acquired by KB Toys in two separate bankruptcy auctions, then later sold to D. E. Shaw, a New York-based hedge fund. The eToys.com website was eventually reopened by eToys Direct Inc., a descendant of Internet startup and KB Toys partner Brainplay.com, and a subsidiary of Parent Company. It continued to market toys by mail order under the eToys name through both the website and printed catalogs. Parent Company and nine of its subsidiaries including eToys Direct filed for Chapter 11 bankruptcy on December 22, 2008. eToys.com was acquired by Toys "R" Us in February 2009.
