= Heath Bunting =

British artist (born 1966)

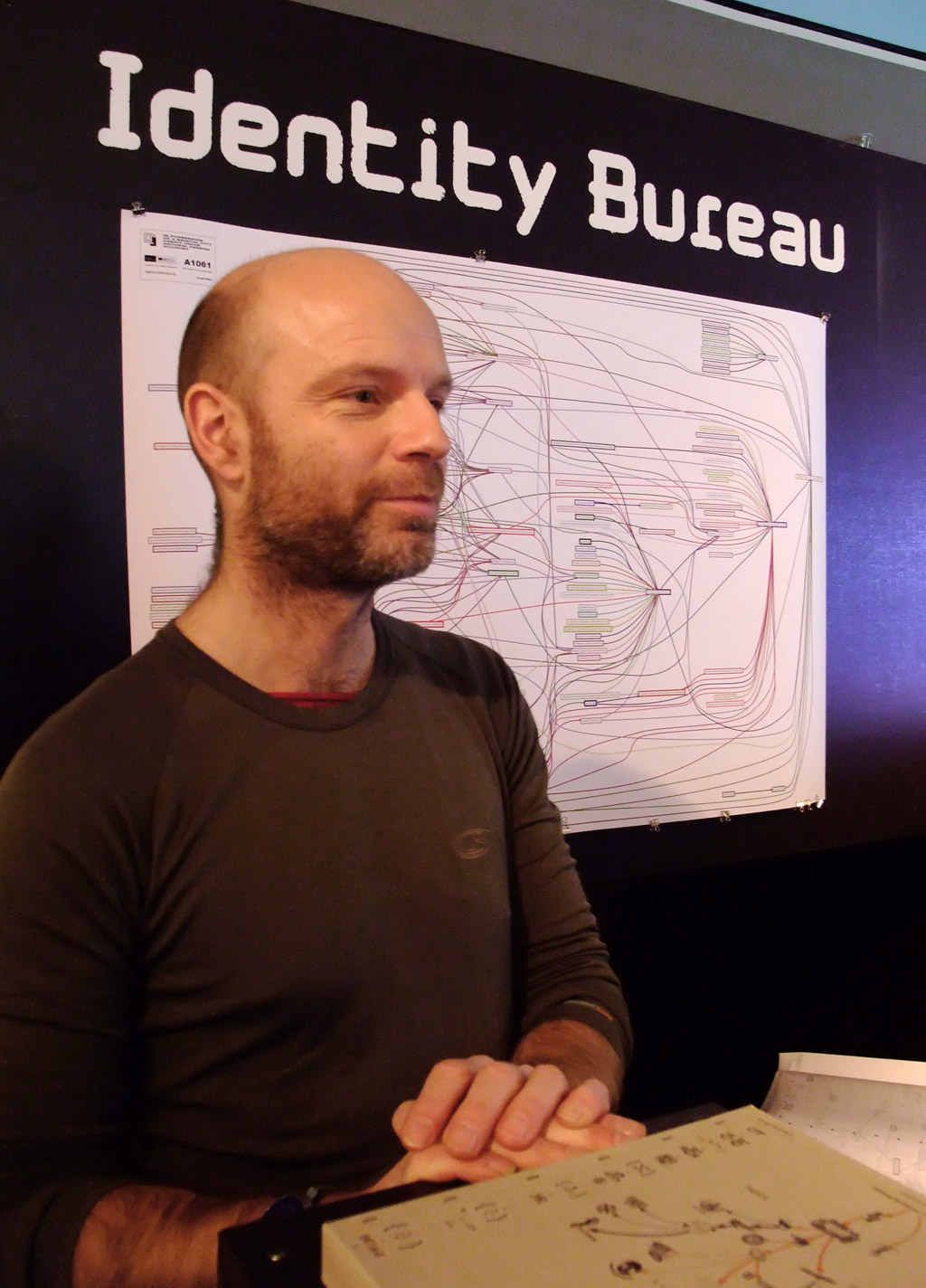
- Heath Bunting at Transmediale, Berlin, 4 February 2011
- Born: 1966 (age 59–60)
- Occupation: Artist
- Years active: 1980s-present
- Style: Conceptual art, net.art, culture jamming, tactical media
- Website: http://irational.org

Heath Bunting (born 1966) is a British contemporary artist. Based in Bristol, he is a co-founder of the website irational.org, and was one of the early practitioners in the 1990s of Net.art. Bunting's work is based on creating open and democratic systems by modifying communications technologies and social systems. His work often explores the porosity of borders, both in physical space and online. In 1997, his online work Visitors Guide to London was included in the 10th documenta curated by Swiss curator Simon Lamunière. An activist, he created a dummy site for the European Lab for Network Collision (CERN).

== Biography ==
Born in 1966, Bunting became active in the contemporary art world in the 1980s. In 1994, he planned to open the first cybercafe in London with Ivan Pope, however they were beaten to it by Cyberia. In 1996, he co-founded the website irational.org with Daniel García Andújar, Rachel Baker, and Minerva Cuevas. It was on the site where Bunting first displayed his internet art works as part of the Net.art project.

== Work ==
=== Own, Be Owned, or Remain Invisible ===
Created in 1998, _readme.html is a work of net.art: a simple web page with a white background and light grey text taken from an article about Heath Bunting. A vast majority of the words are hypertext, but not all. As coded for by simple HTML attributes, hyperlinked words turn from grey to black once visited.

In Own, Be Owned or Remain Invisible, Bunting makes use of appropriation. The work utilises an article about Heath Bunting written by James Flint of The Daily Telegraph. Instead of presenting the article in its traditional form, Bunting links nearly every word to [insert word].com and alters the color-scheme of the document as per his white-on-white period. Some of the linked domains may have been owned in the past twelve years, but are no longer owned, thereby touching on the transience of Internet ownership. Bunting's work also shows the range of banal or absurd domain names that companies have purchased. Not all words in the article are hyperlinked, however. Through these unclaimed words he spells out how the article touches on his own identity.

=== King's Cross Phone-In ===
On Friday, 5 August 1994, Bunting orchestrated a scheme that involved many people calling public phones in and around London King's Cross railway station. On his then-website Cybercafe.org, founded in 1992, Bunting posted the numbers of all the public phones and encouraged his followers to do one of the following: call in a pattern, call at a certain time, call and speak to a stranger, or show up and pick up the telephone. Bunting used his website as an informative source to let his readers know how to partake in his project.

When 5 August arrived, Bunting went to King's Cross to pick up telephone calls. Many people called in and he witnessed as casual passers-by engaged in conversations with strangers who were perhaps halfway across the world. The project brought people together, if only for a few brief moments, to create a network through the communication medium of telephones. In Digital Humanities, a class by Professor Michael Shanks at Stanford University, the project is described: "the train station was transformed into an art platform and the unsuspecting commuters and workers in the area became the audience." This is an early example of a flash mob and instigating action through a then-passive medium. Bunting's work has been compared to the work of Allan Kaprow, one of the pioneers in performance art.

=== Pirate Listening Station ===
Between 1999 and 2009, Bunting hosted the Pirate Listening Station which allowed visitors to the site to tune and listen in to London pirate radio stations. It is an early example of an online listening station.

=== BorderXing ===
Commissioned by the Tate Gallery and the Luxembourg-based Fondation Musée d'Art Moderne Grand-Duc Jean (Mudam) in 2002, BorderXing details ways to cross international borders throughout Europe without legal documentation. It provides video, photography, maps, and necessary materials on the project website. It demonstrates how to succeed without being located by dogs, and when not to run to avoid being shot. There is even a supplemental botanical guide so you can avoid poisonous plants. Bunting reveals that restriction of movement set in place by governments and bureaucracies. The project shows not only the restriction of physical borders, but the concept that the internet is not a borderless space. Bunting limits access to the project. You must be at a designated location to access the site or apply to be an authorized client.

=== The Status Project ===
Commenced in 2004, The Status Project taps into the themes of identity, hierarchy, and power.
