= Surfing club =

An internet Surf Club is a group site (usually a blog) where artists and others link to "surfed" or "surfable" items on the Web and post their own creative work. "Nasty Nets Internet Surfing Club" was the first to use the words "surfing club". Critic Matt Fuller noted two characteristics of surfing clubs as artistic milieus: "Firstly, each piece of work is not especially apart from the other works by the artist or groups that produced it - it is part of a practice. Secondly, each work is assembled out of parts that belong to a collectively available resource. So this again, is something set aside from the standard issue art modes, unique visions, talented individuals and all the rest of it. It is the power to connect."

== See also ==
- net.art
- 4chan

== Literature ==
- Surfing Clubs: organized notes and comments. by Marcin Ramocki
- Members Only: Loshadka Surfs the Web
- Video: Surfing Club at plug.in on Rhizome
- What the hell happened to Rhizome Why isn't it more like 4chan?
- When you go surfclubbin', don't forget your hat.
- Surf Art Continuity by Tom Moody (artist)
- Commodify Your Consumption: Tactical Surfing / Wakes of Resistance by Curt Cloninger
- Surfing an Archive : post-photography and posts by Joel Vacheron
- Surf Clubs by Michelle Kasprzak
