= Eva and Franco Mattes =

Duo of artists based in New York City

Eva & Franco Mattes
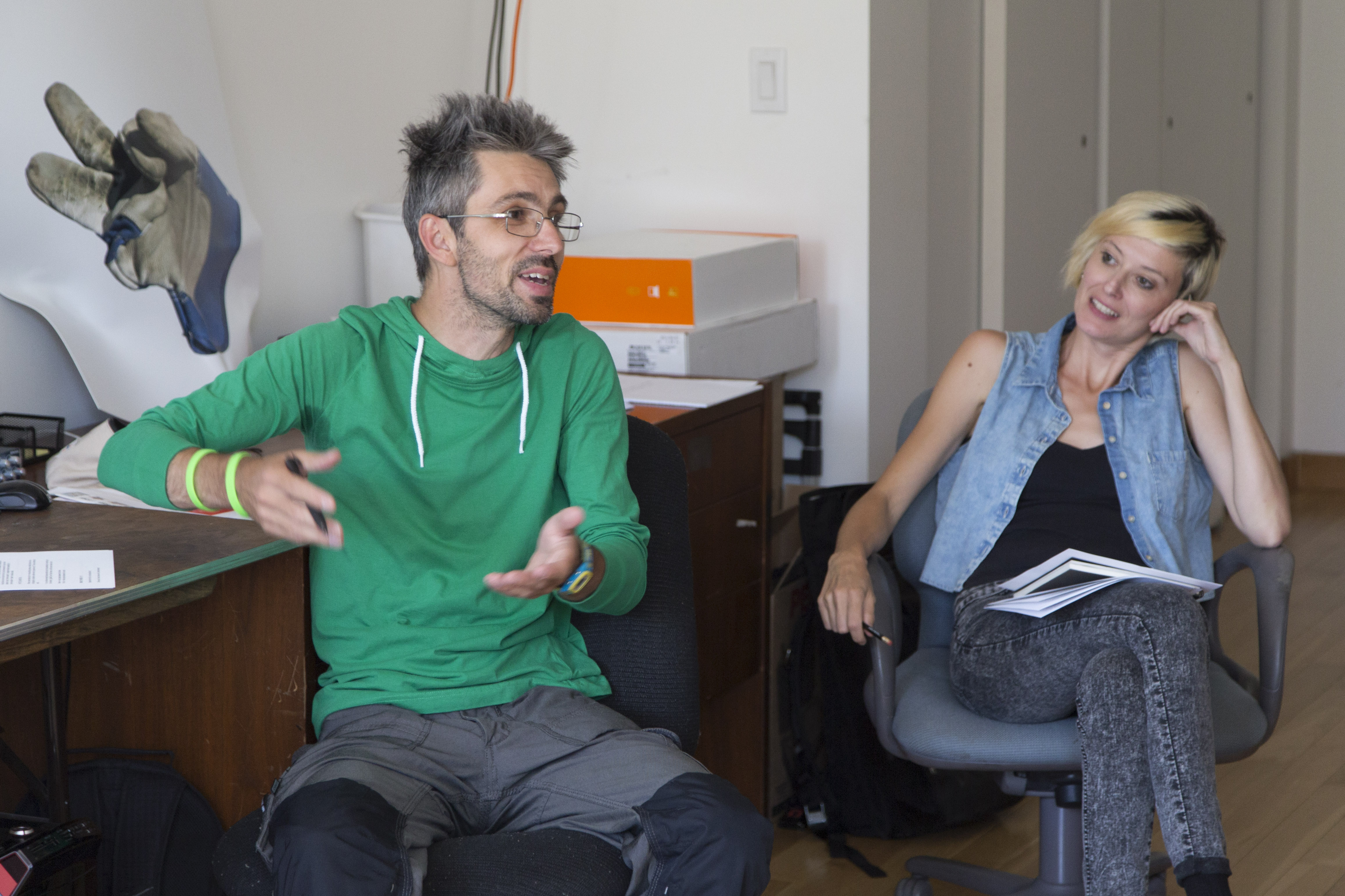
- Mattes in 2014
- Born: Italy
- Known for: Conceptual art, new media art
- Website: 0100101110101101.org

Eva & Franco Mattes are a duo of artists based in New York City, operating under the pseudonym 0100101110101101.org.

== Activity ==
From 1995–97, the Mattes toured major museums in Europe and the United States, and stole 50 fragments from well-known works by artists such as Duchamp, Kandinsky, Beuys, and Rauschenberg. This work, titled "Stolen Pieces", exhibited the stolen fragments in glass cabinets: a porcelain piece of Duchamp's urinal, skin from an Alberto Burri painting, etc. They have manipulated video games, internet technologies and street advertising to reveal truths concealed by contemporary society. Their media facades were believable enough to elicit embarrassing reactions from governments, the public, and the art world. In addition, they have orchestrated several unpredictable mass performances, staged outside art spaces, and involved unwitting audiences in scenarios that mingle truth and falsehood to the point of being indistinguishable. Their performances—for which they have been sued multiple times—include affixing fake architectural heritage plaques (An Ordinary Building, 2006), rolling out a media campaign for a non-existent action movie (United We Stand, 2005) and even convincing the people of Vienna that Nike had purchased the city's historic Karlsplatz and was about to rename it "Nikeplatz" (Nike Ground, 2003).

=== Internet projects ===
The couple first gained notoriety in 1998 by taking the domain name vaticano.org, in order to undermine the Catholic Church's official website. They then went on a cloning spree, copying and remixing other artists' works, e.g., Jodi.org. They also targeted "closed" websites, such as Hell.com, thereby turning private art into public art. From 2000 to 2003, the full content of the hard drive of their computer, including emails and private files, was publicly available via their website. This project was called 'life_sharing', recalling "file sharing" (via peer-to-peer networks), that was particularly popular at that time.

This activity is born out of their desire to create truly interactive works (as opposed to most net.art that they believe only poses as interactive). They define this in an interview with Jaka Zelenznikar where they discuss audiences reaching a website, regardless of it being the subject of net.art or not, and "by their mouse clicks they choose one of the routes fixed by the author(s), they only decide what to see before and what after". They argue that this is not true interactivity and compare it to a gallery space, suggesting that it too could be called interactive since one is able to decide what room to look at and when. Their definition of interactivity is more associated with the freedom the user has to not only govern their own movements but to duplicate, manipulate and simulate the subject matter. This includes doing something that is not predicted by the author of the website, "the beholder becomes an artist and the artist becomes a beholder: a powerless witness of what happens to his work." Their 2010 work, "No Fun" epitomizes the sentiment in the previous quote because it utilizes the social networking and video chat website Chatroulette to exhibit Franco Mattes staging a false suicide (hanging) in part of the screen and people's responses to it in other parts of the screen. Another example of their work, where the audience is the subject, is "Emily's video" (2012) where they invited volunteers to watch what they called "the worst video ever," combined of clips from the Darknet. The viewers were filmed whilst watching it and the original video was destroyed. What remains are the reactions of the viewers, recorded on webcams. When displayed in a gallery setting the monitor is positioned on its side with the reaction playing on the top half while the bottom section remains black. This space is where the original video would be positioned and also allows for the live audience to catch their reflection. The work is also set up to face away from the gallery's entrance in order to enable new visitors to first see the reactions of the live audience before watching the ones on the screen.

In the video series Dark Content (2015–2016), Eva and Franco Mattes interviewed workers employed to remove disturbing or prohibited material from online platforms. The interviewees' identities were concealed through computer-generated avatars and synthetic voices. Initially distributed via the Tor network, the series examined the largely invisible human labour involved in internet content moderation.

=== Darko Maver ===
The Mattes shocked the mainstream art world with the invention of "Darko Maver", a reclusive radical artist, who achieved cult status and was paid tribute to in the 48th Venice Biennale, before being exposed as pure fiction. The fiction was that this Serbian artist created very gruesome and realistic models of murder victims and positioned them so to obtain media attention. He was exposing the brutality of war in the Balkans to the world. In reality, the photos were found on the web site rotten.com and depicted real-life atrocities. They mutated reality to mimic fiction but in doing so produced an alternative reality. Their message to the world was: while artists are making shocking artwork, absorbed by the market, real violence is being perpetrated and ignored by a media-anesthetized world.

=== Works on Second Life ===
Eva and Franco produced several works employing the video game Second Life. The first of these was the series titled "Portraits", photographs taken of avatars in the game printed onto canvas. In an interview with Domenico Quaranta, they explained that they "see Avatars as 'self-portraits'. Unlike most portraits, though, they are not based on the way you 'are', but rather on the way you 'want to be'. Actually, our works are not portraits, but rather 'pictures of self-portraits'." The Mattes wanted to stress that our culture revolves around plagiarism. They followed up by saying that their project was not a completely original piece. In fact, they stated that anyone who claims that their work is an original, should really "start doubting" their mental health, because practically everything in this world, not just art, is a reproduction or remix of something that has been released before. One of these portraits went on to be destroyed by a young artist at the MAMbo Museum, Bologna. He was reportedly a fan of their work but not the prints. The, now destroyed, portrait has become a new work, 'Killing Zoe', another edition to their attempts to debunk originality; this has only become something new due it being a part of a new event, all the subject matter is the same but it comes in a new form.

Inviting other members of Second Life to participate or watch, the Mattes created Synthetic Performances. Before scripting their own performances, in 2007, they started out with Reenactments of historical performances: Marina Abramović's Imponderabilia, Gilbert&George's The Singing Sculpture, Valie Export's Tapp und Tastkino, Vito Acconci's Seedbed, and Chris Burden's Shoot.

=== Riccardo Uncut ===
"Riccardo Uncut" (2018) is a nearly 1 hour and 30 minute video consisting of photos and videos of a man called Riccardo. Riccardo was chosen by the artists from a social media notice in which the Mattes offered $1,000 to anyone willing to give full access to the photos and videos in their phone to be turned into art. There are around 3,000 photos shot between 2004 and 2017 in the video; photos of daily life things such as work, home and food and other more adventurous photos of travels, some art galleries and architecture. The project lets the viewer into the archive made of more than 10 years of memories of Riccardo's life. The work was commissioned by the Whitney Museum of American Art.

=== Ceiling Cat ===
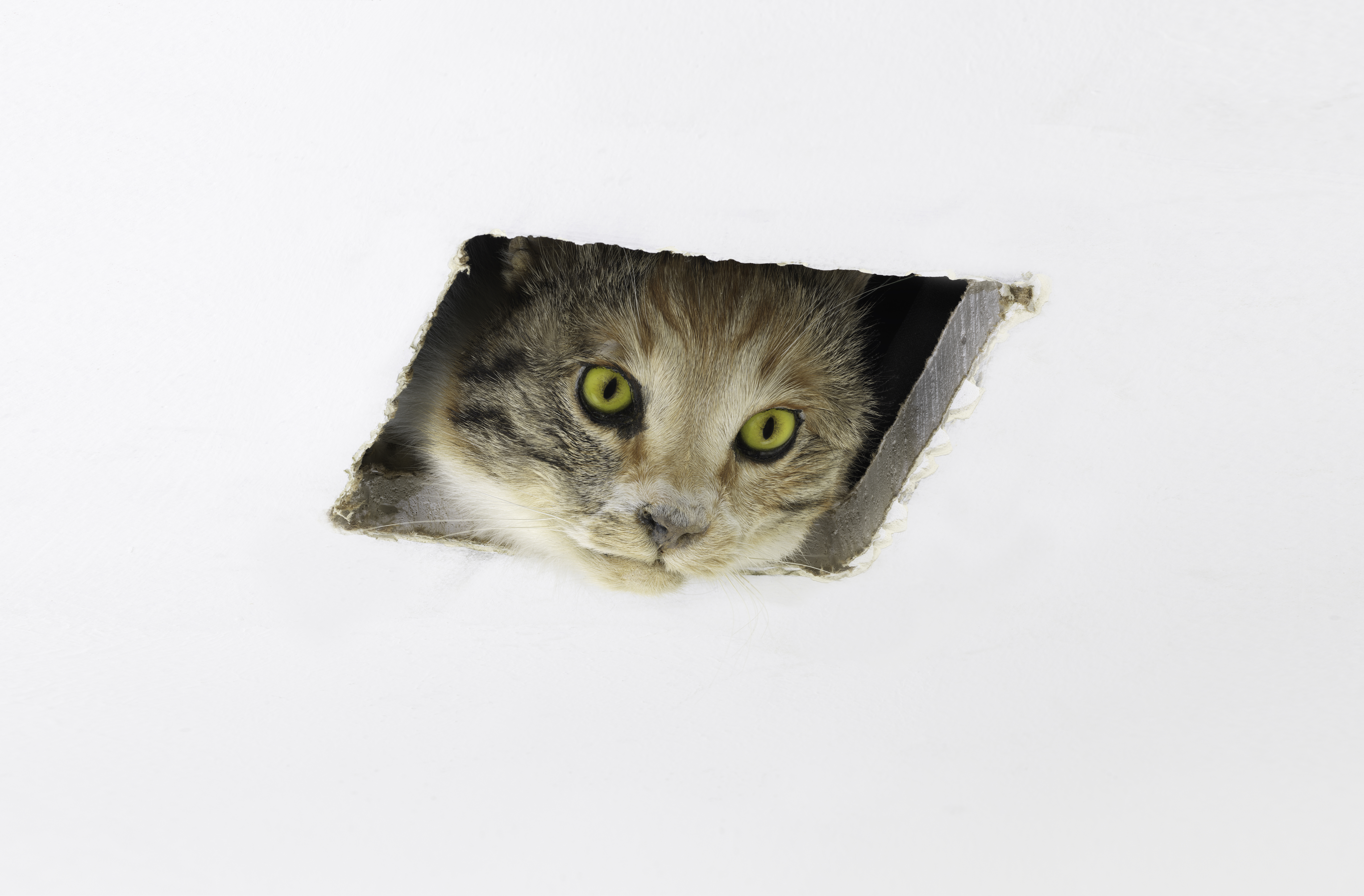
The Ceiling Cat artwork

"Ceiling Cat" (2016) is the sculptural recreation of the old internet meme: a taxidermy cat peeking through a hole in the ceiling. After the San Francisco Museum of Modern Art acquired the work, the artists made an agreement with the museum to give up ownership of the photo, so that anybody can copy it and use it for whatever purpose, free of charge.

== Exhibitions ==
Eva and Franco Mattes' art has been exhibited at these institutions:

- the Biennale of Sydney (2016)
- Whitechapel Gallery, London (2016)
- Hammer Museum, Los Angeles (2016)
- Minneapolis Institute of Art (2013)
- SITE Santa Fe (2012)
- Sundance Film Festival (2012)
- MoMA PS1, New York (2009)
- Performa, New York (2007, 2009)
- National Art Museum of China (2008)
- Collection Lambert, Avignon (2006)
- New Museum, New York (2005)
- Walker Art Center, Minneapolis (2001)
- Manifesta, Frankfurt (2002)
- the Venice Biennale (2001)
