= Etoy =

European digital art group

etoy is a Swiss-based European artist group founded in 1994. The group is known for conceptual, digital and performance art and for adopting a corporate identity in which its members appear as etoy.AGENTS. In 1996, its digital hijack project received the Golden Nica in the World Wide Web category of the Prix Ars Electronica. In 1999 and 2000, etoy became involved in a widely reported domain-name dispute with the online toy retailer eToys.com, which the artists developed into the online project Toywar.

== History ==
etoy was created in 1994 by seven original founders whose backgrounds included sound production, art, design, law, public relations and corporate identity. From the outset, the group adopted a corporate structure and visual identity: the members merged their individual identities into a single digital identity and appeared publicly as etoy.AGENTS.

The group initially developed performances and interventions connected to rave and techno culture. In 1996, etoy carried out digital hijack, an internet art project that manipulated the results of early search engines including Lycos, AltaVista and Infoseek. Searches for selected popular terms led users to pages informing them that they had been "hijacked". The project received the Golden Nica in the World Wide Web category of the Prix Ars Electronica that year.

Beginning in 1998, etoy sold etoy.SHARES to investors and supporters as part of its corporate art model. Contemporary reporting described shareholders as receiving voting rights concerning future projects.

In 1999, the group's use of the etoy.com domain led to a legal dispute with the online toy retailer eToys.com. etoy subsequently turned the conflict into the online project Toywar, which attracted international media attention and support from internet activists. The dispute ended in January 2000 when eToys withdrew its lawsuit. The conflict is discussed in greater detail below.

== Toywar ==
In 1999, the online toy retailer eToys.com sued etoy over the artists' use of the domain name etoy.com, alleging trademark infringement, trademark dilution and unfair competition. etoy had used the domain since 1995, before eToys launched its website at etoys.com in 1997.

On 29 November 1999, a Los Angeles Superior Court judge granted eToys a preliminary injunction preventing etoy from using the etoy.com address. The order threatened the artists with fines of up to $10,000 per day if they continued to use the domain. etoy subsequently operated from an alternative Internet address while appealing the injunction.

The dispute prompted an Internet-based protest campaign. Supporters created protest and parody websites, called for a boycott of eToys and sent email messages to the company's executives. etoy developed the dispute into Toywar, an online campaign that included a participatory game in which supporters were assigned identities as "toy troops". The Art Newspaper later reported that about 1,400 "toy troops" had been recruited.

In late December 1999, eToys offered to end its legal action after receiving emails and letters from members of the arts and Internet communities urging the company to find a way to coexist with etoy. The initial proposal did not immediately resolve the dispute.

On 25 January 2000, the two sides reached an agreement. eToys agreed to drop its lawsuit and pay up to $40,000 of etoy's legal fees and expenses, while etoy dropped its counterclaim. Both claims were dismissed without prejudice. eToys also took steps to have the block on etoy.com removed, allowing the artists to resume use of the domain.

== Artistic practice and projects ==
=== Corporate structure, shares and value systems ===
Beginning in 1998, etoy sold etoy.SHARES to investors and supporters. The Art Newspaper reported in 2000 that shareholders received voting power over future projects.

In 2001, etoy presented etoy.VALUE-SYSTEM in the exhibition Credit Game at the NTT InterCommunication Center in Tokyo.

In 2006, etoy.CORPORATION SA was registered in the commercial register of the canton of Zug.

=== etoy.TANKS and etoy.DAY-CARE ===
etoy.TANKS are standard cargo containers converted into mobile studios and exhibition units. In 2000, etoy used a 40-foot tank as living quarters and a mobile studio during an exhibition at Postmasters Gallery in New York.

An etoy.DAY-CARE camp using two tanks was presented at BIG Torino in 2002. A second version of the project was presented at the Nieuwe Domeinen arts and architecture festival in Amsterdam in 2004. It involved 500 children, whose uniforms carried two-dimensional barcodes linking to individual web pages.

=== MISSION ETERNITY ===
MISSION ETERNITY was launched in 2005 as a long-term project dealing with death, memory and digital archives.

At ISEA 2006 in San Jose, etoy presented the MISSION ETERNITY SARCOPHAGUS, a modified 20-foot cargo container fitted with an installation of 17,000 LED lights and linked to digital portraits known as ARCANUM CAPSULES.

In 2007, some of Timothy Leary's cremated remains were incorporated into the SARCOPHAGUS.

Anthropologist Maja Petrović-Šteger has examined the project in relation to changing practices of mourning and memorialization, particularly the ways in which digital technologies can alter conventional ways of dealing with the dead.

== Exhibitions and collections ==
In 2002, Kunsthalle St. Gallen presented Frequently Asked Questions, etoy's first comprehensive solo exhibition in Europe. The following year, etoy participated in Hardcore: Towards a New Activism at the Palais de Tokyo in Paris.

MISSION ETERNITY was shown at Manifesta 7 in Bolzano in 2008 and in Synthetic Times: Media Art China 2008 at the National Art Museum of China in Beijing.

Kunsthalle Gwangju opened in 2010 with Leaving Reality Behind..., an exhibition of etoy's work. Kunsthaus Zug followed in 2011 with Domizil Zug: Potthof zu etoy.CORPORATION.

In 2016, HEK in Basel acquired hek.history.etoy.com, an interactive archive documenting etoy's projects and performances since 1994. Works by etoy are also held by Kunsthaus Zug.
