= Geert Lovink =

Dutch media theorist and critic of digital culture (born 1959)

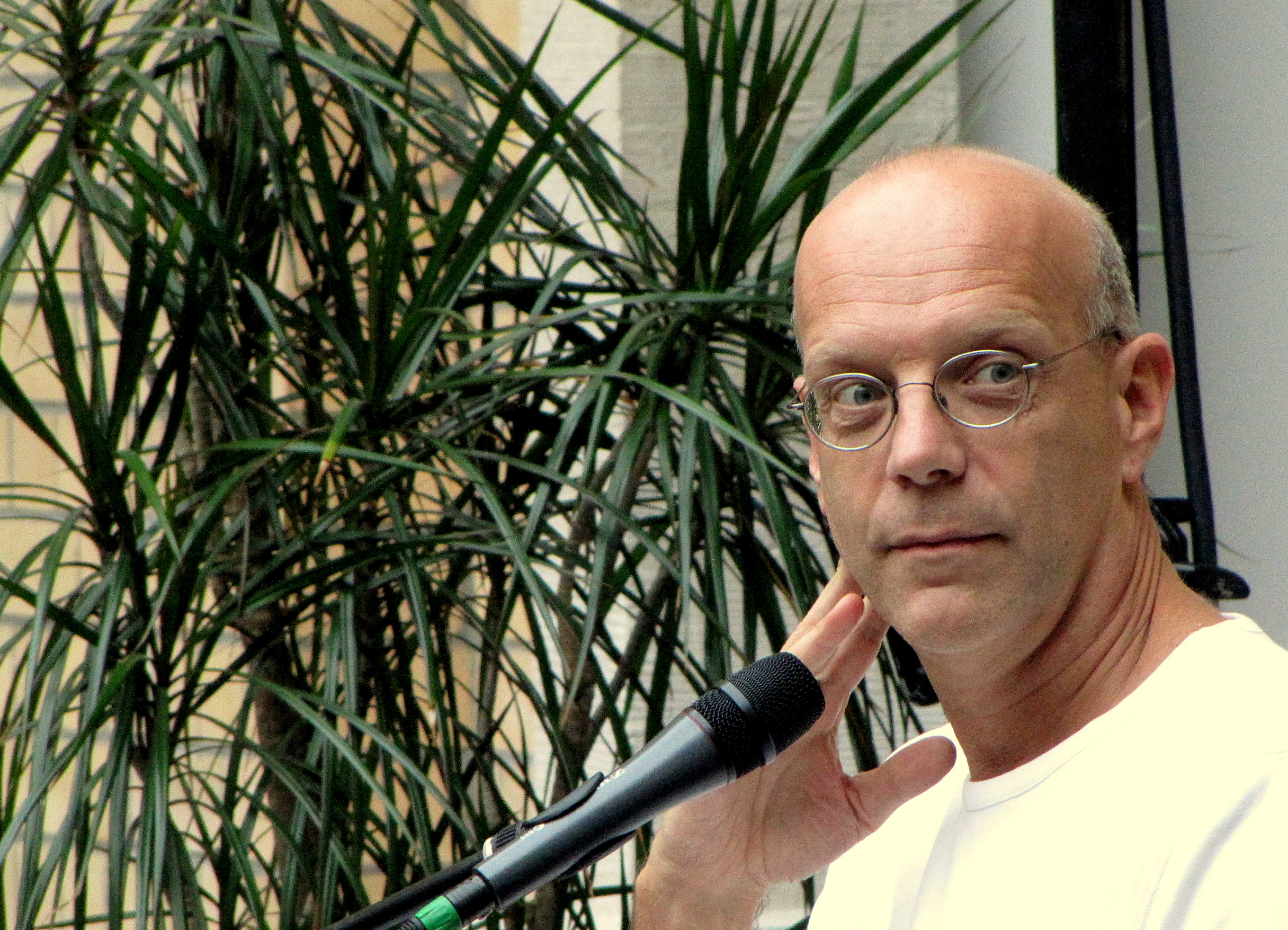
- Geert Lovink in 2010
- Born: August 30, 1959 (age 67); Amsterdam, Netherlands
- Education: University of Amsterdam, University of Melbourne, University of Queensland
- Occupation: Media theorist
- Employer: Hogeschool van Amsterdam
- Website: networkcultures.org networkcultures.org/geert laudanum.net/geert/

Geert Lovink (born 30 August 1959) is a Dutch media theorist and critic of digital culture. He is the founding director of the Institute of Network Cultures (INC), an Amsterdam-based research organization focused on internet studies and digital media.

== Academic career ==
Lovink has held teaching and research positions at several institutions. Since 2004, he has been a researcher with the Faculty of Digital Media and Creative Industries at the Amsterdam University of Applied Sciences, where he also leads the INC. Until 2013, he was associate professor of new media at the University of Amsterdam.

From 2007 to 2017, he taught Media Theory at the European Graduate School, where he supervised PhD students. In December 2021, he was appointed Professor of Art and Network Cultures.

Lovink has a Masters Degree in Political Science from the University of Amsterdam, a PhD from the University of Melbourne, and was a postdoctoral fellow at the University of Queensland.

== Activity ==
Since the early 1980s, Lovink has been involved in projects linking media, art, and technology.

=== 2000s ===
Lovnik organised the Tulipomania Dotcom conference on internet culture in 2000; co-organized Dark Markets, a conference in Vienna on media, democracy, and crisis in 2002; co-organised Uncertain States of Reportage in Delhi in 2003; and co-organised with Trebor Scholz Free Cooperation, a conference on online collaboration at SUNY Buffalo in 2004.

=== 2010s ===
In May 2010, Lovnik took part in Quit Facebook Day, deleting his account as part of a protest against the platform’s practices.

=== 2020s ===
In 2020, the Institute of Network Cultures published two archival collections of Lovink's work: the Adilkno/Bilwet archive and the text archive of his website geertlovink.org.

== Theoretical work ==
Lovink’s research includes contributions to theories of tactical media, described as the use of media technologies to combine artistic practice and critical theory. He has referred to tactical media as “a deliberately slippery term, a tool for creating 'temporary consensus zones' based on unexpected alliances.”

== Selected works ==
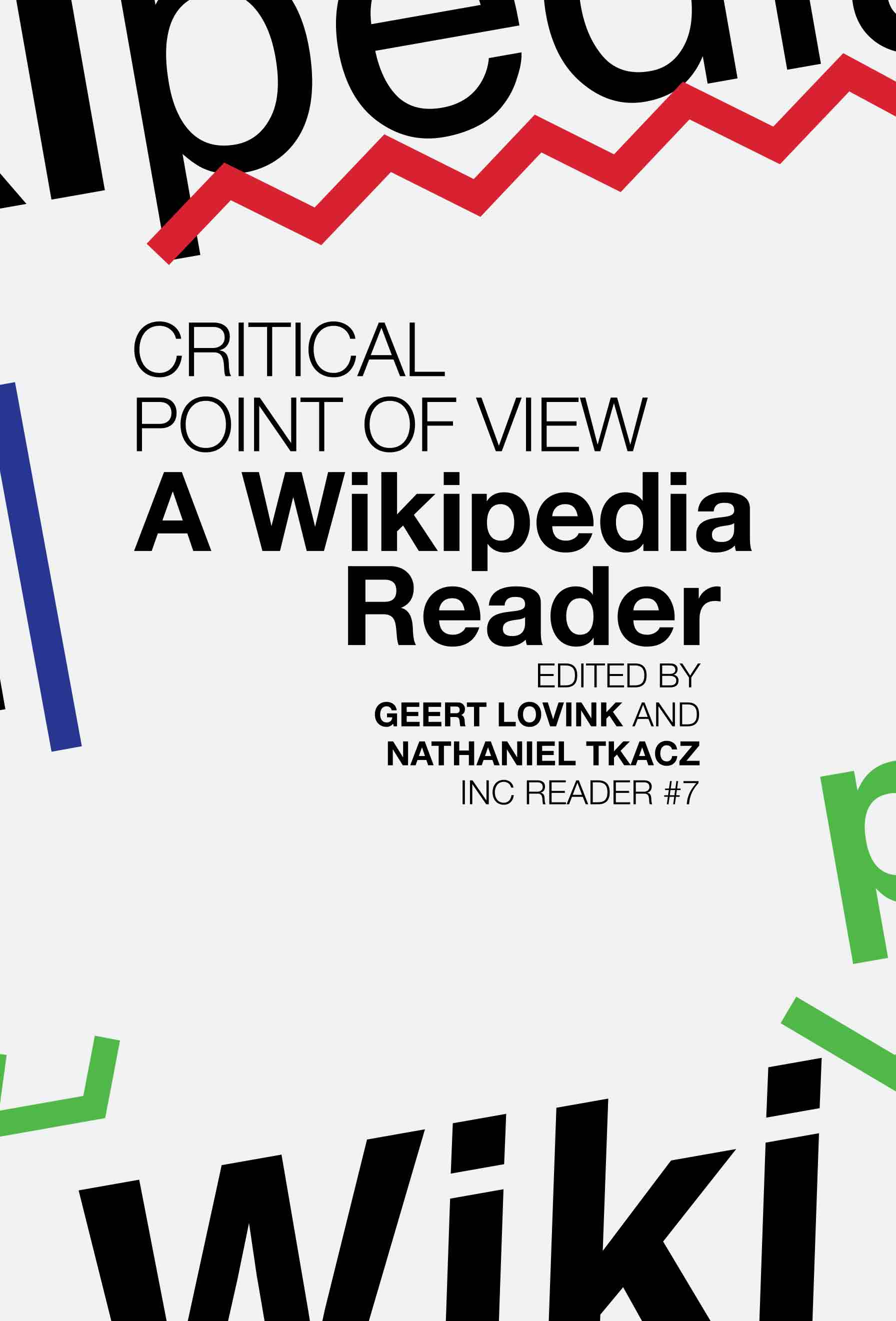
The cover of Critical Point of View: A Wikipedia Reader (2011), edited by Lovink and published by the Institute of Network Cultures

Lovink is the author or editor of numerous publications on media theory and internet culture, including:

- Dynamics of Critical Internet Culture (1994–2001) (PhD thesis, University of Melbourne, 2002)
- Dark Fiber: Tracking Critical Internet Culture (MIT Press, 2002)
- Uncanny Networks (MIT Press, 2002)
- My First Recession (NAi/V2_Publishing, 2003)
- The Principle of Notworking (Amsterdam University Press, 2005)
- Tactical Media, the Second Decade (Submidialogia, 2005)
- Zero Comments: Blogging and Critical Internet Culture (Routledge, 2007)
- Networks Without a Cause: A Critique of Social Media (Polity, 2012)
- Unlike Us Reader: Social Media Monopolies and Their Alternatives (co-editor, Institute of Network Cultures, 2013)
- Social Media Abyss: Critical Internet Cultures and the Force of Negation (Polity, 2016)
- MoneyLab Reader (co-editor, Institute of Network Cultures, 2015; second volume 2017)
- Organization after Social Media (with Ned Rossiter, Minor Compositions, 2018)
- Sad by Design: On Platform Nihilism (Pluto Press, 2019)
- Stuck on the Platform: Reclaiming the Internet (Valiz, 2022)
- Extinction Internet (inaugural lecture, University of Amsterdam, 2022)
