= Tactical media =

Form of media activism

Tactical media is a term coined in 1996, to denote a form of media activism that privileges temporary interventions in the media sphere over the creation of permanent and alternative media outlets.

== Examples ==
Tactical media projects are often a mix between art and activism, which explains why many of its roots can be traced to various art movements. It has been suggested by tactical media theorist Geert Lovink that "discourse plus art equals spectacle", reflecting its striking and memorable nature. Although there are no strict mediums through which it operates, tactical media can often have very high aesthetic value, adding to its "spectacle" and reinforcing some of its artistic roots.

=== GWbush.com ===
In 1998, computer programmer and political activist Zack Exley purchased a domain and created a website titled GWbush.com. He invited the group RTMark (pronounced Art Mark) to build a copy of George W. Bush's official website, as they had done for some corporate websites.

Later, Zack Exley changed the website to be a more mainstream satire (drawing criticism from RTMark), posting a fake press release from the Bush campaign announcing a promise to "pardon all drug prisoners as long as they've learned from their past mistakes". In the midst of Bush's campaign for office, the website not only received millions of hits, but also received coverage from such organizations as ABC News, USA Today and Newsweek. This phenomenon can be classified as tactical media because of its conformance to its corresponding criteria.

=== Tactical air force ===
In 2000, Mexico's Zapatista Army of National Liberation social movement decided to launch a "tactical air force". The Zapatistas' air force consisted of hundreds of paper airplanes. After throwing the planes over the fence of a federal barrack, confused troops were quick to point their rifles at the paper intruders, creating an image that conveyed a very strong message of peace versus war—the target ultimately being the government.

== Comparisons ==
It has often been compared to culture jamming, as both use many of the same techniques in an attempt to occupy the public space controlled by mass media. Where the two practices differ is in their way to obtain this public space; while culture jamming consists of a response to the dominant practices within it, tactical media uses the dominant practices in order to penetrate it and become part of it. Tactical media has also been compared to alternative media. It differs from the latter by its manner in dealing with mass media where alternative media does not seek to infiltrate the dominant by a quick tactic; it attempts to oppose it by proposing what its name suggests: an alternative to the dominant.

Tactical media is the opposite of "strategic media," which is it is power or media influence coming from a "higher" entity to control those with less power.

== Organizations ==
- Critical Art Ensemble
- Institute for Applied Autonomy
- RTMark
- subRosa
- Telestreet
- The Yes Men
- Mídia Tática Brasil

== See also ==
- Trolling
- Fake news website

== Sources ==
- Lovink, Geert (11 August 2003). Dark Fiber: Tracking Critical Internet Culture. The MIT Press. ISBN 978-0-262-62180-9.
- Meikle, Graham (2002). Future Active: Media Activism and the Internet. Pluto Press. ISBN 1-86403-148-4. OCLC 50165391.
