= OpenCity =

Free and open-source city building game

- Official logo

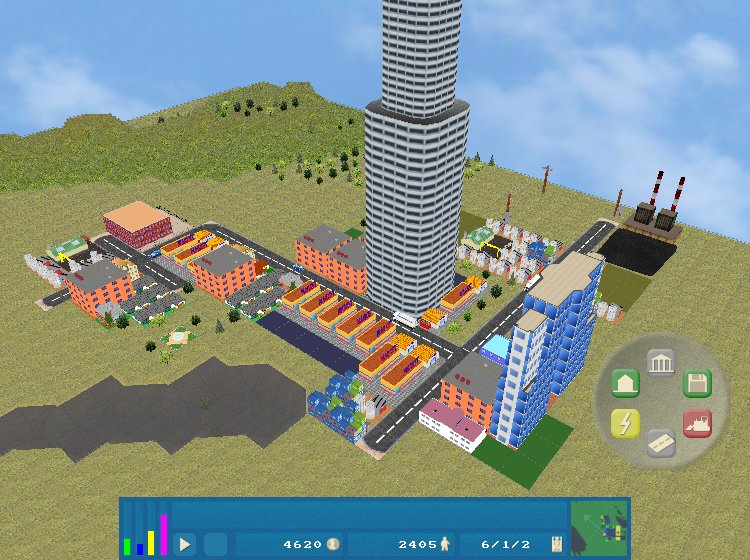
- Screenshot of OpenCity 0.0.5
- Developer: Duong-Khang Nguyen
- Initial release: October 22, 2009; 16 years ago
- Final release: 0.0.6.5 / 2015; 11 years ago
- Written in: C++: SDL, OpenGL
- Platform: Cross-platform
- Type: Single-player city-building
- License: GPLv2
- Website: www.opencity.info
- Repository: sourceforge.net/p/opencity/code/HEAD/tree/

OpenCity is a discontinued 3D city-building game started in 2003 by France-based Vietnamese programmer Duong-Khang Nguyen. The game mechanics are similar to SimCity, although the game developers do not strive to make it a direct SimCity video game clone. It is free and open-source software which is licensed with the GNU General Public License version 2 (GPLv2).

== Gameplay ==
In the game, the player builds a city by marking land as commercial, industrial or residential zones. Those zones depend on each other to grow. The player also must supply the city with power and connect the different zones by building roads.

== Origins, development ==
OpenCity screenshots

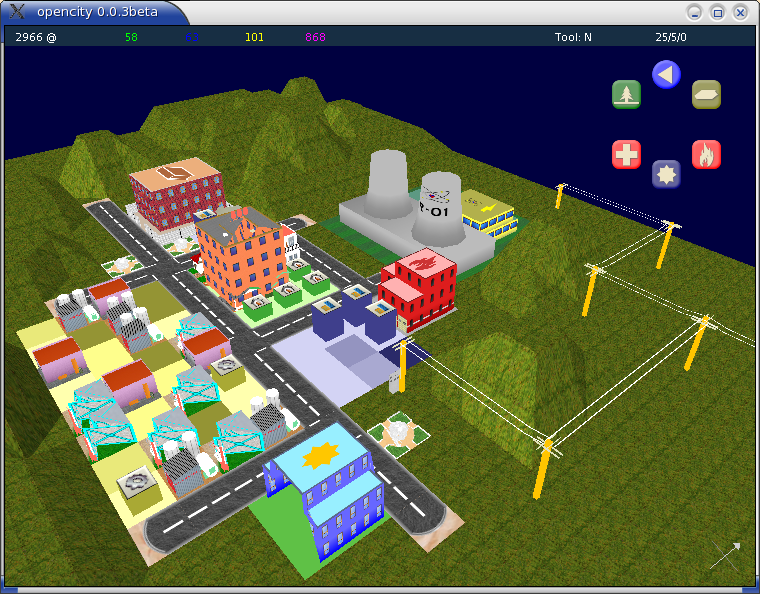
Version 0.0.3

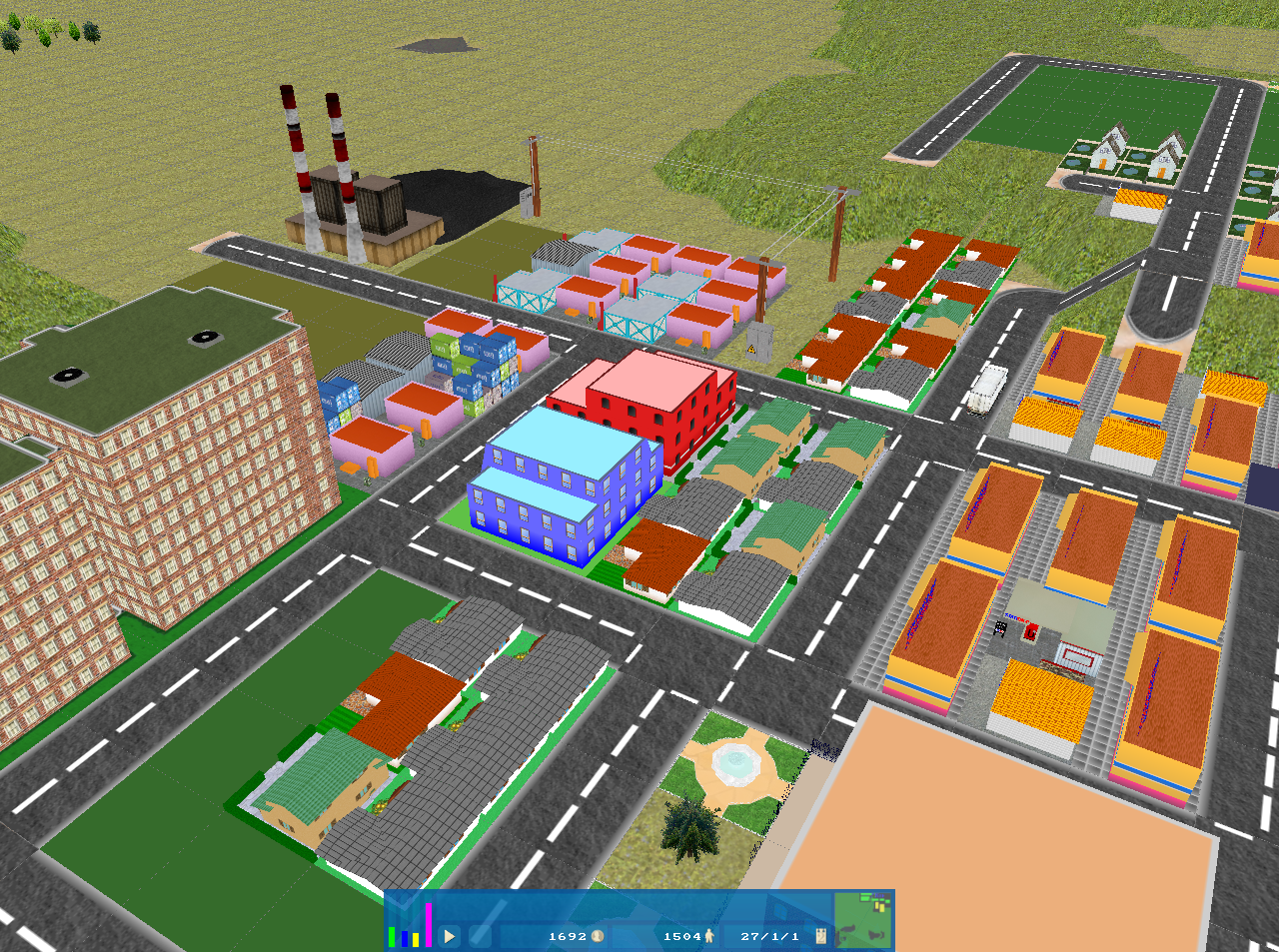
Version 0.0.5

OpenCity is the product of programmer Duong-Khang Nguyen and 3D artist Frédéric Rodrigo. Nguyen was inspired by the open source game FreeReign; when he realized that the FreeReign project was cancelled and the source code was not in condition to be improved, he began developing his own city-building simulator. The work on the project began in 2003 with the registration on SourceForge. Contributions to the game came from the game's community in form of translation and quality testing. OpenCity is built on cross platform libraries and application programming interfaces (APIs) like Simple DirectMedia Library and OpenGL, which allows porting to various operating systems (OSes) and platforms, like Windows, macOS, and many Linux distributions.

== Reception ==
OpenCity achieved a broad spread as free and open-source and freeware video game, and was downloaded directly from SourceForge between 2003 and May 2017 over 190,000 times according to the SF download statistic. OpenCity has also been packaged for many Linux distributions: Fedora Linux, Debian, SuSE, Slackware, Ubuntu, Pardus, Frugalware Linux. OpenCity was reviewed as "well made 3D remake" of SimCity by Chip.de in 2013.

== See also ==
- List of open source games
- Lincity
- SimCity
- Simutrans
