= SimCity Creator (Nintendo DS) =

2008 video game

- North American box art
- Developer: AKI Corporation
- Publisher: Electronic Arts
- Series: SimCity
- Platform: Nintendo DS
- Release: JP: March 19, 2008; EU: September 19, 2008; NA: September 22, 2008; AU: September 25, 2008
- Genre: City-building
- Mode: Single-player

SimCity Creator is a city-building game for the Nintendo DS video game console. It was released in the Western world in September 2008, alongside its Wii counterpart. In Japan it was released several months ahead on March 19, 2008, as a sequel to SimCity DS under the name SimCity DS 2: Kodai kara Mirai e Tsuduku Machi (シムシティDS2 〜古代から未来へ続くまち〜, ShimuShiti DS 2 〜Kodai kara Mirai e Tsuduku Machi〜; lit. "SimCity 2: The City that Continues from Ancient Times to the Future”). (Note: The name is commonly known as SimCity DS 2)

== Gameplay ==
Building on the traditional SimCity formula, SimCity DS 2 offers a new Challenge Mode that sees players guide their city through different historical periods, always starting at the Dawn of Civilization stage, before the player can choose to deviate along a European Oriental city, a Feudal Japanese city, or American style city. Because of this, it is now possible to create cities with a historical theme. For instance, the player can create a Renaissance themed city, a pre-historic themed city or a futuristic city, and unlock famous landmarks as they progress through time that can be built in the open-ended free play mode.

Players are also able to take pictures of their city and share them with friends through Local Wireless.

== Eras ==
The game consists of eight different time periods, most of which are options amongst other eras in their own respective sub-categories.

=== Ancient ===
The ancient era consists of one time period; the Dawn of Civilization, and depicts the very beginning of civilization.

Dawn of Civilization – The first time period the player can access. The player is introduced to a pre-200 population town and 500 logs (Logs in this era have the same role as currency does in other eras and SimCity titles), in which food sources take the role of electricity. The town is placed next to animal hunting grounds which are required for growth until farms are unlocked. Only residential areas and animal paths (With the latter representing roads) can be built at the very beginning, however commercial zones, public squares, Farms and several different landmarks are unlocked throughout the progression of the period. Halfway through the period, a foundation is placed somewhere on the map which is chosen by the player, and as the population increases a large building gradually develops on the foundation. The player must achieve a population of 5,000 to advance to the next era. When the population is met, the Tower of Babel is built on the foundation.

=== Medieval ===
The Medieval era consists of two time periods, most likely depicting the Dark Ages. The player must select one of the two. Once one has been selected, the player can only select the other one by starting another save file and going through the Ancient era again. In this era, the player unlocks Police and Fire Stations, Schools and Hospitals which are required to effectively grow the city, and Landscaping is enabled as well as the ability to build bridges. Landfills, Prisons, Post offices, Seaports and Industrial zones are unlocked in this era, as well as exclusive castles. Money also replaces wood in this era. Both time periods are completed by raising the population by 20,000.

European Renaissance – Takes place in an unknown country of Europe in the 1400s (1480~1520). Many of the buildings here are gothic, while others are simple stone structures. Farms also appear as orchards in this particular time period. The city is also built on grass rather than the sand of the previous time period. In this time period, the university can be unlocked, which can't be unlocked in Open Asia. The symbol of the age is the Notre Dame Cathedral.

Open Asia – Takes place in an unknown country of Asia; most likely China or Japan, in the 1800s (1830~1870). The buildings are of a very Chinese and Japanese architecture, and generally the citizens highly regard peace. The sims on the sims sheet wear kimono as headwear, which is not seen in any other time period. The symbol of the age is the Five Storied Pagoda.

=== Modern ===
The Modern era consists of three time periods. In this era, Food is not required for city expansion and is replaced with the need for electricity. Immediately after the era is started, the player must build coal power plants (Oil power is later unlocked in 2 of the three time periods) and link them to all the zones using power lines. Unpowered zones become abandoned after a certain period of time and unpowered buildings don't operate. The player unlocks water towers, mid-density zones, railroads, parks and universities (If it hasn't yet been unlocked in the previous era). In this era, the player encounters three quizzes that can help the progression in the time period. To complete this era, the population must be raised by about 40,000, though the progression is represented as "the approval rate". The higher the quality of life, the less the population must be raised to complete the era.

European Industrial – Similar to European Renaissance, but taller, better buildings can be used. Takes place in the industrial revolution (1850~1900) in some country of Europe, most likely France. Much of European Renaissance's architecture is preserved in this time period. The symbol of the age of this time period is the "Luminous Tower" (Eiffel Tower).

Asia Development – Contains architecture that varies between eastern and western styles. Takes place in post-war Japan in the 1950s (1950~1989), where the population is recovering from World War II. In this time period, the player can unlock the airport, which cannot be unlocked in the other 2 time periods. The symbol of the age is the Oriental Pearl Tower.

American Prosperity – Features wild west architecture, with many wood houses and shacks, while the larger buildings are made of stone. Takes place during the big immigration in the late 19th century (1870~1930). In this time period the player can pay to have sims immigrate to the city, thus increasing development. This is the only time period in this era where the player cannot unlock the Oil Power Plant. The symbol of the age is the Empire State Building.

=== Present ===
The present era features the largest number of unlockable buildings. The player has immediate access to buildings that were not unlocked in the previous era, as well as bus terminals, high-density zones, oil plants, incinerators, airports, a courthouse, and others. Through progression, the player unlocks pump plants, marinas, and recycling centers. Special buildings that can be unlocked through progression include a theatre of the arts, a casino and a munitions factory. The player has the ability to invest in research funding to unlock advanced buildings and facilities, including wind, nuclear, and geothermal power plants, water treatment plants, energy incinerators, and research labs. If the player has a tree growing in the city, it can be turned into an oil refinery to increase industrial demand and the output of power plants. There are three time periods in this era all taking place in 1997 up to the year 2069 (after 2069 the year will be 20XX or 2070), though the only differences are the symbols of the ages and the soundtracks. To complete the era, the player must increase the population by 500,000.

Global Warming Asia – This time period can only be accessed once Asia Development has been completed. The soundtrack is a mix of punk and jazz. the symbol of the age is the Twin Towers.

Global Warming Europe – This time period can only be accessed once European Industrial has been completed. The soundtrack is heavy metal. The symbol of the age is the Messe Tower.

Global Warming America – This time period can only be accessed once American Prosperity has been completed. The soundtrack is jazz. The symbol of the age is the Gateway Arch.

=== Future ===
This era can be accessed if the player fully pollutes the city, deprives it of all greenery, and keeps the population up until year 2070. In this era, the city is entirely replaced with an ocean, and most buildings can only be built on the ocean rather than the land. The only buildings that are accessible at the beginning are zones, wind power plants, ancient trees and energy lines which serve as roads for aircraft, which replace cars. There is no traffic congestion in this era. The player unlocks general management buildings (police and firefighters in one building), general life buildings (hospitals and schools in one building), ozone power plants, water pumps, and garbage incinerators. The zones in this era are placed in 3X3 panel areas. There is one time period in this era.

Post Global Warming – The buildings are colorful and dynamic in appearance, and have many trees planted on their structure. Takes place in 2080 to 2200 (after 2200, the time will be 21XX) after enough glaciers have melted to flood the player's city. The symbol of the age is the Tree of Life, a giant 4X4 panel tree.

== Characters ==
2 characters which appear in the predecessor of the game (SimCity DS) return in SimCity Creator DS. The main Characters are as follows:

- Maxis – The main character of the game who introduces you to the mayor's office and tells the events of each era in the game, as well as notifying the player of unlocked content. He serves as the player's advisor.
- Professor Sim – Does not appear until the player reaches the modern age and develops high education levels and provides adequate research funding. Professor Sim notifies the player of buildings unlocked via said methods. Many of these buildings are overpowered, such as the Environmental Protection center which permanently exterminates pollution around a large radius. In the Post-Global warming age (The future era), Professor Sim takes over for Maxis as the player's advisor.

== Zones ==
There are three types of zone featured in the game, and Density type (Low, Medium and High) determines the types of buildings that appear within a zone.

- Residential – These zones allow Sims to construct different types of houses, from simple dwellings and huts at the Dawn of Civilization stage to sky-scraping high-rises in the future. The three densities each allow large family homes, multistory apartment buildings or large skyscrapers to be built at best land value.
- Commercial – These zones allow trade centers to be built for Sims or large commercial centers where they can spend Simoleons. The three densities each allow large stores, supermarkets or gigantic shopping malls to be built at best land value.
- Agri-Industrial – These zones allow orchards, rice paddies and pastures to be built to sustain the city's Sim populace. Once the civilization has gone beyond farming, industrial zones are where windmills and small and large factories are constructed. Unlike the other zones, land value is not required for high density buildings.

== Reception ==
Reception

Aggregate score
Aggregator	Score
Metacritic	69/100

Review scores
Publication	Score
1Up.com	B
Famitsu	33/40
GameRevolution	C−
GameSpot	7.5/10
GameSpy	3.5/5
GamesRadar+	3.5/5
GameZone	8.3/10
IGN	6/10
Jeuxvideo.com	14/20
Pocket Gamer	4.5/5
Retro Gamer	75%

The DS version received "average" reviews according to the review aggregation website Metacritic. In Japan, Famitsu gave it a score of 33 out of 40.
