= SimCity DS =

2007 video game

- Developers: EA Japan/EA Partners; AKI Corporation
- Publisher: Electronic Arts
- Series: SimCity
- Platform: Nintendo DS
- Release: JP: February 22, 2007; NA: June 19, 2007; PAL: June 22, 2007
- Genre: City-building
- Modes: Single-player, multiplayer

SimCity DS (シムシティDS, ShimuShiti DS) is a city building and management video game and the first Nintendo DS installment in the SimCity series. It was published by Electronic Arts (EA) and developed by the AKI Corporation and EA Japan.

== Gameplay ==
Screenshot of SimCity DS, displaying a city on the top screen and the city's map at the bottom screen

SimCity DS inherits SimCity 3000's graphics and uses the handheld's dual screens to display additional interfaces. Console-specific features are also prominent, such as the use of the systems' integrated microphone, which is used to blow out fires and the touch screen which is used to control the interface. Before beginning a city, the player must choose a location in the region, one of five advisors and then sign the town charter using the touchscreen and stylus. The upper screen of the DS displays the city and news ticker, while the map, advisor, information and buttons are shown on the touchscreen.

=== Advisors and petitioners ===
SimCity DS features five advisors who help players make proper decisions in the game by providing recommendations and advice. As opposed to previous versions of SimCity, the player must choose only one advisor to help them when they sign the town charter. The different advisors include Julie McSim, Ayako Tachibana, Kaishu Tachibana, Servo 3000 and a secret advisor named Alien.

There are also petitioners, many of which are citizens of the players' cities, that approach the player with problems and request solutions or to modify city policies, such as lowering tax rates, or neighbor deals (old coot offers to take trash for §250 per month, Granny Agnes offers to buy water for §500 a month, both last 5 years). They may also give the player rewards or request certain structures to be erected in the city.

=== News ticker ===
In addition to the advisor, a news ticker scrolls along the bottom of the upper screen, displaying pertinent information about the city in the form of news stories, such as indicating that the city needs improvements in certain areas, or how well a particular city department is functioning. Generally, when things were going very well in a city, the news ticker displays headlines which are comical, or even nonsensical and often seemingly useless to the player.

=== Disasters ===
The game features a number of disasters which the game can inflict upon a city, including earthquakes, fires, giant ape attacks, and UFO attacks.

The game also features a "Save the City" mode in which the player must help one of several cities recover from a disaster and reach a specific target (within the 10-year time limit) to succeed. The player will fail instantly if the city's funds drop to §0.

=== Research ===
There are a number of buildings that can only be obtained by spending money on research (found toward the bottom of your exp. budget sheet). Each building grants certain benefits to the city. They require both water and power to function. Research takes both time and funding. For example, even if you devote 200% funding to research you will still not obtain a nuclear power plant if the year is 1909.

=== Zones ===
As with other SimCity games, the player sets zone types, either residential, commercial, industrial, seaport, or airport. Each of these zone types, except for the airport and seaport, can be built in light, medium, and dense varieties. The zoning colors are different from other SimCity games residential is yellow instead of green, commercial is purple instead of blue, and industrial is red or orange instead of yellow.

== Reception ==
Reception

Aggregate score
Aggregator	Score
Metacritic	69/100

Review scores
Publication	Score
Electronic Gaming Monthly	6.33/10
Eurogamer	6/10
Famitsu	31/40
Game Informer	8.25/10
GameSpot	7/10
GameSpy	2.5/5
IGN	7/10
Nintendo Power	8/10
Pocket Gamer	3/5
VideoGamer.com	8/10
411Mania	8.5/10

The game received "average" reviews according to the review aggregation website Metacritic. In Japan, Famitsu gave it a score of 31 out of 40.

== Sequel ==
AKI Corporation went on to develop a Nintendo DS version of SimCity Creator that is treated as an official sequel to SimCity DS in Japan. It was first released there as SimCity DS 2 in March 2008, several months before it was released in the rest of the world along with its Wii counterpart.
