= End zone (disambiguation) =

End zone is the scoring area in gridiron football

It may also refer to:

- End Zone, a novel
- Endzone: A World Apart, a video game
- Keith "End Zone" Jones (born 1966), an American football player
- NFL End Zone, a British television program on Channel 5
