= Lincity =

2004 open-source video game

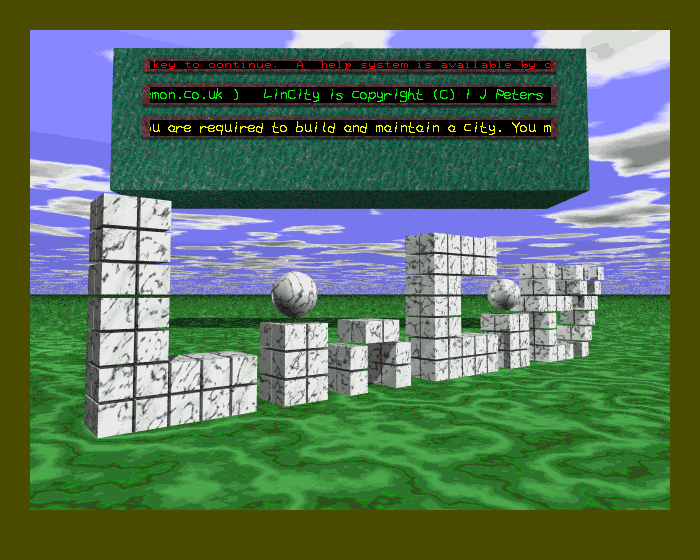
- Original author: I. J. Peters
- Release: 1995 (31 years ago)
- Stable release: 2.15.0 / 8 May 2026 (6 months ago)
- Platform: Cross-platform
- Successor: LinCity-NG
- Type: Single-player City-building
- License: GPLv2
- Website: github.com/lincity-ng/lincity-ng
- Repository: sourceforge.net/projects/lincity/

Lincity is a free and open-source construction and management simulation game, which puts the player in control of managing a city's socio-economy, similar in concept to SimCity. The player can develop a city by buying appropriate buildings, services and infrastructure. Its name is both a Linux reference and a play on the title of the original city-building game, SimCity, and it was released under the GNU General Public License v2.

Its name is a portmanteau of linux and city (or simcity)

== Gameplay ==
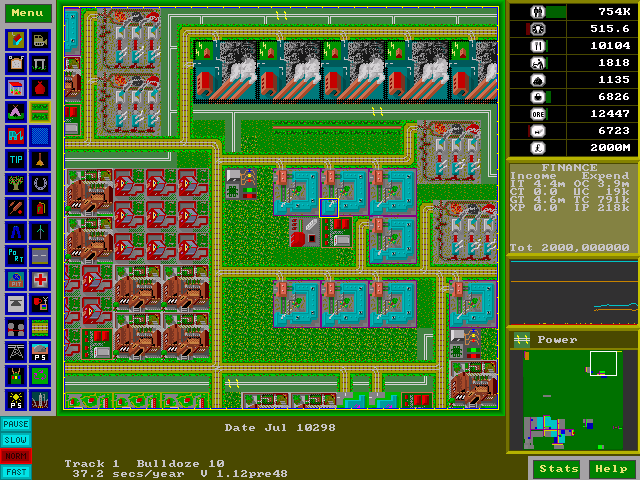
A screenshot of the original Lincity, showing the top-down gameplay

Lincity features complex 2D and top-down gameplay.

The simulation considers population, employment, basic water management and ecology, goods (availability and production), raw materials (ore, steel, coal), services (education, health, fire protection, leisures), energy (electricity and charcoal, coal with finite reserves, solar and wind power) and other constraints such as finance, pollution and transports. The player has to take care of population growth and various socio-economic balances.

Lincity can be won in two ways: sustainable economy, or evacuation. The Lincity homepage has a Hall of Fame, listing players who have succeeded in one of these two goals.

== History ==
Lincity was created around 1995 as SimCity clone for Linux by I. J. Peters and hosted on SourceForge in 2001. Lincity was originally designed for Linux, but was ported later to Microsoft Windows, BeOS, OS/2, AmigaOS 4, and other operating systems. Mac OS X is supported when compiled from source code using GCC and run using X11.app. It uses SVGALib or X11 as its graphics interface API on Unix systems. As Lincity does software rendering it requires no 3D graphics card and also has very low demands on other computing resources, e.g. much memory or a fast processor. Since 1999 there have been only minor changes to Lincity; the last update was in August 2004.

== Critical reception ==
In 2000, a CNN article on Linux games highlighted Lincity's sophistication. It was The Linux Game Tome Game of The Month for January 2005. Lincity was 2008 a featured freeware title on 1Up.com. The Washington Post featured Lincity in 2009.

== Successor ==
LinCity-NG
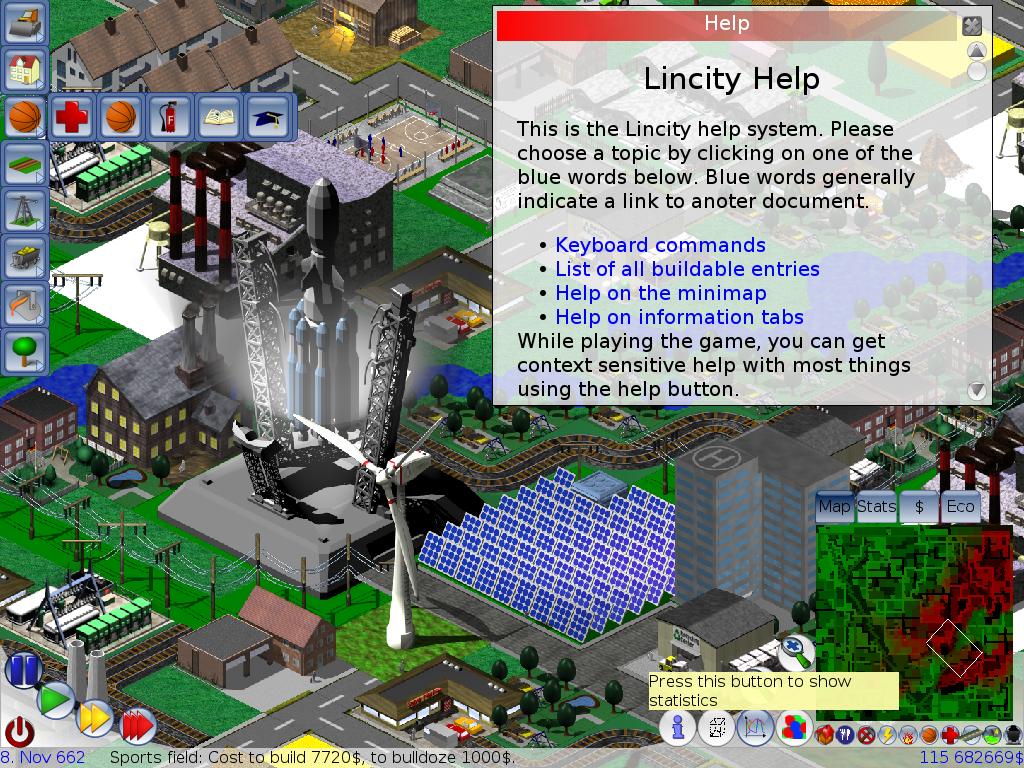
- Stable release: 2.15.0
- License: GPLv2
- Website: https://github.com/lincity-ng/lincity-ng/
- Repository: sourceforge.net/projects/lincity/

In 2005 significant development continued with the fork LinCity-NG, which was later transferred to Google Code and then to GitHub. Lincity-NG uses SDL2 and OpenGL, and features an isometric view, based on SimCity 3000, and graphics that resemble SimCity 3000's.

== See also ==
- List of open source games
- Simutrans
- OpenTTD
- OpenCity
- Micropolis
