= Aven Colony =

2017 video game

- Developer: Mothership Entertainment
- Publisher: Team17
- Composer: Alexander Brandon
- Engine: Unreal Engine 4
- Platforms: Microsoft Windows, PlayStation 4, Xbox One
- Release: July 25, 2017
- Genres: City-building, strategy
- Mode: Single-player

Aven Colony is a city-building strategy video game developed by Mothership Entertainment and published by Team17. The Beta was released on September 8, 2016 on Microsoft Windows. The main storyline revolves around the human colonisation of an alien planet, in which a new colony must be built in order to survive.

== Gameplay ==
Aven Colony involves building a new human city on Aven Prime, an alien planet light-years away from Earth. The player oversees construction, resources, and people within the colony. The colony must be built from scratch and over time additional colonists will arrive. There are many different buildings, ranging from tent-like buildings to skyscrapers and a space elevator. These buildings serve many purposes including oxygen creation, living quarters, food cultivation, resource mining, protection of the colony, exploration and expansion. Flying drones are used to build, upgrade, recycle and manage everything in the colony. The colonists themselves travel around walking or in Hover cars. There is a day and night-cycle, and during the night cycle everything freezes over so food will not grow and solar panels work at 50%. The colony must also cope with various environmental conditions including storms, dust devils, toxic gas and shard storms. There is an alien called "the creep" which grows over buildings covering them in its tentacles; however, drones can be built to remove "the creep". There are other alien threats that may attack a colony including plague spores, hovering guardians and cultist airships, these attacks can be defended against through building defensive structures to protect the colony. Research can be carried out to improve the crops that can be grown, and there are over a dozen different types of crop. There is a morale system which can be influenced by several different factors including food, living conditions, employment, crime and social policies set by the player. Regular elections are held in which the citizens can sack the player if morale gets too low. Ancient alien artefacts can be discovered and used as the colony expands. Sub-colonies can be built in the area surrounding the main colony, there are four different types of sub-colony.

To control all of this there are twelve different menus which give the player information about the colony. These menus include details on citizens, employment, commute, happiness, crime, resources, electricity, water, air, crops, structures and drones. The game speed can be adjusted up to eight times normal speed and paused at any time. There are three different camera modes each giving a different view of the colony and surrounding area, these modes include: surveillance camera mode, satellite camera mode and an overworld map.

There are two main game modes. Campaign Mode includes many missions to complete, and within each mission there are objectives that the player must meet in order to complete the mission. In Sandbox Mode, initial conditions can be set, then a colony can be built on an open-ended world with no specific objectives.

== Development ==
Aven Colony was in development for two and a half years. The beta was published on 8 September 2016 on Itch.io and the full version of the game was released for download on 25 July 2017 on Steam, Itch.io, Xbox One and PlayStation 4. A physical boxed version was available from 1 August 2017.

Since the release of the game there have been multiple small updates adding new features, improving performance and fixing bugs. The first major update was published for PC on 31 August 2017, and was labelled as "Content drop one". This update added 11 new buildings including; a space elevator, a decontamination unit and new decorative buildings. This update also has a new sandbox map called "Serpent Isle" and a new transport system using Hover cars. This content drop was released for PlayStation 4 and Xbox One on the 19 December 2017.

The second major update for the game was released for PC on 5 December 2017. This update was labelled as "Content drop two: The Expedition Update". This update mainly focuses on the enabling the expansion of your colony to sub-colonies around the world. As such the new features include 4 different types of remote settlement, a new building for remote settlements called "The colony terminal", Ark vessels which are used to build remote settlements, a new two-tier Expedition centre, and an upgraded combat ship. There are multiple improvements to the camera modes which allow an easier transition between different modes, and a new satellite camera mode has been added. The overworld map view has been improved and now shows incoming threats before they reach the colony. "The Cult of the Seterdari" are a new enemy which may attack a colony using their airships. This update also includes improvements to the appearance of water as well as multiple bug fixes.

== Reception ==
Reception

Aggregate score
Aggregator	Score
Metacritic	PC: 65/100; PS4: 73/100; XONE: 77/100

Review scores
Publication	Score
Destructoid	6/10
Polygon	5/10
Push Square	7/10

The game has a Metacritic score of 73 out of 100. Polygon gave the game, a 5 out of 10.

== See also ==
- Planetbase
- Surviving Mars
- SimCity
