= City Tales: Medieval Era =

Upcoming video game

City Tales - Medieval Era
- Developer: Irregular Shapes
- Publisher: Firesquid
- Engine: Unity
- Platform: Windows
- Release: 22 May 2025 (early access)
- Genres: City-building, construction and management simulation
- Mode: Single-player

City Tales - Medieval Era is a medieval city-building game that allows players to shape vast cities beyond a traditional grid layout. The game emphasizes organic building systems and detailed mechanics. Players can manage resources, plan districts for their citizens' needs, and assist companions in their tales, creating a thriving medieval realm filled with life and hope.

The game was launched in early access on May 22, 2025. It is developed by a small French team, named IrregularShapes.
