= Dawn of Man =

2019 video game

- Developer: Madruga Works
- Publisher: Madruga Works
- Platforms: Windows, macOS, PlayStation 4, Xbox One
- Release: Windows, macOS; WW: March 1, 2019; PlayStation 4, Xbox One; WW: December 18, 2019; NA: January 6, 2020 (PS4)
- Genres: City-building, survival
- Mode: Single-player

Dawn of Man is a survival and city-building video game which was developed by Madruga Works. The closed beta started the week of October 17, 2018 and the game was released on March 1, 2019.

== Gameplay ==
In Dawn of Man, the player leads a group of prehistoric settlers to form a settlement and ensure their survival from the Paleolithic era until the Iron Age. Settlers must defend from animal attacks, hunt animals, and gather vegetables to eat, which requires the crafting of tools made from wood, bone, or stone. Getting resources, crafting tools and building structures help to advance through a technology tree, allowing more complex tools and ways to make food and structures more durable. Hunting-gathering can be abandoned with the discovery of agriculture and the domestication of animals. Raiders show up in later stages, requiring to build weapons and defense structures.

== Reception ==
Reception

Aggregate score
Aggregator	Score
Metacritic	(PC) 74/100

On the review aggregation website Metacritic, the PC version of the game has an aggregated score of 74/100 based on 9 critic reviews, indicating "mixed or average reviews".

Helen Ashcroft from The Gamer gave the game 4 out of 5 stars. She praised the choosing of a setting which is largely unexplored by city-building games, which are usually set in the present, the future, or the recent past. She also liked that the game menu starts with only a few sections, and others are made available later, allowing the player to get used to them. She also pointed that the game is slow-paced, and may be unsuitable for players used to fast-paced ones. Visuals and animations are detailed, and the soft music is described as relaxing. She also considers that the notifications are too brief and easy to miss, and that sometimes it be useful to manually control the settlers.

== See also ==
- Planetbase
- Banished
