= Simutrans =

Cross-platform transport simulation game

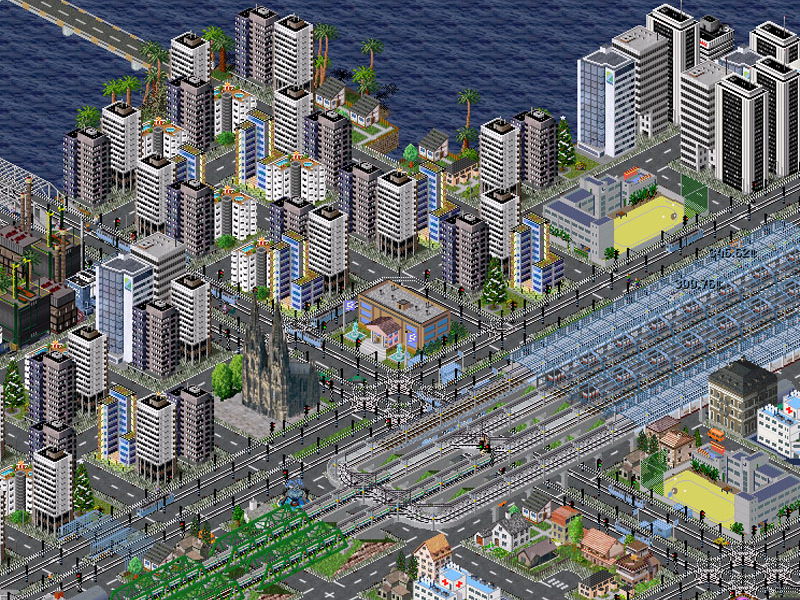
- Simutrans pak64
- Original authors: Hansjörg Malthaner (initial, left in Spring 2005)
- Developers: Markus Pristovsek "Prissi" (current head of development); Simutrans Development Team
- Release: March 6, 1999; 27 years ago
- Stable release: 124.5 / May 31, 2026; 4 months ago
- Written in: C++, Squirrel, C
- Operating system: Multi-platform
- Platform: Cross-platform
- Size: 10~400 MB
- Available in: Multilingual
- Type: Construction and management
- License: Artistic License 1.0
- Website: www.simutrans.com
- Repository: servers.simutrans.org

Simutrans is a cross-platform simulation game in which the player strives to run a successful transport system by constructing and managing transportation systems for passengers, mail and goods by land (rail, road, tram, monorail, maglev), air (airplanes) and water (ship) between places. Like OpenTTD, Simutrans is an open-source transportation game based on the Transport Tycoon idea.

== Development history ==
Simutrans was originally written by Hansjörg Malthaner in 1997. Around 2004 he retired from development, and an international community of volunteers took over the development. Simutrans was developed internally as a closed source game until 2007, when the software was relicensed under the Artistic License 1.0.

Simutrans has been ported to Microsoft Windows, Linux, BeOS/Haiku, Mac OS X, and AmigaOS 4.x, which make use of several graphics libraries such as GDI (Windows only), SDL (all versions) or Allegro (BeOS only). It is portable to any architecture using GCC and one of the aforementioned libraries. Simutrans has multilingual support.

The current stable release of Simutrans is version 124.5 as of May 31, 2026. There is a popular branch of the code called Simutrans-Extended, which aims to extend the basic game. Simutrans-Extended was formerly called Simutrans-Experimental, but changed its name in 2017 to make clear that it is a distinct fork of Simutrans and not a testing branch. Nightly builds for Simutrans and the main PakSets are also released for both standard and Extended versions.

== Overview and features ==
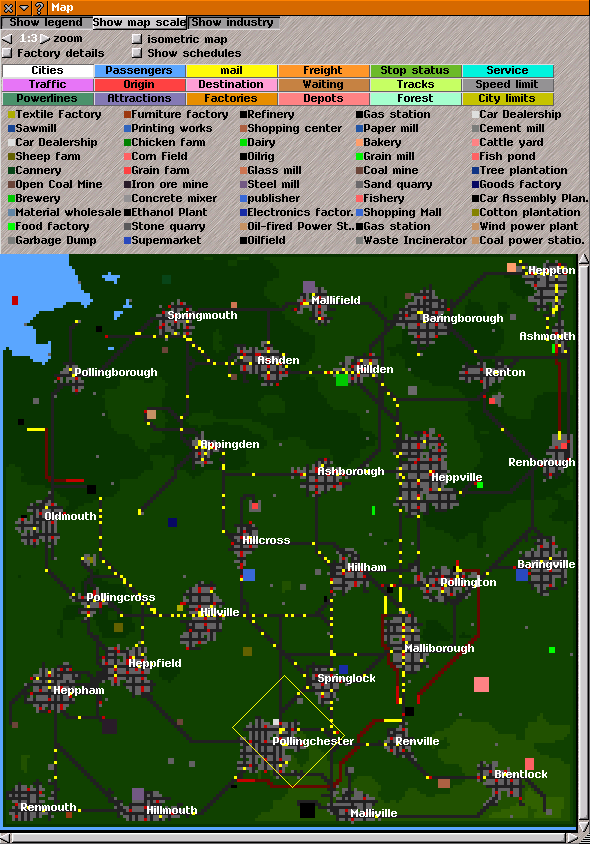
Map of a Simutrans game world, showing cities and factories

The main goal in Simutrans is to provide an efficient transport system for passengers, mail and goods to be transported to their desired destinations fast and with minimal transfers and at the same time making the company grow avoiding bankruptcy or excess administration.

Simutrans has a number of factory chains that are interconnected with other chains, for example, a coal mine produces coal for a coal power plant, and an oil rig produces oil for an oil refinery. The goods produced by these factories may be distributed to smaller factories or shops, such as gasoline to a gas station, coming from a gas storage facility, which retrieves the gas from an oil refinery, and so on.

Supplying a factory with electric power will increase the production and allows for fine-tuning the economy. Passengers and mail are transported between different cities and tourist attractions, and may use several methods of transportation to reach their destinations.

The Simutrans executable can run many different paksets, which is a package containing files called paks. Paks are files with graphic and data files that Simutrans uses to determine the objects in the game, their resolution, appearance, and behavior. Gaming experience is therefore very dependent on the pakset used.

Simutrans currently features 12 AI players, and has an online capability similar to OpenTTD since version 110.0. The terrain in Simutrans is freely-modifiable, and different layers like tunnels and bridges can be stacked, allowing for subways or highways to be constructed. It has a day and night cycle, different climates and seasons. Nearly all modes of transportation exist in Simutrans. At least buses/trucks, trains, and ships are always provided. If defined in the pakset, aircraft, monorails and maglevs can also be used.

Simutrans features an online multiplayer mode. Players can join an online game using the in-game server browser. Simutrans-Extended also features an online mode, including a long-term semi-persistent online server in which the game world typically lasts over a year before being reset.

== Customization ==
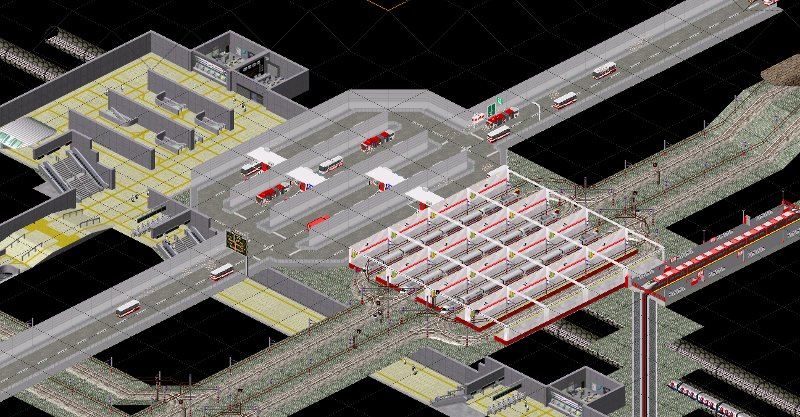
Underground mode (pak128)

The Simutrans executable must load a pakset which contains the game's objects. Over the years several paksets have been created. An overview is given on the official page.

Simutrans can easily be expanded or modified. Simple modification can be done via editing the personal config file. Since the objects in the game just consist of a simple image and a short description file, it is very easy to create a house or add a train. Thus many contributed objects for all graphic sizes exist. The user can also add height maps and citylists which add city names into the game. Even deep modifications of the game mechanics are possible via the config file, like a setting to prevent stockpiling at factories or changing the economic model simulation.

== Critical reception ==
GameDaily's Big Download considered Simutrans to be one of the best freeware games, highlighting the logical system of routing passengers and freight to their destinations, decent AI opponents and the support for custom aesthetics or rules-sets. However, the sometimes unreliable vehicle pathfinding was criticized, particularly with respect to alternate routes and switches for train lines. The sound effects were deemed to be unengaging, and new players may be baffled by the range of transportation possibilities.

Another review from Amiga Future came to very similar conclusions (apart from the lack of sound support on Amiga OS). In particular the depth of simulation and the stability were highlighted.

Between 2007 and June 2017 Simutrans was downloaded from SourceForge over 5.6 million times.

== See also ==
- List of open source games
- OpenTTD
- Transport Tycoon
- RollerCoaster Tycoon
- SimCity
- SimCity 4: Rush Hour
- Lincity
