= Foundation (video game) =

City-building video game by Polymorph Games

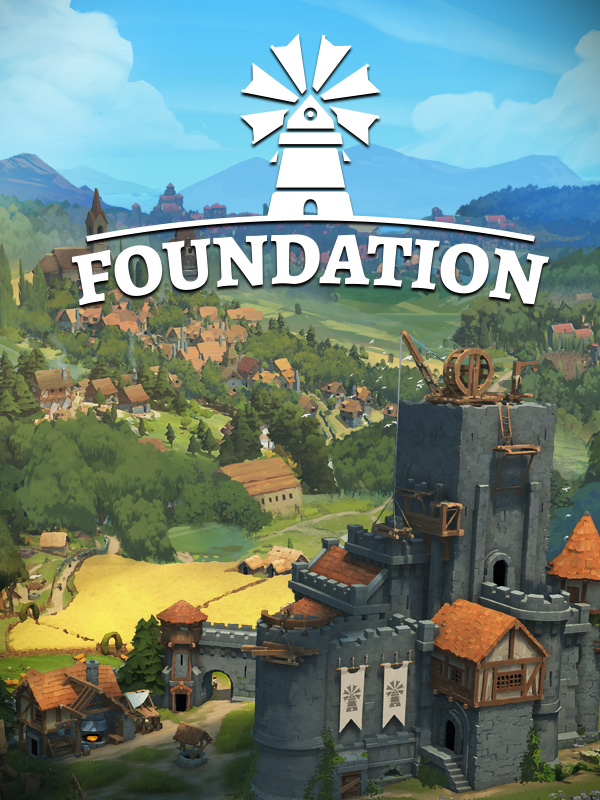
- Foundation Box Art 2025
- Developer: Polymorph Games
- Publisher: Polymorph Games
- Engine: Hurricane
- Platform: Windows
- Release: 31 January 2025
- Genre: City-building
- Mode: Single-player

Foundation is a city-building video game developed and published by Polymorph Games for Windows. It entered open alpha in 2018, launched in early access on 1 February 2019, and was fully released on 31 January 2025.

== Gameplay ==
Gameplay is based on organic urbanism. Players are tasked with constructing a medieval town with the ability to place buildings organically, without a grid system. Players are guided by the book through which various aspects of the game can be controlled, including progress which is unlocked via a series of tiers. Villagers must be assigned a job or role and buildings must be assigned resources. The initial territory can be expanded by purchase. The landscape needs to be painted according to its use. Trade with neighboring villages is part of an economy that needs to be managed.

Playing the game is designed to be a relaxing experience with few limitations on gameplay.

== Development ==
Developer Polymorph Games is based in Quebec City, Canada. The game's development was crowdfunded through a Kickstarter campaign in 2018.

The developers initially planned a one-year early access period.

The game uses the proprietary game engine called Hurricane.

== Reception ==
Reception

Aggregate score
| Aggregator | Score |
|---|---|
| Metacritic | 84/100 |

Foundation received "generally favorable" reviews from critics, according to the review aggregation website Metacritic. Rock Paper Shotgun described the game as "a comfortable experience." Polygon noted the game's "annoying user interface quirks," while also mentioning its relaxing world where challenge is present but not overwhelming. PCGamesN commented positively on the game's road system. The Strategy Informer highlighted "Foundation" for its uniqueness and aesthetic appeal.

As of 2019, the game had sold 200,000 copies.
