= SimCity Creator =

2008 video game

- Developer: Hudson Soft
- Publisher: Electronic Arts
- Series: SimCity
- Platform: Wii
- Release: EU: September 19, 2008; NA: September 22, 2008; JP: September 25, 2008; AU: October 2, 2008
- Genre: City-building game
- Mode: Single player

SimCity Creator (シムシティ クリエイター, ShimuShiti Kurieitā) is a video game in the Sim game series by Electronic Arts. It was released for the Wii in 2008.

== Overview ==
SimCity Creator follows the basic SimCity formula that sees players managing a city and placing residential, commercial, and industrial zones for buildings in addition to facilities such as police stations, hospitals, seaports, and stadiums. Players are also able to customize the look of their buildings by choosing from several themes for the city such as Egyptian, Roman, Japanese, European, Las Vegas, and near-future styles, in addition to ones that result in a crystal or confectionery-like appearance to buildings, along with unique soundtracks to go along with each theme. Players are also able to tour their city, rendered in 3D graphics, in a helicopter or airplane. If the player builds an airport, more touring vehicles can be unlocked. In contrast to the DS title of the same name, players are not able to greatly advance the technology of the city short of the examples above.

Taking advantage of the Wii, the pointer function of the Wii Remote is used to directly draw roads and train tracks onto the map. Players were able to share their cities through WiiConnect24, and the game's advisors were redesigned to resemble MySims characters.

Similar to SimCity 4, SimCity Creator features a day and night cycle, as well as a seasonal cycle last seen in the SNES version of SimCity. Players may tackle disasters including dinosaurs, giant robots, tornadoes, aliens, fires, and meteorite impacts.

== Construction ==
=== Zones ===
In SimCity Creator, areas can be zoned by the type of development and the density. There is also a landfill zone available which allows garbage to be stored. Each zone is color-coded:

- Residential (yellow): Housing for Sims to live in. This zone's buildings include houses for low-density zones and apartment towers and skyscrapers for higher-density zones.
- Commercial (blue): Where stores and office buildings are located. Sims can work in stores and offices, and the commerce can be taxed. Offices are usually built on commercial medium or high density zones. Hotels and restaurants are sometimes built as well.
- Industrial (red): Contains the factories and warehouses. Sims may work here but it lowers land values and pollutes the air.

=== Transportation ===
Zones must be connected by lines of transportation. Some of the types of transportation choices for a city include roads and highways.

Roads and streets are basic lines of transportation that cars, buses and trucks drive on. They can be either curved or straight.

They can lead into each other to form crossroads or roundabouts. Heavy congestion can cause pollution above the affected road.

Highways are 4-lane roads. Cars travel faster on highways than roads or streets. However, they need on-ramps to function.

The player cannot build streets over rivers. However, building a road or railway over a river automatically creates a bridge.

Railways are what trains run on. However, they require train stations to work although they lower traffic congestion.

Subways are underground railways so they do not require buildings to be bulldozed, which makes it a more sensible choice for dense cities. They are more expensive to build than ordinary railways, about 8 in-game currency per tile, however, making it more sensible not to use them to link parts of your city that are far away from each other and do not have buildings in between them.

Subway stations are also smaller than train stations, occupying a 1x1 square rather than a 3x3 square for regular stations.

Subway stations are also easier to link to rails than ordinary railway stations.

Seaports are where boats stay. Seaports increase industrial demand.

Airports are where planes land.

If an airport is built the player will see planes, helicopter, airships and hot air balloons flying above their city, especially near the airport.

Airports also raise commercial demand and enable several flight missions to happen.

== Development ==
The game was first announced on February 12, 2008, by Sims label president Nancy Smith along with other upcoming EA Sim titles including SimAnimals, MySims Kingdom, and MySims Party.

== Reception ==
Reception

Aggregate score
Aggregator	Score
Metacritic	67/100

Review scores
Publication	Score
Famitsu	28/40
Game Informer	5/10
GamesMaster	86%
GameSpot	6/10
GameSpy	3.5/5
GameZone	7/10
IGN	5.9/10
Jeuxvideo.com	15/20
Nintendo Life	5/10
Nintendo Power	6/10

The game received "average" reviews according to the review aggregation website Metacritic. In Japan, Famitsu gave it a score of one seven, one eight, one seven, and one six for a total of 28 out of 40.
