= SimCity 4: Rush Hour =

Expansion pack for SimCity 4

- Developer: Maxis (Note: Ported to Mac OS X by i5works.)
- Publishers: EA Games; Aspyr Media (Mac)
- Producer: Kevin Hogan
- Designers: Joseph Knight; Michael McCormick
- Programmers: Ed Nanale; Paul Pedriana
- Artist: Brian White
- Composer: Jerry Martin
- Series: SimCity
- Platforms: Windows; Mac OS X
- Release: Windows: NA: September 22, 2003; AU: September 25, 2003; EU: September 26, 2003; Mac OS X: NA: September 27, 2004
- Genre: City-building
- Mode: Single player

SimCity 4: Rush Hour is the expansion pack for SimCity 4 created by EA Games and Maxis, where the player builds a city from scratch. It was released in September 2003 simultaneously with a deluxe edition of SimCity 4 which also contains the expansion pack built-in.

In SimCity 4: Rush Hour, players continue to build and manage cities, but now have the ability to control the transportation systems within their cities, including roads, highways, railways, and airports. The expansion pack also introduces disasters, such as tornadoes and earthquakes, which can impact players' cities.

SimCity 4: Rush Hour received generally positive reviews upon release, with many praising the added depth and replay value provided by the new transportation and disaster features.

== Overview ==
=== Mayor Mode ===
When starting a new city, there are three different difficulty levels, each with a different amount of starting money, as opposed to the single amount in the original SimCity 4. New regions are also included, such as New York and San Francisco.

=== Tutorials ===
Instead of a single tutorial, Rush Hour includes five separate tutorials in order to help players learn the controls for the game. It includes a "Getting Started" tutorial that guides the player the basic zoning and construction tools, a "Terraforming" tutorial that instructs the player on the use of the terraforming tools in god mode, a "Making Money" tutorial that helps players learn how to manage their budget, a "Big City" tutorial that shows how to improve the desirability and land value in a large city, and finally a "Rush Hour" tutorial that shows the player how to use all the new tools that were added with the expansion pack.

=== U-Drive-It ===
A steam train being driven by the player using U-Drive-It

U-Drive-It is a new add-on to Rush Hour, a mode where players can take control of cars, planes, boats and many other forms of transportation and drive them around the city. There are two modes of driving: Scenario Mode, where the player has a limited amount of time to complete a mission and win money or prizes, or Free Drive, that allows the player to drive freely.

If the vehicle sustains excessive damage (either by crashing into other vehicles or traversing into water), it will burst into flames and subsequently explode. This is shown by a colored diamond above the vehicle, in-game called a "plumbob" (much like the ones in The Sims) which can turn from green to red to represent the vehicle's current state.

Some vehicles have certain individual features, such as a police siren on police cars or the capacity to damage sections of the city with munitions from vehicles such as tanks, helicopters and jets. Also, some boats may cast fish nets or tug other boats to safety.

GameSpot has related U-Drive-It to Streets of SimCity, and indicated the feature including an enhanced physics model partially based on that of SimCopter. However, while Streets of SimCity and SimCopter can alternate between a first- and third-person view, U-Drive-It is restricted to third-person.

=== Roads and highways ===
A screenshot showing some examples of new features in SimCity 4: Rush Hour

The newest addition to the roads section are one way roads and avenues. One-way roads are the same size as normal roads only they stretch into one direction, while avenues are 4-lane (2 lanes per direction) dual carriageway roads the same size as highways, with some shrubbery in the center strip (defined by the wealth of buildings on the road). Avenues have a lower capacity than highways, but are more easily accessible and allow buildings to be placed adjacent to them. Avenues could be made in SimCity 4's predecessor, SimCity 3000, by building two roads parallel to each other; however, they are not present in the original SimCity 4.

The ground highway was also a new addition, which is cheaper but more obtrusive than elevated highways, but still carries the same capacity and can connect to roads in the same way. The t-intersection for highways was also introduced.

Another addition is a toll booth which can be placed on roads, highways, or avenues in order to get money. However, they can worsen traffic congestion and lower the player's mayor rating.

=== Public transportation ===
Major changes to the public transportation section were made. The monorail, a fast moving above-ground railway, was introduced for high density areas. Unlike its similar partner, the above-ground railway (Elevated Rail), the monorail is much more modern-looking and faster, and also can be built over ground level roads, highways, avenues, streets and railways, much like an elevated highway. The elevated rail is cheaper than the monorail and can connect to the city's subway system.

The public parking garage was also introduced, which can be placed next to stations and bus stops to create a "park and ride" system.

=== Water transport ===
The ferry system was introduced as the only change to the water transport section. The ferry system came in two types: Passenger, for people only, and Car and Passenger, for both. The ferries allow sections of a city that are separated by water to be connected without incurring the cost of constructing a bridge or tunnel.

=== Route query ===
The Rush Hour route query tool shows how Sims travel to, from, and across a building or road.

Another new feature in Rush Hour is the route query; with it, it is possible to check the routes the Sims use to get to their jobs, allowing the player to see directly where the Sims need to go and how they do it. It also enables players to examine the number of cars that travel on each road in order to determine which roads are the most congested. In this way, the player can find out where to place public transport stations strategically.

=== Disasters ===
Two new disasters are included in the pack, UFO attack and Autosaurus Wrecks. The UFO attack summons a mother ship which fires a destructive blast and spawns smaller ships. Autosaurus Wrecks is a robotic monster made of road vehicles, which bears similarities to MechaGodzilla. Autosaurus will go on a rampage, and eventually explode.

== Development ==
SimCity 4: Rush Hour was first announced at E3 2003, and was developed in Maxis' development studio based in Walnut Creek, California. To promote the release of Rush Hour, Maxis offered $10 rebates to owners of the base game upon purchase of the expansion. SimCity 4 Deluxe Edition, which includes both SimCity 4 and Rush Hour was released on September 25, 2003. Composers Jerry Martin, Andy Brick and conductor Petr Pololanik worked with the seventy-piece Moravian Philharmonic Orchestra to record five songs for the soundtrack in Olomouc, Czech Republic. The remainder of the soundtrack was composed by Martin, as well as The Humble Brothers, Walt Szalva, and Edwin Dolinski. EA Games freely hosts the soundtrack for download. Due to Macintosh computers switching to Intel processors, the Mac version of Rush Hour developed for old hardware became deprecated. In April 2007, Aspyr Media released a public beta of an updated version of Rush Hour with greater Intel Mac compatibility.

== Reception ==
Reception

Aggregate score
Aggregator	Score
Metacritic	79/100

Review scores
Publication	Score
4Players	90%
Clubic	4.5/5
GameZone	8.6/10
GameSpot	8.3/10
IGN	8/10
Jeuxvideo.com	16/20
X-Play	4/5
Game Informer	7.5/10
Eurogamer	7/10
Games Domain	3.5/5
Gameplanet	3.5/5
GameSpy	3/5

SimCity 4: Rush Hour received generally positive reviews, with a score of 79/100 according to review aggregator Metacritic. Positive reviews praised the new features, specifically the focus on new transportation options. Many negative reviews did also welcome some of the new transport options; however, critics felt that the U-Drive-It mode was incomplete and frustrating to use, and that the overall difficulty of successful city management from the base game remained intact. Both positive and negative reviews remarked that many of the quality-of-life changes and features introduced should have been included in the base game, as opposed to an expansion.

== See also ==
- List of Sim video games
