= SimCity: BuildIt =

2014 mobile game

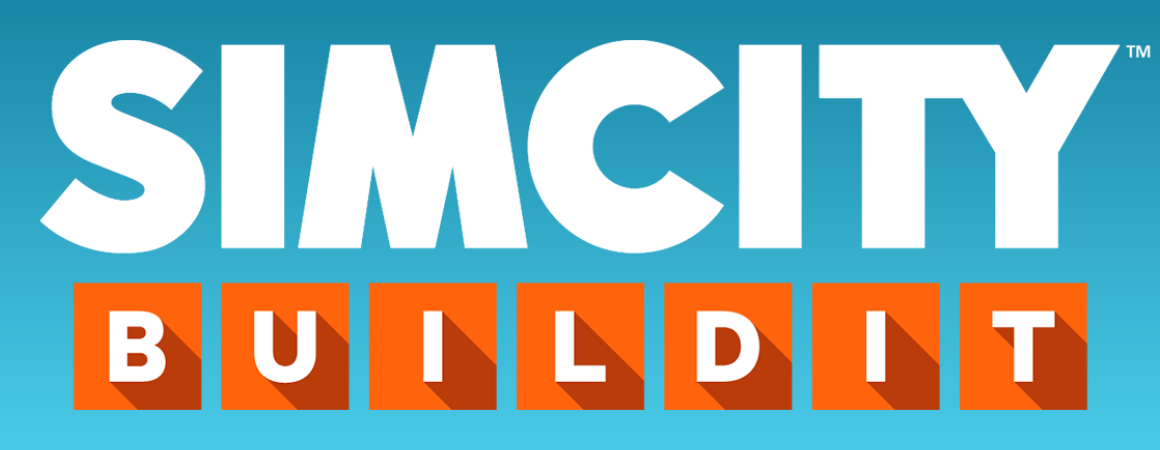
- Developer: EA Tracktwenty
- Publisher: Electronic Arts
- Series: SimCity
- Platforms: Android; iOS; Kindle Fire
- Release: December 16, 2014
- Genre: City-building
- Mode: Single-player

SimCity: BuildIt is a 2014 mobile city-building game developed by Tracktwenty and published by Electronic Arts. The game is part of the SimCity franchise, and is available to download from the Google Play Store, Amazon Appstore, and the Apple App Store.

This game allows players to solve real-life situations like fire, sewage, pollution, traffic, parks, and helps deal with public problems. Players can connect and compete with other players for more connected gameplay.

A screenshot showing a level 15 city in the game

== Development and release ==
SimCity: BuildIt is developed by Tracktwenty, a studio based in Helsinki, Finland. Development for the game had started after the release of the 2013 massively multiplayer online role-playing game (MMORPG) SimCity in an effort to develop a game quicker than prior installments and at a much higher profit margin. BuildIt also utilises assets from SimCity. In December 2014, the game was released on the App Store and Google Play.

== Reception ==
Reception

Aggregate score
Aggregator	Score
Metacritic	58/100

Review scores
Publication	Score
IGN	3.5/5
X-Play	3/5
Pocket Gamer	2.5/5
TouchArcade	4/5
PC Magazine	4/5

Review aggregator Metacritic indicated that Simcity BuildIt had received an average score rating of 76 out of 100, which indicates "mixed or average" reviews. In 2018, according to EA Mobile, SimCity: BuildIt became the most-played SimCity game ever. The game stayed in the top 10 in U.S. sim and strategy games on iOS platforms, in the top 100 for U.S. games overall, and in the top 150 games globally. PCMag's Tony Hoffman had praised the game for its offline play and "well-integrated online features.", but criticized the over-indulgence of currencies. Paul Hatton at TechRadar had felt that the game's user interface (UI) was "incredibly easy to navigate". However, the reviewer had criticized the game's "cash-grab ploy".
