= Always-on DRM =

Form of DRM

Always-on DRM or always-online DRM is a form of digital rights management (DRM) that requires a consumer to remain connected to a server, especially through an internet connection, to use a particular product. The practice is also referred to as persistent online authentication. The technique is meant to prevent copyright infringement of software. Like other DRM methods, always-on DRM has proven controversial, mainly because it has failed to stop pirates from illegally using the product, while causing severe inconvenience to people who bought the product legally due to the single point of failure it inherently introduces.

== Usage and criticism ==
Popular video games such as Diablo III, Super Mario Run, and Starcraft 2 employ always-on DRM by requiring players to connect to the internet to play, even in single-player mode. Reviews of Diablo III criticized its use of always-on DRM. As with Diablo III, SimCity (2013) experienced bugs at its launch due to always-on DRM. Its developer, Maxis, initially defended the practice as being a result of the game's reliance on cloud computing for in-game processing, but it was later confirmed that cloud computing was only necessary to support the inter-city and social media mechanisms. Tim Willits at id Software has also defended the use of always-on DRM, arguing that it would make updates easier. This later received even more criticism, with users stating that these updates could potentially render the game unable to be played.

A major disadvantage of always-on DRM is that whenever the DRM authentication server goes down or a region experiences an Internet outage, it effectively locks out people from playing the game, hence the criticism. Another major disadvantage is that when the servers for the game are shut down, the game is rendered completely unplayable without illegal DRM circumvention, such as in the case of Darkspore and the Mac edition of The Settlers 7.

Ubisoft's first titles requiring an always-on connection were Silent Hunter 5: Battle of the Atlantic and Assassin's Creed II, of which the former had reportedly been cracked as of the first day of the game's release. Assassin's Creed II was later cracked on the day of its release in Japan. Ubisoft also used always-on DRM in Driver: San Francisco, which was also cracked. However, the company announced in September 2012 that it would not employ always-on DRM in its future games, although they decided to re-implement the DRM again for The Crew (despite having a story mode), The Division (although it was never meant for single-player gameplay) and For Honor. Assassin's Creed Odyssey also received backlash for being unavailable in offline mode in February 2019, to which Ubisoft has clarified that the always-online mode was a glitch that was to be fixed soon enough, although many other players did not face this issue and were able to play the game without an internet connection.

The Crew garnered criticism due to it being always-online in spite of having a single-player campaign. Ubisoft later confirmed that the game would not be available offline, as they wanted to make the game a living world with multiplayer and single-player combined. In April 2024, the servers for The Crew were shut down, rendering the game unplayable. This caused severe player backlash, with multiple lawsuits as well as the Stop Killing Games consumer movement being launched. Due to the negative reactions, Ubisoft promised to bring an offline mode to The Crew 2 and The Crew Motorfest, sequels to The Crew that were also always-online at launch. The Crew 2 received an offline mode in an October 2025 update, with Motorfest's implementation coming later.

Electronic Arts was later criticized for making their game Need for Speed (2015) always online, even though it had both single player and multiplayer modes. EA later stated that this was because the game was an ever-expanding world that would be constantly updated and that it would be required for taking snapshots and posting them on Autolog, which would earn the player Experience points and other rewards if the snapshots are liked enough. This later garnered more criticism. In the end, it was later found out that the reason for drastic framerate drops in Need for Speed on all platforms was because of the always-online connection. Because of this, EA decided to make all their later games to be playable offline, with the next Need for Speed game, Payback, having an offline single-player campaign mode.

Sony Interactive Entertainment and Polyphony Digital were later criticized for making their latest title, Gran Turismo 7, require constant internet connection in order for players to be able to save their progress. The series creator Kazunori Yamauchi explains that this decision was made to prevent hacking and cheating, with only Arcade Mode being fully playable offline. This was met with severe criticism by reviewers, who noted the game's overall grind to earn credits and the online requirement being used as a major push for the game's microtransactions, More than a week after release, the game had a maintenance period during which it was unplayable for more than a day before being patched.

Activision has recently been criticized for making their games on the PC always-online via Battle.net even if they have single-player modes. This was most apparent with Call of Duty Modern Warfare (2019), Call of Duty Modern Warfare 2 Remastered, Tony Hawk's Pro Skater 1+2, and Crash Bandicoot 4: It's About Time.

Hitman (2016) was later criticized to be always-online to be able to save in certain areas of levels in the game. Square Enix clarified that there would be no fix for it as the game was "a constantly, evolving, living world of assassination that will grow alongside the community with frequent content updates in between the launch of each location. This live content includes new contracts, escalation contracts, elusive targets, and even additional challenges", and while it is possible to play the game offline, two separate save states for both offline and online have been made. However, the game was later patched to make sure that all locations and levels could be fully played in offline mode, with the disadvantage being that leaderboards would not be accessible, regular updates would not be installed, live events would not be available for playing, and some areas could not be used as a starting point during missions.

Square Enix later received criticism for implementing always-on DRM on the remastered version of Final Fantasy X/X-2 in 2019, over two years after the game launched. Square Enix later removed the update altogether for further modifications.

Quantum Break, a game developed by Remedy was also criticized for being always-online on the PC version, due to the fact that live episodes limited to 4K resolution had to be streamed because of storage limitations according to Microsoft, despite the fact that personal computers can be constantly upgraded with more storage as time goes by. Nevertheless, it is possible to play the game offline without logging into Microsoft, but it will result in the live-action cutscenes in the game being disabled, leaderboards becoming inaccessible, and it will also result with another consequence, the game's protagonist Jack Joyce wearing a pirate eyepatch, which is a reference to another Remedy-developed and Microsoft-published game Alan Wake, where the protagonist Alan Wake would wear an eyepatch should the Steam version of the game ever be pirated. Playing the game offline without logging into Windows Store will make the game think that it has been pirated and make Jack wear the eyepatch, but warez group 3DM managed to make a trainer for the game with an option to remove the eyepatch.

The 2016 reboot of Doom was also later criticized of requiring to be always-online in order to use the Vulkan API recently implemented in the game in an update, although it can still run offline with the OpenGL executable.

Originally an online-only game, Star Wars: Battlefront (2015) was patched by Electronic Arts with an offline mode in July 2016.

Xbox Play Anywhere games like ReCore, Gears of War 4, and Forza Horizon 3 have also been criticized of being required to be online to be launched and to be authenticated every 24 hours. Denuvo was also immensely criticized of using a similar method, and many tech reviewers had problems benchmarking Denuvo-implemented games like Tom Clancy's Ghost Recon: Wildlands and Deus Ex: Mankind Divided.

As of October 2015, in the U.S. always-online games with single player modes that now have had dead servers for six months and longer are now exempt from DMCA prohibitions on circumventing copyright protection.

During the month of October 2019 with the launch of Rockstar Games Launcher, the single player story mode for the game Grand Theft Auto V sold and distributed through Steam required activation via the internet every time during the game startup process, whereas previously the game required periodic activation every few days. Whether this was intentional or defective by design due to the effect of implementing Rockstar Games Launcher as an extra layer of DRM for the game is unclear, neither the game developer and publisher Rockstar Games, or the game distributor Valve has publicly acknowledged or commentated on the change in status of the DRM. On 5 November 2019 Rockstar Games rolled out an update to the Rockstar Games Launcher which reverted the DRM status of Grand Theft Auto V from Always-on DRM back to its previous periodic activation implementation.

Always-on DRM is not restricted to computer games, as it was discovered early into the ninth generation of video game consoles that a form of it exists in the programming and design of three generations of PlayStation consoles, the PlayStation 3, the PlayStation 4, and the PlayStation 5, as well as the Xbox Series X/S, due to gaming consoles' increasing reliance on internet connectivity. All three PlayStation consoles can only be fully operational when persistently connected to the PlayStation Network and depend on it to maintain the date and time, which are used to prevent players from cheating by claiming that they unlocked Trophies at an unreasonably early time. When such connection is lost, these systems rely on an internal CMOS battery to maintain the date and time, and if that is depleted or removed, all digitally downloaded games become unplayable as the system would thus have no means to ascertain the current date and time. This issue, known as C-bomb, adversely affects the PS4 most, as the mandatory date and time check also extends to physical games, meaning that such system will be unable to play any games at all should such check fail. In late September 2021, Sony released a firmware update for the PS4 that resolved the issue, so that only time-stamping of Trophies would be disabled if no accurate date and time can be obtained from PSN. A similar fix was also issued for the PS5 in November. The Xbox Series X/S has a DRM system that requires the console to remain connected to the Xbox network to set up the system or start disc-based backwards compatible games. In September 2022, Microsoft issued a system update that allowed backwards compatibility to function offline. These DRM measures can hinder video game preservation should the online services that use them become discontinued at any point in the future.

== Circumvention ==
Always-on DRM can be circumvented mainly by the use of custom servers made by the game's community via reverse engineering game clients and studying how they communicate with servers, then re-implementing those functions on a custom server. The success-rate of such efforts is contingent on several factors, such as how much of a game’s systems are processed on the server, whether the game’s official servers are still running, and how much interest the game-playing public has had in the game to begin with. Efforts to revive EA Phenomic’s BattleForge (which reached end-of-life in 2013) with a custom server bore fruit as early as 2017, with full functionality to the game restored in 2021. Meanwhile, no such breakthroughs exist for Maxis Emeryville’s Darkspore, which was sunset in early 2016 and remains unplayable as of 2024.

== See also ==
- Digital distribution
- Phoning home
