= Gmax =

Computer graphics software

Screenshot

Gmax is an application based on Autodesk's 3ds Max application used by professional computer graphics artists. 3ds Max is a comprehensive modeling, animation and rendering package with some secondary post-production and compositing features. Gmax is much more limited due to its singular intended use—game content creation. Infrequently used tools and features, or the ones completely unrelated to creating 3D game models, were removed (these include most, if not all of the more complex rendering, materials, shaders, physics simulation, some of the more advanced geometry tools, in addition to the rendering engine), leaving the core modeling, texturing, and basic animation rigging and keyframing capabilities. In 2005, the promotional freeware software was discontinued after version 1.2.

== Features ==
Gmax's utility can be expanded by "game packs" which feature customized tools that allow creation and exporting of customizable content to games and websites. As Gmax did not have its parent software's rendering engine, game packs were typically required to provide those features when needed(Auran was the first company to write and distribute a dedicated renderer for their Trainz Railroad Simulator series Gmax gamepacks in their initial pre-production Beta Release V0.9 (2000). Thereafter Gmax was bundled with subsequentTrainz until Trainz 2009. Maxis was the second company to write a dedicated renderer for their Gmax gamepack, BAT (Building Architect Tool) for SimCity 4 (ca. 2002). In both the game environments, a user can enter the virtual 3D world, interact with the environment, ride a car and sight see, or in the Trainz series of simulators - operate a carefully modeled realistic Train Locomotive, ride in an observation car, automobile, boat, airplane, or steamship.)

The introduction of Gmax and Autodesk's distribution of the core tools was thought to be aimed towards remedying the 'limited-options infringement' of 3D modeling packages that had been widespread among amateur 3D modeling and game mod communities to that point. Until the introduction of Gmax, and a similar 'game modeler' version of Maya soon after, amateur modelers had extremely limited access to the tools needed for 3D artwork. Gmax enabled modelers to have legitimate access to content creation tools similar to those used by professionals.

=== Redistribution ===
Auran/N3V distributed Gmax from the outset as a licensed partner as an included part of the Trainz series of simulators, along with a document "Content Creators" manual, up through and including the release of Trainz 2004 Deluxe, after which they provided a download link in the many versions of TRS2006 before the technology became obsolescent.

Microsoft distributed Gmax with Microsoft Flight Simulator (MSFS) beginning with the 2002 version. Most of the freeware and payware add-on aircraft and scenery is created with Gmax and it's considered to be the standard modeller for MSFS, although it does have competition in the form of the more user-friendly Flight Simulator Design Studio. It can make use of special animations through XML coding written into parts.

== Cancellation ==
As of October 16, 2005 AutoDesk Media and Entertainment has discontinued and no longer supports Gmax. Instead, the company has decided to focus on 3ds Max. However, the last version of Gmax is available for free to download from the official support website.

- Note: As of 2022, you can no longer download the software from Turbo Squid's page.

== Software license agreement ==
There has been some debate as to whether exporting Quake 3 models for use with a game other than Quake 3 is a violation of the Gmax software license agreement (or EULA). Product manager Paul Perreault has publicly stated that "Gmax is a tool to create 3d content—what you create with Gmax is your business, not ours." He continues, "Discreet is not opposed to exporting data from Gmax—provided Discreet is the decision maker about what formats are supported." Export to the Quake 3 model format is officially supported by Discreet. Therefore, using Gmax to create and export models to the .md3 format does not appear to be a violation of the terms of the Gmax EULA.
