= SimCity (2013 video game) =

2013 video game

- Developer: Maxis Emeryville
- Publisher: Electronic Arts
- Producers: Kip Katsarelis; Jason Haber
- Designers: Ocean Quigley; Stone Librande
- Composer: Chris Tilton
- Series: SimCity
- Engine: RenderWare; GlassBox
- Platforms: Windows, macOS
- Release: Windows: NA: March 5, 2013; EU/AU/JP: March 7, 2013; UK: March 8, 2013; macOS: WW: August 29, 2013
- Genre: City-building
- Modes: Single-player, multiplayer

SimCity is a city-building and urban planning simulation massively multiplayer online game developed by Maxis Emeryville and published by Electronic Arts. Released for Microsoft Windows in early March 2013, it is a reboot of the SimCity series, and is the first major installment since the release of SimCity 4 a decade before. A macOS version was released on August 29, 2013.

Players can create a settlement that can grow into a city by zoning land for residential, commercial, or industrial development, as well as building and maintaining public services, transport and utilities. SimCity uses a new engine called GlassBox that allows for more detailed simulation than previous games. Throughout its development, SimCity received critical acclaim for its new engine and reimagined gameplay; publications cautioned the game's mandatory use of a persistent internet connection, however, which enables cloud saves and multiplayer functionality, allowing cities to trade and share resources.

Prior to release, SimCity received positive reviews; nonetheless, the game's launch was received negatively due to widespread technical and gameplay problems related to the mandatory network connection for playing and saving game data. These issues included network outages, problems with saving progress and difficulty connecting to the game's servers. As a result, reviewers were unable to review the game, labeling the launch a "disaster" and the game "unplayably broken", urging players to avoid purchasing the game until the issues were resolved. SimCity was the last game by Maxis Emeryville before the studio's closure in 2015.

== Gameplay ==
Along with many of the cosmetic changes (such as up-to-date 3D graphics), SimCity used a new GlassBox engine. "We try to build what you would expect to see, and that's the game," explained system architect Andrew Willmott, meaning that visual effects such as traffic, economic troubles, and pollution will be more obvious. Two other new features are a multiplayer component and finite resources.

Unlike previous games in the series, the game has non-orthogonal and curved roads and zoning areas that can conform to different road types. Types of zones include residential, commercial and industrial. The density is driven by the types of roads built around these zones.

Cities in a region are connected to each other via predefined regional networks such as highways, railways, and waterways. Elements such as traffic and air pollution are visible flowing between cities. Cities can trade resources or share public services with their neighbors like garbage collection or health care. Cities can also pool their collective wealth and resources to build a "great work" to provide benefits for the entire region like a massive solar power plant or an international airport. The larger the region, the higher is the number of cities and great works that can be built.

Modules in SimCity are attachable structures that can add functionality to existing user-placeable buildings. One example is the extra garage for fire stations, which can provide additional fire trucks for increased protection coverage Another example is the Department of Safety for the City Hall, which unlocks more advanced medical, police and fire department buildings.

The user interface, which was inspired by Google Maps and infographics, was designed to convey information to the player more clearly than in previous SimCity games. Animations and color-coded visual cues that represent how efficiently a city functions are only presented when needed at any given moment. For instance, opening up the water tower instantly changes the landscape to a clear world where the density of water is recognizable, and clicking on the sewage tab will immediately show how the waste of the citizens is flowing, and where the system is over capacity. Some of the other visualized data include air pollution, power distribution, police coverage, and zones.

Many resources in the game are finite. Some are renewable, such as groundwater. Lead gameplay engineer Dan Moskowitz stated, "If you've built up an entire city on the economic basis of extracting a certain resource, when that resource runs out your economy will collapse." Before release, Creative Director Ocean Quigley stated that all of the terraforming in the game would be at the civil engineering scale, and will be the natural consequences of laying out roads, developing zones, and placing buildings.

Different from some previous SimCity titles, each type of zone (residential, commercial, and industrial) is not divided into density categories. Instead, the density of the roads next to them determines the type of buildings that will be created there. This means that there is only one of each zone type, and the density of the buildings is determined by the density of the roads.

A city in SimCity that specializes in education

Roads in SimCity are one of the most fundamental elements of the mechanics. Unlike previous SimCity games, roads carry water, power, and sewage. There are also many new tools for drawing roads. They include a straight line tool, one for making rectangular road squares, one for making sweeping arcs, one for making circles, and one for making free-form roads. There is also a more diverse range of roads to choose from. Starting at dirt roads and going up to six-lane avenues with streetcar tracks, the density of the roads determines the density of the buildings next to them, so dirt roads will only develop low-density buildings. There are two different categories of roads, streets and avenues. Streets are 24 meters wide and avenues are 48 meters wide. Since all streets are the same width, a dirt road can be upgraded to a high-density street. In order to upgrade a street to an avenue, one would need to fully demolish the old street and replace it with a larger avenue. When high and low-capacity roads intersect, the higher density roads have the right-of-way, thus stop lights and stop signs will be automatically placed. In order to space the roads so there will be enough room for buildings to develop, road guides are shown when hovering over an existing road. There are a number transportation options, such as boats, buses, trams, and planes.

Players can specialize cities on certain industries, such as manufacturing, tourism, education, or others. Each have distinct appearances, simulation behavior, and economic strategies. The game featured a simulated global economy, where prices key resources like oil or food fluctuate depending on the game world's supply and demand. In particular, if players all over the world are predominantly selling drilled oil from within their game onto the global market, this will drive the price for this resource down. Conversely, a resource that has experienced very little exposure on the world market will be a scarce resource, driving the price up.

=== Multi-player ===
This version of SimCity is the first to feature full online play since SimCity 2000 Network Edition (1996), allowing for regions to house multiple cities from different players. Regions can alternatively be set to private/invite-only. SimCity requires players to be logged into Electronic Arts (EA)'s Origin gaming service to play the game, even when playing in single-player mode. At release, an active internet connection was required every time the game was launched, and had to be maintained throughout gameplay, until an offline single-player mode was added later via a patch. The connection is asynchronous, so any brief network disturbance will not interrupt the gameplay though outages of longer than 19 minutes, as an editor posted on Kotaku, will cause loss of gamestate when playing online.

Cities in a region can share or sell resources, and work together to build a "Great Works", such as an Arcology.

== Development ==
Prior to its announcement, the German magazine GameStar leaked concept art. Soon thereafter, a pre-rendered trailer was leaked. The official announcement took place on March 6, 2012, at the Game Developers Conference. Initially, it was revealed that the game would be available for the Windows platform, and a later macOS edition was confirmed. EA showcased two new trailers for the game at the Electronic Entertainment Expo 2012, showcasing in-game graphics for the first time.

In August 2012, applicants were allowed to sign up to test closed beta versions of the game that were later released in January and February 2013, in order to perform load testing on the game servers.

SimCity creative director Ocean Quigley confirmed that an macOS version was in development, but would be released at a later point in time than the Windows version.

=== Game engine ===
GlassBox logo

Maxis developed the game using a new simulation engine called GlassBox, which takes a different approach from previous simulation games. The actual engine was conceived and built by Ocean Quigley, and Andrew Willmott of Maxis Studios. Previous games first simulated high-level statistics and then created graphic animations to represent that data. The GlassBox Engine replaces those statistics with agents, simulation units that represent objects like water, power, and workers; each graphic animation is directly linked to an agent's activity. For example, rather than simply displaying a traffic jam animation to represent a simulated traffic flow problem, traffic jams are instead produced dynamically by masses of Sim agents that simulate travel to and from work. A four-part video has been released featuring Dan Moskowitz, the lead gameplay engineer, talking about the engine simulation behavior.

The citizens in the game are also agents and do not lead realistic lives; they go to work at the first job they can find and they go home to the first empty home they find.

After the release of the game, modders created mods that enabled offline play and access to debug developer tools. On January 9, 2014, Maxis published its policy on mods, in which they allow re-skinning and building creation but not mods that modify gameplay behavior.

=== Audio ===
The game's audio is bound to the pulse of the simulation. When a building is running a simulation rule like generating power, for example, its driving music and sound effects that are synchronized to the overall beat of the simulation. The audio is telling the player what the simulation is doing. Audio Director Kent Jolly stated that cars in the game are tracked individually. When a car leaves an intersection, the simulator plays a sound of a car pulling away. The sound also changes based on the speed of the game. As cars go faster, the audio is matched to what the player sees, while remaining true to the actual traffic.

Chris Tilton is the composer of the game's orchestral score. The music subtly adjusts to the player's experience based on various game states. An example of this is when the view is zoomed out, the player will hear a fuller version of the score. When zoomed in, certain elements of the tracks are taken away. This is done to help make room for all the activity going on in the player's city. The music tracks are also written with the population in mind, and the game exposes the full playlist as the player's city develops and grows. Tilton sought to reinvent SimCity's music and not rehash the musical sensibilities of previous games. He stated that all gameplay music was synchronized to 120 BPM, but to add variety, he wrote some tracks in triple meter or with syncopated rhythms while maintaining synchronization.

== Release and launch issues ==
SimCity was released on March 5, 2013, in North America, on March 6 in Europe, Australia, and Japan, and on March 7 in the UK. The game was made available in three editions: the standard edition; the Limited Edition, which includes the Heroes & Villains and Plumbob Park DLC sets; and the Origin-exclusive Digital Deluxe Edition, which additionally includes three European City DLC sets.

The initial release of SimCity in North America suffered multiple severe issues, particularly regarding the game's requirement for a persistent Internet connection. After the game was made available for purchase through EA's Origin delivery service, the high volume of users attempting to download and connect to EA's game servers caused network outages. Players reported experiencing frequent problems during gameplay due to the outages such as long loading times, disconnections, crashing, and loss of saved game data.

The server problems and negative feedback led some publications to refer to the launch as "disastrous" and others have compared the launch unfavorably to that of Diablo III, which experienced similar problems when it was first released. The issues caused online retailer Amazon.com to temporarily withdraw the downloadable version of SimCity from its marketplace, citing customer complaints.

It was also discovered that there were several issues with the GlassBox engine, such as traffic taking the shortest route instead of the route with the most available capacity, and sims not living persistent lives but rather going to the nearest available workplace for work and nearest available house after work.

=== Post-release ===
EA responded to server issues by adding additional servers and developing a server patch that disables "non-critical gameplay features [including] leaderboards, achievements and region filters." On the evening of March 7, Maxis general manager Lucy Bradshaw issued a statement in response to the launch problems, stating that more servers would be added over the weekend, thousands of players were playing and "more than 700,000 cities have been built by our players in just 24 hours". She went on to acknowledge that "many are experiencing server instability" and that "players across Europe and Asia are experiencing the same frustration". She confirmed that the number of servers would be increased stating "We added servers today, and there will be several more added over the weekend."

Senior producer Kip Katsarelis commented that the game servers were constantly at maximum capacity, partly due to the large number of players connected for extended periods of time, which has made it difficult for new users to connect: "We added more servers to accommodate the launch in [Australia, Japan, and Europe]... our plan is to continue to bring more servers online until we have enough to meet the demand, increase player capacity and let more people through the gates and into the game."

In an article about "games as a service", Nathan Grayson from Rock, Paper, Shotgun said that the situation was unacceptable and that EA was handling the situation as well as could be expected, but the problem was that they had damaged the idea of "games as a service" and lamented the fact that games publishers hadn't learned from previous similar launch failures: "this just keeps on happening. ... servers have gone toe-to-toe with day-one stampedes in much the same fashion as a turtle against an 18-wheeler: ... Then nature runs its course, and developers and publishers alike scramble to glue one billion bits of finely pulped turtle back together again," and added, "A strong service – the kind people latch onto and ultimately demand as the norm – doesn't just react."

On March 8, 2013, EA suspended some of SimCity's online marketing campaigns because of the game's ongoing technical problems. EA has stated it will not be offering refunds for users.

In a blog post on March 8, Bradshaw gave an update on the server situation, reporting that the issues had improved and server space had expanded but acknowledged that some users were still suffering stability problems. She also explained the reason for the failure: "So what went wrong? The short answer is: a lot more people logged on than we expected. More people played and played in ways we never saw in the beta" and called their error "dumb". She reported that server capacity had been increased by 120 percent and that errors had dropped by 80 percent. She also promised another update during the weekend. She also announced an offer of a free game from the EA catalog, saying "I know that's a little contrived – kind of like buying a present for a friend after you did something crummy. But we feel bad about what happened. We're hoping you won't stay mad and that we'll be friends again when SimCity is running at 100 percent." Maxis ruled out making the game able to be played offline, saying it would take a significant amount of engineering work for this to happen. Shortly afterwards, it was discovered that a line of code could be commented out, allowing the game to be played offline indefinitely. In addition, an article published by Rock, Paper, Shotgun highlighted ways in which "They could make an entire region single player offline with absolute ease."

The launch failures also led to fans of the series filing a petition through We the People on the official White House website calling for "an industry-wide return policy for video games that rely on remote servers and DRM to function properly", which was later covered by mainstream news organizations such as NBC News.

To compensate for the issues during the release, EA offered to early purchasers a free game in March 2013. All Origin users who purchased and registered the game before March 23 were allowed to choose a game for free among a selected list of EA titles, including SimCity 4, Battlefield 3, Dead Space 3, Mass Effect 3 and Need for Speed: Most Wanted.

EA maintains a Server Status page in the SimCity website. This allowed players to check the status of SimCity servers around the world.

=== Patches ===
Since the initial release, Maxis has distributed patches to the game via the in-game patching utility that automatically runs when the game is launched on a user's computer. These patches have addressed, though not entirely fixed, among many other things, issues such as traffic intelligence, game-save rollbacks, and emergency vehicle routing. Maxis has continued to update the game to improve gameplay quality and eliminate bugs.

A month following the game launch day, Maxis had released 8 official patches, bringing the game to version 1.8. Maxis released a 2.0 patch, purported to make significant improvements to gameplay and curb defects, that was distributed on April 22, 2013. On May 23, 2013, Maxis released patch 4.0, giving players more updates to the game and re-enabling leader boards. Patch 6 was released July 30, 2013, and included the game's second new region added since the original release date. Patch 7.0, a notable update for users, was released on August 22, 2013. This patch included the addition of a bridge and tunnel tool, letting players create overpasses and underpasses. The update also improved traffic, making it smarter. All patches that have been released have included patch notes describing the contents of the patch and can be found on EA's forums.

An offline mode was released in Update 10. The game can now be saved to the local disk, and cities are static and do not operate while the player is working on an adjacent city.

=== Complete Edition ===
On November 13, 2014, EA released SimCity: Complete Edition exclusively on Origin. The compilation release contains the Digital Deluxe Edition of SimCity (including the British City, French City, and German City Set), the Cities of Tomorrow expansion pack, plus the Amusement Park and Airships DLC sets. It does not include the Launch Arcology DLC set of the Cities of Tomorrow Limited Edition.

== Reception ==
=== Pre-release ===
At E3 2012 in June 2012, SimCity won 8 awards out of 24 nominations. On August 23, 2012, SimCity won Gamescom's "Best PC Game" award. The Gamescom jury described the video game as having "fantastic graphics" and "struck the right balance between retaining the trademarks of the old parts and making it interesting for beginners". On December 14, 2012, the SimCity development team ran a questions-and-answers session on the Internet community Reddit where they received criticism for the game's DRM mechanisms, which require the user to be persistently connected to Electronic Arts' servers in order to be able to play the game. The video games-focused blog Kotaku also voiced concern over the issue, worrying that Electronic Arts could one day shut down their servers, rendering the game unplayable.

This prompted a blog response from Bradshaw, in which she defended the always-online component with the comment that "real cities do not exist in a bubble; they share a region and affect one another." She goes on to say that increased connectivity to neighboring cities allows for a better experience, allowing for better trade and wider scale effects such as crime and pollution to keep synchronized across the region. Bradshaw also noted the performance benefit due to the engine using EA's server hardware to assist in gameplay calculations.

Rock, Paper, Shotgun pointed out after the release that cloud resources were not used to support gameplay computation but simply to support inter-city and social media mechanisms. The information was also reported in the mainstream media Those were confirmed by a change in rhetoric from Bradshaw.

After the first beta, EA Management staff discussed Q4 2012 results during which Peter Moore commented on the success of the beta, "SimCity, a completely new version of the treasured classic, includes deep online features. More than 100,000 people played the SimCity beta last weekend, [...] and the critical reception is shaping up well."

=== Critical reception ===
Reception

Aggregate scores
Aggregator	Score
GameRankings	63.82%
Metacritic	64/100

Review scores
Publication	Score
Computer and Video Games	6.8/10
Destructoid	4/10
Eurogamer	4/10
Game Informer	6.5/10
GameRevolution	3.5/5
GameSpot	5.0/10
GamesRadar+	3/5
GameTrailers	8.0/10
Giant Bomb	3/5
IGN	7.0/10
Joystiq	2.5/5
PC Gamer (US)	69/100
Polygon	6.5/10
The Guardian	2/5
The Daily Telegraph	2/5

Upon release, SimCity was met with mostly mixed reviews, many of which were downgraded after reviewers received reports of server problems. It received mixed to negative reception soon after, with GameRankings and Metacritic assigning scores of 63.82% and 64/100, respectively.

The issues surrounding the launch affected critics' opinions and reviews of the game. Eurogamer, CNET, and IGN delayed their reviews due to being unable to connect to the game servers, and Polygon, which had reviewed the game before the launch, later dropped its 9.5/10 score down to 8/10, then later dropping it again to 4/10 in response to both the issues, and EA's decision to disable gameplay features. Josh Derocher of Destructoid gave a rating of 4/10, saying that despite his enjoyment of the game, "the online dependency, forced multiplayer, and DRM ruin it." Other critics such as Rock, Paper, Shotgun also noted the launch issues with the always-online nature of the game, servers, and cloud save systems. According to Rock, Paper, Shotgun, because a server connection is required even for single-player games, "the game, by its very design, is hideously broken." Leif Johnson writing for GameTrailers gave the game an 8.0/10 stating, "Aside from some issues with its online requirements, bugs, and restrictions on city size, it's still a satisfying and addicting simulator that will grant dozens of hours of entertainment with one well-designed city alone." CNET UK reported on March 6 that review aggregator Metacritic accumulated a user score of 2.0/10 and several critics reported that the product on Amazon.com had an average rating of 1/5 stars. Amazon customers and the press reported problems with path-finding and artificial intelligence, broken economic simulation, multiplayer aspect not working as advertised, and iconic features missing compared to previous installments of the game.

SimCity was also criticized for the size of the area the player is given to build a city; critics have noted it to be significantly smaller than what was available in previous games. Maxis responded to this criticism by stating that this was a deliberate compromise to ensure that the game would run smoothly on the majority of users' computers. Maxis has acknowledged that city size is a major complaint, but has stated that they are not currently working on an increase in size. Instead, they have stated that larger areas may appear in an upcoming release or expansion of the game. In October 2013, Maxis stated that due to player feedback, they attempted to implement larger cities through "months of testing", but ultimately decided to abandon the concept as "the system performance challenges [Maxis] encountered would mean that the vast majority of [SimCity's] players wouldn't be able to load, much less play with bigger cities."

=== Sales ===
SimCity sold over 1.1 million copies in its first two weeks, 54 percent of which were of the download version of the game. As of July 2013, the game had sold over two million copies.

== Expansion pack ==
SimCity: Cities of Tomorrow cover art

An expansion pack titled Cities of Tomorrow was announced on September 19, 2013. It was released on November 12, 2013, and is set fifty years in the future. It features new regions, technology, city specializations, and transportation methods.

The new features in Cities of Tomorrow are divided into three categories: "MegaTowers", "Academy" and the "OmegaCo". The MegaTowers are massive buildings built floor by floor with each floor having a specific purpose, being residential, commercial, or to provide services like schools, security, power, and entertainment. Each floor can provide jobs, services, or housing for hundreds of citizens at the same time. The Academy is a futuristic research center that provides a signal called "ControlNet" to power up structures and improvements developed there and the OmegaCo is composed of factories used to produce an elusive commodity from crude oil and ore only known as "Omega" to increase the profits from residential, commercial and industrial buildings alike and manufacture drones to further improve the coverage of healthcare, police, fire services or just be used by citizens to perform shopping in their places, thus reducing traffic. Over time, it is revealed that Omega has several downsides including causing people to fall ill, creating excess garbage and making buildings spontaneously combust.

The expansion also supports "futurization", in which futuristic buildings tend to "futurize" the buildings, roads, and services around them by significantly blending the roads and buildings to simply make them look more futuristic, such as differences in traffic lights (they have a different sprite), turning service cars more futuristic (futurizing a police station will significantly change the cars and architecture), and so on. Buildings that will futurize the vicinity are distinguished with a hexagon pattern at the lower part of the building when viewed in the Construction screen.

Cities of Tomorrow was released in three editions: the standard edition, the Limited Edition, which contains the Launch Arcology DLC set, and an Origin edition, which contains the Skyclops Coaster Crown DLC set.

=== Reception ===
Reception

Aggregate score
Aggregator	Score
Metacritic	61/100

Review scores
Publication	Score
Eurogamer	6/10
GameSpot	5/10
IGN	7.5/10
PC Gamer (UK)	69%

Cities of Tomorrow received mixed reviews from critics. Brett Todd for GameSpot noted that "you're left with a game that hides the same dissatisfying experience under a more attractive surface," calling the expansion "more of the same." Paul Dean for EuroGamer wrote the expansion pack was "heading in the right direction," but "it still doesn't make SimCity a particularly good game."

== Legacy ==
The server issues on launch resulted in wider changes to Maxis and EA in the following years. EA moved away from its near-exclusive focus on always-online titles that had been company policy since 2012. This resulted in major changes to The Sims 4, which was being developed as an always-online, multiplayer title, and was ultimately reworked as a single-player title.

Aside from a reworked 2014 mobile entry SimCity: BuildIt, no further entries of the SimCity series have been developed, and developer Maxis Emeryville was shut down in 2015. The negative response to SimCity also encouraged Paradox Interactive to green-light development of their city-building game Cities: Skylines, which released in 2015 to more positive reception, and has been considered a spiritual successor to the franchise.
