= Stone Librande =

American video game designer (born 1972)

- Born: January 20, 1972 (age 54); Elverson, Pennsylvania
- Occupation: Game designer
- Known for: Diablo III; Mechs vs. Minions; SimCity (2013); Spore

Stone Librande is an American video game designer at the video game publisher Riot Games. He was the lead designer of Diablo III at Blizzard Entertainment and creative director of SimCity at Electronic Arts.

Stone is a frequent speaker at the Game Developers Conference where he has given several talks about game design:

- 2009: The Paper Prototypes of Spore
- 2010: One Page Designs
- 2011: 15 Games in 15 Years
- 2012: Designing Games for Game Designers
- 2013: Simulating a City - One Page at a Time
- 2015: game < design
