= SimCity 4 =

2003 video game

- Developers: Maxis i5works (Mac OS X)
- Publishers: Electronic Arts; Aspyr (Mac OS X)
- Producers: Kevin Hogan; Sean Decker
- Designers: Joseph Knight; Michael McCormick
- Programmer: Paul Pedriana
- Artists: Ocean Quigley; David Patch
- Writers: Dorothy Bradshaw; Tom Bentley
- Composer: Jerry Martin
- Series: SimCity
- Engine: Gonzo-Rizzo
- Platforms: Windows, Mac OS X
- Release: Windows: NA: January 14, 2003; EU: January 17, 2003; Mac OS X: NA: June 27, 2003
- Genre: City-building
- Mode: Single-player

SimCity 4 is a city-building simulation video game developed by Maxis, a subsidiary of Electronic Arts. The game was released in January 2003 for Microsoft Windows and in June 2003 for Mac OS X. It is the fourth major installment in the SimCity series. SimCity 4 has a single expansion pack called Rush Hour which adds features to the game. SimCity 4: Deluxe Edition contains the original game and Rush Hour combined as a single product.

The game allows players to create a region of land by terraforming, and then to design and build a settlement which can grow into a city. Players can zone different areas of land as commercial, industrial, or residential development, as well as build and maintain public services, transport and utilities. For the success of a city, players must manage its finances, environment, and quality of life for its residents. SimCity 4 introduces night and day cycles and other special effects for the first time in the SimCity series. External tools such as the Building Architect Tool (BAT) allow custom third-party buildings and content to be added to the gameplay.

SimCity 4 was praised for being the first game in the main SimCity series to primarily use a 3D engine to render its graphics, following the implementation of 3D graphics in SimCity 64 for the Nintendo 64DD. It received widespread acclaim, won several awards, and was one of the top ten selling PC games of 2003. However, it was criticized for its difficulty and its demands on computer performance.

== Gameplay ==
=== Regional gameplay ===
A collection of neighboring cities, as seen in the game's regional view

As with previous SimCity titles, SimCity 4 places players in the role of a mayor, tasked with populating and developing tracts of lands into cities, while fulfilling the needs of fellow Sims that live in the cities. Cities are located in regions that are divided into segments, each of which can be developed. The player has the option of starting the city in a segment of any of three area sizes. In real measurements, the smallest has a length of one kilometer on a side, and the largest has a length of four kilometers on a side. The size of a region and its layout of segments can be changed in a bitmap file provided for each region.

Neighbor cities play a larger role than in the previous versions of the game. Neighbor deals can be established where a city can exchange resources such as water, electricity and garbage disposal with other cities for money. Players may develop several inter-dependent cities at the same time, eventually populating the entire region.

=== Game modes ===
Upon selecting a specific segment in a region, the gameplay is divided into three "modes": god mode, mayor mode, and MySim mode. Mayor and MySim modes become available after establishing a city. God mode is available before establishing a city and afterwards, albeit with fewer functions. Obliterating the city resets the map and reactivates all functions in God mode.

==== God mode ====
God mode allows players to design or terraform a selected tract of land where the city will be built and permits players to trigger disasters, including tornadoes and earthquakes among several others. Players can select an area where a disaster will occur and even control the direction of certain disasters. Most terraforming tools are disabled after the city is named and founded. The player still has some terraforming tools made available in mayor mode, although they become very limited and expensive, and they can still trigger disasters at will.

In addition to these abilities, god mode also gives the player tools to reconcile the borders of the cities, so as to fix any discrepancies created during the terraforming process, and a day/night cycle adjustment, so that one can make it always day, always night, or alternate between day or night in accordance with the in-universe game clock. Both the ability to reconcile the city edges and the ability to modify the day/night cycle are available even once the city has been established.

==== Mayor mode ====
A densely populated city, including third-party modifications

In mayor mode, city building is conducted. Several advisors may give advice to the player on how to best manage a city. Players can build transportation networks, which include roads, streets, avenues, highways, railways, subway lines, and bus stations, draw out building zones, construct civic buildings, and adjust city funding and tax rates. Players can also terraform and plant trees in this mode, but in a much smaller scale than in god mode and costing money.

Zones are planned building plots that are empty at first but then populated by buildings depending on the type and density of the zone. Areas of land can be zoned as residential, commercial or industrial areas in various densities where the city will begin to grow. Agriculture is a separate industrial zone-type, unlike previous versions of SimCity, enabling farms to grow regardless of high land value, so long as demand exists for agriculture and agricultural zones have been provided. Zones are now automatically aligned towards roads and most buildings must be adjacent to a road in order to function properly; streets are automatically created when zoning on large tracts of land.

Buildings are classified into several wealth levels, zone types, and building size stages, which are affected by the region's population and the city's condition. The game simulates urban decay and gentrification with buildings deteriorating and refurbished accordingly. Buildings originally constructed for occupation by higher wealth tenants can now support lower wealth tenants in the event surrounding factors forces the current tenants to vacate the building; this allows certain buildings to remain in use despite lacking its initial occupants. Buildings and lots can be constructed on slopes.

Civic buildings can be constructed that need constant funding to work properly, such as schools, hospitals, parks, police stations, jails, and fire stations. These buildings come in two or more sizes compared to the single, universal types that were used in previous games. Settlements also need public utilities such as electricity with more or less polluting and more or less expensive types of power stations, water pumps, water purification plants, and waste management services. Facilities that had previously provided citywide coverage, such as educational facilities and medical facilities, have been modified to provide more limited coverage, as it has been with police stations and fire stations in previous SimCity titles.

Funding can be adjusted for individual buildings rather than having to change the funding to all buildings, allowing users to specify how much money should be spent to supply a service in accordance to the local population. Maintenance expenses for public utility facilities will increase as they age. The maximum output of facilities also decreases as they get older, with the rate dependent on the facility's percentage of its capacity being used and level of funding.

==== MySim mode ====
MySim mode enables players to create user-defined Sims, who will live and work in the city the player has created. When moving a Sim into a city, the player can choose from a selection of characters or import others from The Sims. Sims can be killed by certain disasters or catastrophic events, leave the city if conditions are unfavorable, or die of old age. After they die, their "child" sometimes takes over for them by taking their name, house, and job.

=== Building designs ===
Buildings in SimCity 4 are based on four distinct architectural styles, which can be selected individually or simultaneously for buildings to be built from. The earliest era is based on early office towers from Chicago, Illinois, in the 1890s, the second era encompasses an Art Deco-based set from New York City based on the 1940s, the third includes a modernist/international style based on buildings from Houston, Texas in the 1990s, and the final is a modern European architecture based mostly around Germany in the 2000s. There are a number of buildings based on those found in San Francisco, including the Shell Building (appearing as "Wren Insurance"), 450 Sutter Street (appearing as "Vu Financial"), and the Pacific Telephone & Telegraph Building also known as 140 New Montgomery Street (as "The Galvin Corp"). The May Company store (now LACMA West) in Los Angeles appears as "Dennis Department Store." The game also includes famous landmarks from various cities, such as the Empire State Building from New York City.

== Development ==
=== Graphics ===
Unlike its predecessors, which used an engine based on 2D isometric graphics and sprites, SimCity 4 primarily uses a 3D engine to render its graphics. The landscape and moving props such as vehicles are modeled as fully polygonal and rotatable 3D objects. Small buildings and props are drawn as flat images, which are pasted onto billboards; polygons with their surface normal facing into the camera. Larger buildings are modeled using a hybrid approach; a simple polygonal model defines the shape of the building, then textures are added to create detail such as doors, windows and rooftop clutter.

Although a 3D engine is used, the camera in SimCity 4 is restricted to a fixed trimetric orthographic projection for performance reasons. Additionally, a simulated city can now be seen at nighttime as well as during daytime. The time of the day does not affect the gameplay.

=== Audio ===
The game includes over three hours of background music in MP3 format, ranging from three to eight minutes in length. The music is divided between that used in region mode and god mode, and that used in the city view in mayor mode and MySim mode. In addition, the game has a facility for players to use their own music in the game, also divided between the two views. The music, largely composed by Jerry Martin, was also released separately as a soundtrack.

== Add-ons and modifications ==
=== Maxis releases ===
Following SimCity 4's release, several add-ons and development kits were made available on its official site.

New landmarks, including Rockefeller Center, the Brandenburg Gate, and Stonehenge were made available online. Later, landmarks were primarily used to demonstrate the capability of Gmax and the Building Architect Tool (BAT) around the time of the BAT's release.

The Terrain Generator tool allowed users to create maps based on any of the 48 contiguous United States. The maps are based on data collected by the United States Geological Survey.

The Building Architect Tool (BAT) is a suite of tools developed for producing custom buildings. The suite consists of three applications: The Building Architect game pack for Gmax, which enabled users to render Gmax models into SimCity 4 sprites or props to be imported into the LE; an updated version of the LE; and the standalone Plug-in Manager, which enables users to modify simulation properties for new lots. Several modified versions have been released that have, in effect, served as bug fixes for various problems that had not been discovered before the initial release. First released in February 2004, it enabled the modding community to produce custom buildings and props for SC4. SimCity 4's Building Architect Tool is similar in function to SimCity 3000's Building Architect Tool and SimCity 2000's Urban Renewal Kit; however, previous programs of this kind were created from scratch by Maxis and used completely different interfaces. The SC4 BAT required a third-party application (Gmax) to function and was never bundled with SC4's or the Rush Hour expansion pack, as SimCity 3000 Unlimited had with its own BAT.

The Lot Editor (LE) is a tool which allows users to edit or design lots for SimCity 4 using available props. Because it was released several months before the BAT as a stand-alone version, users at the time were only capable of producing lots that consisted of built-in props from SC4. The BAT provided users with an updated version of the LE, which rendered the original LE utility obsolete. However, the old version is still made available in the official site.

=== Third-party content ===
In addition to official tools, third-party programs were released for further accessibility in editing SimCity 4 contents, potentially allowing users to change the nature of the game itself. Following the release of the Lot Editor and the "BAT" (Building Architect Tool), the majority of add-ons in circulation consist of user-created content; most are buildings and lots, including real-life landmarks, chain stores, extra houses, etc., while others include cosmetic changes for terrain, flora, custom vehicles and modifications in the game's behavior. Some even fundamentally change the mechanics of the game (for instance, by introducing multi-function transportation networks and stations, or by modifying the distance Sims are willing to walk in order to reach transit or their jobs). In some cases, both the skills of lot building and modding are combined, producing lots that are capable of affecting a city in a variety of ways. Some third-party content is only available to those with expansion packs or another mod.

The game's modding community, continuing for more than two decades after its release, has received attention for its longevity and vastness of content.

== Reception ==
=== Sales ===
In the United Kingdom, SimCity 4 sold over 100,000 units during the first half of 2003. This made it the United Kingdom's third-best-selling computer game for the period, or eighth across all platforms. At the time, Kristan Reed of GamesIndustry.biz wrote that its performance proved "you can still have big hits on PC". By the end of the year, British sales of the game had reached 105,000 units, which made it 79th-biggest seller across all platforms that year. The game later received a "Gold" sales award from the Entertainment and Leisure Software Publishers Association (ELSPA), indicating sales of at least 200,000 copies in the United Kingdom. Its Deluxe edition earned a "Silver" award from ELSPA, for at least 100,000 sales.

=== Reviews and awards ===
Reception

Aggregate scores
Aggregator	Score
GameRankings	85.23%
Metacritic	84/100

Review scores
Publication	Score
1Up.com	B+
GameSpot	8.1/10
GameSpy	75/100
IGN	9.2/10
Inside Mac Games	7.25/10

Awards
Publication	Award
	IGN: Editors' Choice
	Parents' Choice Foundation: Parents' Choice Award

Shortly after its release, the PC version of SimCity 4 garnered mainly positive reviews, gaining 84/100 from Metacritic, and an 85.09% overall score from GameRankings.

The game got a 9.2/10 rating at IGN, calling it a "major evolutionary step in the series". The review commented that the addition of the region view mode adds more depth to SimCity 4 and that the gameplay has a "more accurate representation of city planning and maintenance" than of previous titles in the SimCity series.

The game scored an 8.1/10 rating at GameSpot, stating that the game had a "sleek, attractive interface" and "great audio"; it added however that SimCity 4 was "rather rushed" and that the MySim mode "seems like an afterthought." The review concluded that it was a "complex and detailed strategy game," "though not as polished as it could have been." The publication later named it the best computer game of January 2003.

GameSpy gave the game a score of 75/100, commenting that SimCity 4 is "graphically stunning"; the review also criticized the game for having issues "that will likely kill the game for casual players" including performance and difficulty.

1UP rated the game at B+ and praised the region view feature as well as the detail of the graphics which create a "deeper sense of simulation." The review however criticized SimCity 4 for suffering crashes and performance issues.

SimCity 4 received further reviews after the release of the Mac version. The game received a rating of 7.25/10 from InsideMacGames. The review commented that the regional gameplay was a "new and welcome addition" and that it had detailed and realistic graphics; it was also said however that the game was not "revolutionary," had "horrendous bugs," and that the tutorial and manual lacked information.

Urban planner Jeff Speck said that SimCity 4's traffic model is "more advanced than what most traffic engineers use in real life".

=== Awards ===
SimCity 4 was chosen as one of IGN's "Editors' Choice" games for January 2003. It was also given the Parents' Choice Award by the Parents' Choice Foundation.

== Additional content and releases ==
=== SimCity 4: Rush Hour ===
On September 22, 2003, Maxis released an expansion pack for SimCity 4 dubbed Rush Hour. The expansion pack enhances the range of transportation facilities available to the player, such as being able to build four-lane avenues and elevated rail networks, as well as allowing them to trace traffic flow, while also allowing them to construct larger civic facilities; some such facilities have greater capacities, but all have increased maintenance costs. Additional features with the expansion also included the ability to control vehicles, take on missions that can unlock reward buildings much faster, affect their rating with the city and sometimes acquire a cash bonus, and introduced the ability to change between four architectural styles - three of these focus on architectural styles of American cities of differing eras, while the fourth introduces a new range of contemporary European-inspired architecture.

On the same day that the expansion pack Rush Hour was released, a bundle pack combining both the main game and the expansion pack was released, entitled SimCity 4 Deluxe Edition. On August 25, 2004, Aspyr Media released SimCity 4 Deluxe Edition for Mac OS X.

A year later, the expansion was released for Mac OS X on September 4, 2004.

=== Digital distribution release ===
On July 20, 2010, Electronic Arts released the Deluxe Edition (SimCity 4 and its Rush Hour expansion) for digital download on Steam, a digital distribution service by Valve. The game is also available on GOG.com, Direct2Drive and Impulse as well as EA's own Origin service. On April 10, 2014, Aspyr released an updated version of their port of the Deluxe Edition on the Mac App Store. The updated version includes bug fixes and performance enhancements, native resolution support, and support for the latest versions of Mac OS X.

=== EA digital storefront controversy ===
Around 2014, it was discovered that the copy of SimCity 4 sold on EA's own digital distribution platforms (Origin and later the EA App) was an outdated "digital version" that had a different checksum, rendering the game unpatchable even by Maxis' own update utilities. This version of the game lacked the stability and modding capabilities compared to those sold on other platforms, such as Steam or GOG.com. Following a small outcry from the SimCity 4 community on August 27, 2014, EA pushed an update that replaced the SimCity executable with the one being distributed on other platforms. However, on February 5, 2017, SimCity community members reported that their copy was once again downgraded to the unpatchable "digital version," to which EA provided no explanation. During this duration, the SimCity 4 storefront page utilized screenshots containing community-made mods which were impossible to use on this version of the game. On June 1, 2023, EA once again upgraded the game to the version sold on other platforms.

=== Future updates ===
SimCity kind of worked itself into a corner, [because] we were still appealing to this core SimCity group. It had gotten a little complicated for people who had never played SimCity. We want to take it back to its roots where somebody who had never heard of SimCity can pick it up and enjoy playing it without thinking it was really, really hard.

— Will Wright

Will Wright stated in an interview on May 16, 2003, that there would probably be more expansion packs after Rush Hour, but none were ever released. In another interview on May 22, 2004, Wright stated that Maxis was attempting to work out a "new direction" for SimCity after new versions had become "steadily more complex".

Two SimCity games for PC have followed SimCity 4. The first was SimCity Societies, which was developed by Tilted Mill Entertainment and released on November 13, 2007. The second was SimCity, which was announced in March 2012 and was released in March 2013.

== In popular culture ==
During the Republican presidential primaries of 2012, candidate Herman Cain's 9-9-9 taxation proposal was widely attributed to a similar tax structure presented in SimCity 4; the CNBC cable networks relayed the story of the linkage of the SimCity "ideal parameters" as a possible origin of the taxation proposal (the story itself may have originated in the technical press), but Cain denied any link to the game.
