= Endzone: A World Apart =

2021 video game

- Developer: Gentlymad Studios
- Publisher: Assemble Entertainment
- Composer: Jonas Albrecht
- Engine: Unity
- Platforms: Microsoft Windows, PlayStation 5, Xbox Series X/S
- Release: Windows; March 18, 2021; PlayStation 5, Xbox Series X/S; May 19, 2022
- Genre: City-building
- Mode: Single-player

Endzone: A World Apart is a city-building game developed by Gentlymad Studios. Players control a post-apocalyptic settlement that struggles to survive in an irradiated land. A sequel, Endzone 2, was released in 2025.

== Gameplay ==
After a nuclear disaster, the survivors retreat to underground shelters, where they live for generations. Players control a settlement established by the former inhabitants of one of these shelters. Players need to acquire food and water while dealing with radiation and destructive dust storms.

== Development ==
Endzone was developed in Germany. Gentlymad were influenced by Anno 1800, Banished, and Frostpunk. The game entered early access in April 2020 and was released in March 2021. Under the subtitle Survivor Edition, it was ported to PlayStation 5 and Xbox Series X and S in May 2022. Two DLCs have been released: "Prosperity", which adds luxury resources, and "Distant Places", which adds additional exploration options. The Survivor Edition includes the "Prosperity" DLC.

== Reception ==
The PC version of Endzone: A World Apart received mixed reviews on Metacritic. Reviewing the game while in early access, Jonathan Bolding of PC Gamer said that the game's difficulty distinguishes it from other city-building games. Rob Zacny of Vice recommended the game to people who enjoy micromanagement. He praised the game's balanced survival mechanics, which allow colonies to thrive but are a constant, deadly threat. In a review for Gamepressure, Alexander Eriksen rated it 8/10 stars and wrote, "Sound design, user experience, and gameplay all just flow and make for an enjoyable, if a bit laidback, experience."
