= Planetbase =

2015 video game

- Developer: Madruga Works
- Publisher: Madruga Works
- Producer: Martiño Figueroa
- Designer: Martiño Figueroa
- Programmer: Martiño Figueroa
- Artists: Tucho Fernandez, Sara Teramo
- Composer: Alexander Falinski
- Platforms: Microsoft Windows; OS X; PlayStation 4; Xbox One
- Release: Microsoft Windows; October 16, 2015; OS X; January 8, 2016; PS4; January 23, 2018; Xbox One; May 3, 2017
- Genres: Indie, simulation, strategy
- Mode: Single-player

Planetbase is a space simulation and strategy video game developed by Madruga Works which was released on October 16, 2015 for Microsoft Windows, and January 8, 2016 for OS X. The game involves establishing a human colony on a distant planet and building an outpost to survive on the planet.

== Gameplay ==
In the game, the player leads a group of space settlers who are trying to form a base on an isolated planet. The player is given the role of base architect as well as manager. It is up to the player to guide the colonists to build a self-sufficient base in a place where they can survive and can extract water easily, grow food for living and, most importantly, have a constant supply of oxygen. The colonists can be directed to mine different kinds of metal and manufacture robots.

A total of four different planets can be colonized, each with varying conditions and an increasing difficulty level. These planets are the Desert Planet, Frozen Planet, a Barren Moon, and Storm Planet. The player must manage the flow of new colonists coming to the colony and make sure that only those with some useful skills travel to the planet. The most useful colonists are engineers, workers, and guards.

Robots can be constructed to complete the more monotonous tasks. The survival of the colony is challenged by natural disasters like sandstorms, solar flares, blizzards, and meteors. There are 29 different structures to be built, five types of human workers, and three types of robots. There are 10 milestones to be completed and eight techs that can be bought from traders.

== Reception ==
The game scored a 70 out of 100 based on reviews from four critics on Metacritic.

== See also ==
- Aven Colony
- Dawn of Man
- Space Colony
- Surviving Mars
- Planetbase 2
