= SimCity =

Video game franchise

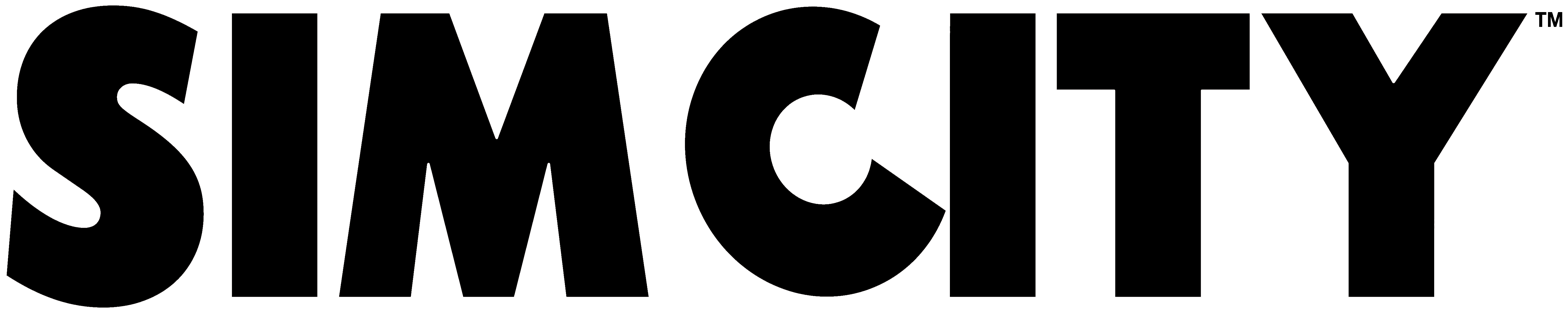
- SimCity series logo (2012–present)
- Genres: Construction and management simulation, city-building
- Developers: Maxis, Tilted Mill, Aspyr Media, Full Fat, Infogrames, Nintendo EAD, Babaroga, HAL Laboratory, Track Twenty
- Publishers: Electronic Arts, Broderbund, Maxis, Nintendo, Superior Software, Acornsoft, Infogrames, Zoo Digital Publishing
- Creator: Will Wright
- Platforms: Windows, Linux, Mac, Wii, PlayStation, Nintendo 64, Nintendo 64DD, Nintendo DS, Saturn, PlayStation 3, Palm OS, Archimedes, Acorn Electron, Amiga, CDTV, Amstrad CPC, Atari ST, BBC Micro, Commodore 64, DESQview, MS-DOS, EPOC32, FM Towns, iOS, Android, PC-98, Game Boy Advance, OLPC XO-1, OS/2, NeWS, Browser, Super NES, Tk, Unix, X11 TCL, ZX Spectrum
- First release: SimCity; February 2, 1989
- Latest release: SimCity: BuildIt; December 16, 2014
- Spin-offs: SimFarm, SimTown, Sim City: The Card Game, SimCopter, Streets of SimCity, SimsVille, The Sims

SimCity is an open-ended city-building video game franchise originally designed by Will Wright. The first game in the series, SimCity, was published by Maxis in 1989 and was followed by several sequels and many other spin-off Sim titles, including 2000's The Sims, which itself became a best-selling computer game and franchise. Maxis developed the series independently until 1997, and continued under the ownership of Electronic Arts (EA) until 2003. EA commissioned various spinoffs from other companies during the 2000s, focusing on console and mobile releases. A 2013 EA-Maxis reboot was subject to what has been described as "one of the most disastrous launches in history", which may have triggered the 2015 shutdown of Maxis Emeryville and the end of the franchise.

== Gameplay ==
SimCity titles are real-time management and construction simulators. Across most titles, the player (acting as mayor) is given a blank map to begin and must expand the city with the budget provided. As the city matures, the player may be able to add government and other special buildings (such as a mayor's house or courthouse), depending on how large the city is. Proper management of the city requires citizens to be provided with basic utilities (electricity, water and sometimes waste management) along with public services such as health, education, safety, parks and leisure facilities. These are provided by building relevant buildings or infrastructure, with each building covering a circular "range" in its vicinity. Inadequate funding of these services can lead to strikes or even urban decline.

The primary source of income is taxation, though some income can be generated by legalizing gambling or placing certain "special" buildings such as military bases or prisons. The player may make deals with neighboring cities to sell or buy services, as long as a connection is made to the neighbor for that service, such as electricity cables. The player may have to deal with disasters, such as fires and tornadoes, or fictional crises such as monster attacks. SimCity titles are predominantly single-player games, with a few exceptions, including the "Network Edition" of SimCity 2000, the Unix port of the original SimCity, and SimCity (2013). SimCity 4 provided a limited form of multiplayer gaming with the ability to share regional maps and cities with other players, allowing players to collaborate, but not to interact in real-time gameplay.

Depending on the title, there may scenarios with city performance-related goals and time limits in which to complete them.

== Development history ==
Release timeline Main series in bold
1989	**SimCity**
1990
1991
1992
1993	**SimCity 2000**
1993	SimFarm
1994
1995	SimTown
1996	SimCopter
1997	Streets of SimCity
1998
1999	**SimCity 3000**
2000	SimCity 64
2001
2002
2003	**SimCity 4**
2003	SimCity 4: Rush Hour
2004
2005
2006
2007	SimCity DS
2007	SimCity Societies
2008	SimCity Creator (DS)
2008	SimCity Creator (Wii)
2009
2010
2011
2012	SimCity Social
2013	**SimCity**
2013	SimCity: Cities of Tomorrow
2014	SimCity: BuildIt

=== Under independent development (1985–1997) ===
The black-and-white version of SimCity on the Mac. Most other releases were in color, but had a similar interface.

Development of the original SimCity began in 1985 under game designer Will Wright, and the game was published in 1989. Wright was inspired by a map creation feature of the game Raid on Bungeling Bay that led him to discover that he enjoyed creating maps more than playing the actual game. While developing SimCity, Wright cultivated a love of the intricacies and theories of urban planning and acknowledged the influence of Jay Wright Forrester's book Urban Dynamics. In addition, Wright was inspired by reading "The Seventh Sally", a short story by Stanisław Lem from The Cyberiad, published in the collection The Mind's I, in which an engineer encounters a deposed tyrant, and creates a miniature city with artificial citizens for the tyrant to oppress.

The first version of the game was developed for the Commodore 64 under the working title Micropolis. The game represented an unusual paradigm in computer gaming, in that it could neither be won nor lost; as a result, game publishers did not believe it was possible to market and sell such a game successfully. Broderbund declined to publish the title when Wright proposed it, and he pitched it to a range of major game publishers without success. Founder Jeff Braun of then-tiny Maxis agreed to publish SimCity as one of two initial games for the company. Wright and Braun returned to Broderbund to formally clear the rights to the game in 1988, when SimCity was near completion. Broderbund executives Gary Carlston and Don Daglow saw that the title was infectious and fun, and signed Maxis to a distribution deal for both of its initial games. With that, four years after initial development, SimCity was released for the Amiga and Macintosh platforms, followed by the IBM PC and Commodore 64 later in 1989.

SimCity was released in 1990 on the ZX Spectrum 48K and 128K by Infogrames. The 1991 SNES port was very similar to the original edition but had some unique features, including Reward buildings, a Mario statue and possible attacks by a giant Bowser.

The unexpected and enduring success of the original SimCity, combined with other "Sim" titles' relative lack of success at the time, motivated the development of a sequel. SimCity 2000 released in 1993 with an isometric view instead of overhead. Underground layers were introduced for water pipes and subways, along with many new buildings, more elaborate financial controls and many other improvements.

=== Continued releases under Electronic Arts (1997–2003) ===
Maxis was purchased by Electronic Arts in 1997, and the company would gain control of the SimCity brand. Will Wright continued to work at the company, moving on to work on The Sims, with development on future SimCity titles being led by other Maxis staff such as Christine McGavran. The next title, SimCity 3000 was released in 1999. It introduced many features, including waste management, agriculture, business deals and expanded inter-city relations. The game maintained the pseudo-isometric dimetric perspective of its predecessor, though the landscape became more complex and colorful.

The Japanese exclusive SimCity 64 was released in 2000 and featured the ability to view the city at night, pedestrian level free-roaming, and individual road vehicles and pedestrians (which could only be seen while in the free-roaming mode). Cities in the game were also presented in 3D hybrid graphics, a first for the franchise.

SimCity 4 was released on January 14, 2003. Among various changes, cities were now located in regions, which were divided into individual segments. Each region represents the metropolitan area of a city, while individual segment maps represented districts. The zoning system was updated, and buildings were classified into several wealth levels, types, and building size stages, which were affected by the region's population and condition. Urban decay and gentrification were simulated with buildings deteriorating or improving accordingly. Residents and neighborhoods were transferrable between SimCity 4 and The Sims 2.

=== Societies and portable spinoffs (2007–2011) ===
After the release of SimCity 4, EA had Tilted Mill Entertainment develop the next major title in the franchise, rather than Maxis. The group developed SimCity Societies (2007), which was significantly different from prior games, owing to a small-scale social engineering focus and less detailed simulation. Rather than placing zones, buildings were constructed individually for example, similar to Monte Cristo's game City Life. Six "social energies", called societal values, allowed players to learn about the characteristics of the citizens. Cities behaviour responded to the energies the players chose and the reward system from SimCity 2000 returned. The game was met with mixed reviews. Wright, at the time developing Spore, later commented on the move away from Maxis: "I didn't have anything to do with that decision. Honestly, I didn't even play Societies. I read some of the reviews of it, though."

SimCity DS, a heavily modified version of SimCity 3000, was released that year. The game made use of the handheld's dual screen to display additional interfaces at once. System specific features were prominent, such as the microphone, which was used to blow out fires, and the touch screen, which was used to control the interface. A 2008 sequel introduced a challenge mode in which players guided their city through different historical periods. For instance, the player could create a medieval city, or a pre-historic city.

On January 10, 2008, the source code of the original game was released under the free software GPL 3 license. The release of the source code was related to the donation of SimCity software to the One Laptop Per Child laptop, as one of the principles of the OLPC laptop is the use of free and open source software. The open source version was called Micropolis, since EA retained the trademark SimCity.

SimCity Creator for the Wii was announced on February 12, 2008. The title featured the ability to directly draw roads and train tracks on the ground using the pointer function of the Wii Remote, as well as several customizable themes for the city's buildings. It was released worldwide in September 2008.

The late 2000s and early 2010s also saw several games re-released for mobile devices. This included SimCity 3000 (2008), SimCity Deluxe (2010), and SimCity 4 for Blackberry playbook (2011).

=== Reboot (2013) ===
SimCity's fifth major release was announced on March 5, 2012, for Windows and Mac OS X by Maxis at the "game changers" event. Titled SimCity, it was a dramatic departure from previous SimCity games, featuring full 3D graphics, online multiplayer gameplay, the new Glassbox engine, as well as many other feature and gameplay changes. Director Ocean Quigley discussed issues that occurred during the development of the title, which stemmed from two conflicting visions coming from EA and Maxis. EA wanted to emphasize multiplayer, collaborative gameplay, with some of the simulation work conducted on remote servers, in part to combat piracy. In contrast, Maxis wanted to focus on graphical improvements with the new title. Quigley described the resultant title as a poor compromise between these two objectives- with only shallow multiplayer features, and a small city size limit- one quarter of the land area of previous titles in the franchise.

The game was released for Windows on March 5, 2013, and on Mac in August. Age of Awareness would later refer to the release as "one of the most disastrous launches in history". The game required a constant internet connection even during single-player activity, and server outages caused connection errors for many users. Multiplayer elements were "shallow at best", with departing players leaving abandoned cities behind in public regions. Users were unable to save their game- with the servers instead intended to handle this- and so when users were disconnected they would often lose hours of progress. The game was also plagued by numerous bugs, which persisted long after launch.

The title was heavily criticized in user reviews, and developer plans for post-launch updates were scrapped. EA announced that they would offer a free game from their library to all those who bought SimCity as compensation for the problems, and they concurred that the way the launch had been set up was "dumb". As a result of this problem, Amazon temporarily stopped selling the game in the week after release. The always-online requirement, even in single play, was highly criticised, particularly after gamers determined that the internet connection requirement could be easily removed. An offline mode was subsequently made available by EA in March 2014, and a mobile port entitled SimCity: BuildIt was released later that year.

It has been suggested that the poor performance of SimCity was responsible for the 2015 closure of Maxis' Emeryville studios, and the end of the franchise.

== Spin-offs ==
During the 1990s a large number of games were developed under the "Sim" nomenclature started by Maxis in 1989. This list includes only spin-offs that directly relate to SimCity.

=== Sim City: The Card Game (1995) ===
Sim City: The Card Game is an out-of-print collectible card game based on the video game SimCity. It was released in 1995 by Mayfair Games. Several city expansions followed, adding location and politician cards from various cities including: Chicago, Washington, New York City, and Atlanta. A Toronto expansion was planned but never released. Allen Varney of The Duelist said it offers "fine solitaire play" and that the game eventually offered stand-alone city sets.

=== SimTown (1995) ===
SimTown is a 1995 video game published by Maxis, much like SimCity but on a smaller scale. SimTown allows the player to construct a town consisting of streets, houses, businesses and parks and control the people in it. SimTown was targeted more towards children.

=== SimCopter (1996) ===
SimCopter puts the player in the role of a helicopter pilot. There are two modes of play: free mode and career mode. The free mode lets the player import and fly through imported SimCity 2000 cities or any of the 30 cities supplied with the game. However, user cities sometimes need to be designed with SimCopter in mind, and most of the time the player must increase the number of police stations, fire stations, and hospitals to allow for speedier dispatches. The second mode—the heart of the game—is the career mode. This puts the player in the shoes of a pilot doing various jobs around the city. The game is notable for being the debut of the Simlish language.

The game gained controversy when a designer named Jacques Servin inserted sprites of shirtless "himbos" (male bimbos) in Speedo trunks who hugged and kissed each other and appeared in great numbers from time to time. The easter egg was caught shortly after release and removed from future copies of the game.

=== Streets of SimCity (1997) ===
Streets of SimCity is a 1997 racing and vehicular combat computer game published by Maxis. One of the game's main attractions was the ability to explore any cities created in SimCity 2000 by car in a cinematic style. The game, like SimCopter, is in full 3D and the player's vehicle can be controlled using a keyboard, a joystick, or a gamepad. Another notable feature is the game's network mode, in which players can play deathmatches with up to seven other individuals. It is one of the few games in the Maxis series that Will Wright did not work on, and the last Maxis game to be developed and released without supervision by Electronic Arts (which acquired Maxis in 1997 and "assisted" development of Maxis games thereafter).

=== The Sims franchise (2000–present) ===
Originating as a spinoff, The Sims quickly evolved into one of the most successful video game franchises of all time. Early releases retained a level of interconnectivity with SimCity, such as the ability to transfer neighborhoods from SimCity 4 to The Sims 2. A crossover title, SimsVille, was earmarked for 2001 and would have allowed the player to build cities, as well as make Sims and control them. The game was cancelled so that Maxis could focus on development for The Sims Online and SimCity 4.

=== SimCityEDU (2013) ===
SimCityEDU: Pollution Challenge! is an educational version of SimCity designed by GlassLab.

== Reception ==
Aggregate review scores As of September 14, 2021.
Game	GameRankings	Metacritic
SimCity (1989)	(SNES) 77	—
SimCity 2000	(PC) 72	—
SimCity 3000	(PC) 83	(PC) 77
SimCity 4	(PC) 85	(PC) 84
SimCity Societies	(PC) 72	(PC) 63
SimCity (2013)	(PC) 63	(PC) 64

The first two games were well received and sold well during the 1990s, with the franchise achieving a total of 5 million sales by 1999. SimCity 2000 in particular was among the highest selling games of the 1990s, and in 2018 was featured at #86 of IGN's top 100 video games of all time. SimCity 4 (2003) marked the high point in the franchise's GameRankings score at 85. The 2013 reboot was very poorly received, with Green Man Gaming comparing its effect on the franchise to the destruction of the city of Pompeii.

== Criticism ==
The SimCity franchise has often been criticized for both the content of its underlying mathematical models (most of which were drawn from Jay Forrester's Urban Dynamics) and for keeping them obfuscated to promote an image of "realism". The mathematical models are built on certain premises such as low taxes promoting growth and simply adding police stations reducing crime nearby, which may not be the case. Sociologist Paul Starr wrote he was "worried that the game’s underlying code was an 'unreachable black box' which could 'seduce' players into accepting its assumptions." Certain players have pushed the limits of those "black box" algorithms and found that the game's metrics for success (crime rates, economic growth) do not include things such as public health and citizen happiness.

Will Wright stated in an interview with Tristan Donovan that "SimCity was always meant to be a caricature of the way a city works, not a realistic model of the way a city works." Despite that, the series was still marketed as being 'realistic', with the tagline for SimCity 2000 reading "If this game was any more realistic, it’d be illegal to turn it off!" There have been several examples of real-world politicians having their city planning policies tested in SimCity, with the assumption that its models are realistic. Prominent politicians who have been "tested" through SimCity include former mayor of Warsaw and president of Poland Lech Kaczyński, former mayor of Providence, Rhode Island Buddy Cianci, and German Bundestag members Lars Klingbeil, Dorothee Bär, and Jimmy Schulz.

== Legacy ==
The franchise has been credited with inspiring a generation of urban planners, transport officials, and local government figures, who experienced the games at a younger age and took on those careers in later life. Various editions of the game have been used in education to simulate urban planning for students in elementary through college classes.

While there were a handful of city-building games before 1989, SimCity popularized the genre and laid the groundwork for many titles inspired by it, including Cities: Skylines (2015), which was greenlit after the poor reception of the reboot. More broadly, the lack of a win condition in favor of open-ended play was a novelty at the time that gave rise to Maxis' "software toys" design concept, which influenced many other titles from the company.

== See also ==
- List of city-building video games
