= City-building game =

Video game genre

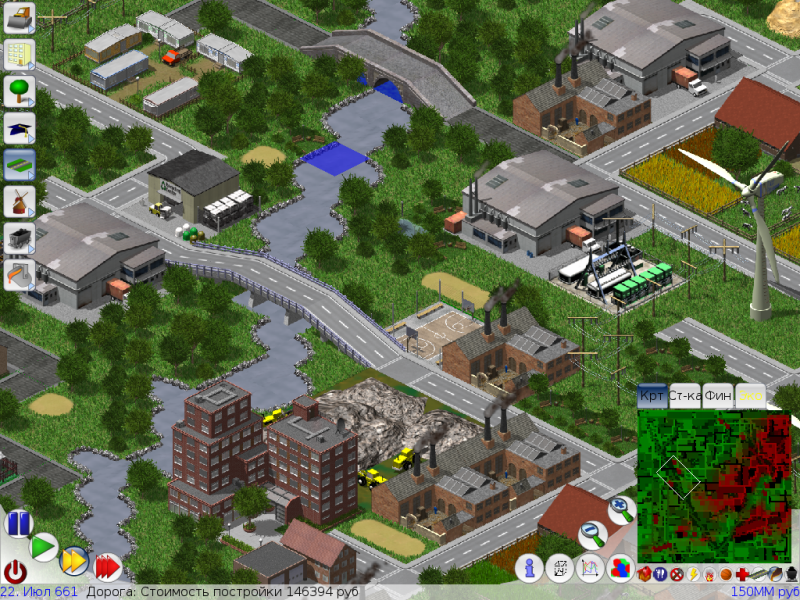
Lincity is a city-building game.

A city-building game, citybuilder or town-building game, is a genre of simulation video game where players act as the overall planner and leader of a city or town, looking down on it from above, and being responsible for its growth and management strategy. Players choose building placement and city management features such as salaries and work priorities, and the city develops accordingly.

City-building games such as SimCity, Cities XXL or Cities: Skylines are considered a type of construction and management simulation.

== History ==
=== Early examples ===
The earliest city-building game was The Sumerian Game (1964), a text-based mainframe game written by Mabel Addis, based on the ancient Sumerian city of Lagash. It was subsequently adapted into The Sumer Game (1968), later known as Hamurabi. The first sim game, Utopia (1982) developed for the Mattel Intellivision console system, covered many of these same elements, but was limited by the primitive screen resolutions of its era. Unlike the thousands of individual spaces possible a few years later in SimCity, each island in Utopia held only 29 "buildable" spaces for schools, factories and other constructions. The player's score was based on the well-being of his people.

=== Beginnings of the genre ===
The city-building game genre was established in 1989 with SimCity, which emphasized continuous building rather than a set victory condition. Players followed personal preferences in design and growth. Indicators of success were maintaining positive budget balance and citizen satisfaction. While "SimCity" was independently developed by Will Wright, beginning in 1985; the game was not released until 1989. Because the game lacked any arcade or action elements that dominated the video game market in the 1980s, video game publishers declined to release the title for fear of its commercial failure until Broderbund eventually agreed to distribute it. SimCity was a financial success, selling one million copies by late 1992, including 500,000 for home computers and another 500,000 for the SNES. In the United States, it was the ninth best-selling computer game from 1993 to 1999, with another 830,000 units sold. The SNES version sold 1.98 million units worldwide, including 900,000 units in Japan. Subsequent SimCity titles such as SimCity 4 soon followed when high sales of the game demonstrated its popularity. SimCity inspired a new genre of video games. "Software toys" that were open-ended with no set objective were developed trying to duplicate SimCity's success. The most successful was Wright's own The Sims, which went on to be the best selling computer game of all time. The ideas pioneered in SimCity have been incorporated into real-world applications as well, as urban developers have recognized that the game's design was "gamification" of city planning by integrating numerous real-world systems for a city or region interacted to project growth or change. Several real-world city improvement projects started with models inspired by SimCity prior to implementation, particularly with the onset of more connected smart cities.

=== Later popularity ===
1992 and 1993 saw the release of various games. Impressions Games was a British video game developer which created a series of historical city-building games starting from a blockbuster game which modeled cities in ancient Rome: Caesar. These games swapped radius-based “coverage” for agents (“walkers”; market ladies, priests, barbers, who physically deliver services along streets. The focus was now on street topology (loops, gates, choke points) and housing evolution (meeting tiered needs). Those games followed the style of Sim City over historical accuracy, such as including schools and hospitals, but not slavery.

In 1993, The Settlers, which is set in medieval times and simulates a complex settlement and commerce system, which was revolutionary at the time. The Settlers turns the commerce into a watchable machine: woodcutter → sawmill → planks → building. Later entries add territory control and quality-of-life dashboards, but the core feature was observing supply lines.

In 1994, Transport Tycoon was released, which focused on building bus, train, tram, and boat routes. Since its release, an open source updated version called Open Transport Tycoon Deluxe (or OpenTTD).

The PC game Stronghold developed by Stormfront Studios, also appeared in 1993, and was advertised as "SimCity meets Dungeons & Dragons in 3D". Elves, humans and dwarves each built neighborhoods with unique architecture within the player's town. The title also had elements of real-time strategy games when enemies attacked the city, and the line between city-building and RTS games has often been blurred with this kind of hybrid title. True 3D graphics were not yet possible at that time, so the advertised 3D was actually a clever use of 2D graphics (an isometric projection) with mathematically generated terrain and overlaid bitmaps and sprites.

The Anno series started in 1998 with the release of Anno 1602 and established a high level of detail in graphics as well as an intense commerce simulation and a distinct gameplay. Players juggle multi-island networks, shipping lanes, population classes with escalating needs, and specialization pressures (expeditions, influence, diplomacy). It blends resource micro-management with macro-level logistics, evolving over time to incorporate futuristic and industrial-age settings.

=== Diversification ===
In 2001, 3 games with different ideas were released. Tropico wrapped elections, factions, foreign meddling, edicts, coups in a Caribbean satire. The win condition is often just staying in office by designing a system that pleases enough people sufficiently. In Startopia, players build a space station on stacked decks (Engineering, Pleasure, Bio) with alien needs, commerce, and research. Stronghold (unrelated to the previous game) developed by Firefly Studios fused commerce with siege warfare. Food rations, fear factor, and wall geometry matter as much as troop numbers. Layout and supply lines are now military decisions too.

SimCity 4, released in 2003, was praised as a standard-setter among city-builders and is still regarded by Matt Smith of Makeuseof.com as one of the best games in the genre, despite its complexity and steep learning curve. Subsequent games in the series attempted to remedy this, such as SimCity Societies (2007), which did not further deepen the gameplay along the line of city simulation but incorporates different gameplay elements such as social management. The changes to the formula polarized critics and its fan base alike. The reboot, SimCity, released in 2013, attempted to bring the franchise back to its roots but was panned by critics and traditional fans for its forced online requirements, consistent server issues at launch, bugs in the simulation, failure to add promised features and restrictions on city sizes, all of which ultimately led to the discontinuation of SimCity as a franchise. The waning dominance of the SimCity franchise in the genre caused several other companies to release similarly themed games, like Cities XL (2009).

Children of the Nile from ex-Impressions games employees pivoted from random walkers to household AI: named citizens with routines whose daily errands are essential for commerce .

Starting with Anno 2070 in 2011, continued by Anno 2205 in 2015, and emphasized by Surviving Mars and Frostpunk in 2018, futurist settings became again widely popular with the audience of the genre.

With the rise of social gaming, mobile gaming, freemium and micropayment model in the 2010s, there has been a surge of casual city-building games with different mechanisms like time-based "produce and upgrade" feature, including CityVille, SimCity Buildit, and City Island. Although most traditional followers of the genre dislike these games due to factors like simple, dumbed-down mechanics and microtransactions, they have gained greater commercial success around the world than most prior city building games.

Banished released in 2014, kick-started the survival-citybuilder trend with harsh seasons, demographics, and food security issues.

=== 2015 onwards ===
The game Cities: Skylines published in 2015 and was very successful with the audience of the genre. It revived the SimCity style with big maps, traffic fidelity, districts & policies, and day-one modding that turned the game into a platform (Traffic Manager: PE, 81 Tiles, thousands of assets). Cities: Skylines was followed up by a sequel, Cities: Skylines II, which released in October 2023.

Planetbase, Aven Colony, Frostpunk, RimWorld, Surviving Mars, Endzone: A World Apart, Against the Storm, Workers & Resources: Soviet Republic, Foundation, and The Wandering Village are some of the notable games which came out in this period.

== See also ==
- Business simulation game – Video game genre
- Construction and management simulation – Video game subgenre
- Comprehensive planning – Long-term large-area public policy developmental plan
- Development plan – UK local land use planning
- Government simulation game
- Outline of transport planning
- Simulation game
- Traffic simulation
