= School of the Art Institute of Chicago =

Private art school in Chicago, Illinois

- Former names: Chicago Academy of Design; Chicago Academy of Fine Arts
- Type: Private art school
- Established: 1866; 160 years ago
- Parent institution: Art Institute of Chicago
- Accreditation: HLC; NASAD
- Affiliations: AICAD
- Endowment: $1.6 billion (2025)
- President: Jiseon Lee Isbara
- Provost: Martin Berger
- Faculty: 141 full-time 427 part-time
- Students: 3,640 (fall 2024)
- Undergraduates: 2,806
- Postgraduates: 589
- Location: Chicago, Illinois, United States; 41°52′46″N 87°37′26″W
- Campus: Urban
- Website: saic.edu

The School of the Art Institute of Chicago (SAIC) is the private art school of the Art Institute of Chicago (AIC) in Chicago, Illinois.

Tracing its history to an art students' cooperative founded in 1866, which grew into the museum and school, SAIC has been accredited since 1936 by the Higher Learning Commission and by the National Association of Schools of Art and Design since 1944 (charter member). It has been a member of the Association of Independent Colleges of Art and Design (AICAD) since the association's founding in 1991 and is also accredited by the National Architectural Accrediting Board.

Its downtown Chicago campus consists of seven buildings located in the immediate vicinity of the AIC building. SAIC is in an equal partnership with the AIC and shares many administrative resources such as construction, and human resources. The campus, located in the Loop, comprises chiefly five main buildings: the MacLean Center (112 S Michigan Ave), the Michigan building (116 S Michigan Ave), the Sharp (36 S Wabash Ave), Sullivan Center (37 S Wabash Ave), and the Columbus (280 S Columbus Dr). SAIC used to hold classes in the Spertus building at 610 S Michigan Ave. SAIC owns and rents additional buildings throughout Chicago that are used as student galleries or investments. There are three dormitory facilities: The Buckingham, Jones Hall, and 162 N State Street residencies.

== History ==
=== Founding and predecessor (1866–1882) ===
The institute was preceded by the Chicago Academy of Design, established by local artists in 1866 in rented rooms on Clark Street. Its president was the sculptor Leonard Wells Volk. Financed by member dues and patron donations, the school moved into its own building on Adams Street in 1870, planned and constructed by its member artists–largely educated and culturally engaged–to serve as a home for the arts, and for those pursuing art as a profession. Its 18 studios, a spacious gallery, and lecture room supported three founding ideals: training in artistic discipline, a gallery open at all times to display the best works, and a venue to host specialized and general lectures. The building and any assets that could not be saved were destroyed by the Great Chicago Fire of 1871.

By the mid-1870s, the Eugene Pike building at State and Monroe Streets was the main site for the school, studios, and exhibitions. The Long Depression had set in, however, and financial and managerial conflicts hampered efforts to revive the academy. As it struggled, Volk resigned, and in 1876, ten business leaders were elected to form a board of trustees, while artists retained control of exhibitions and the school. Later that year, amendments granted the trustees full authority and by December 1877 the board was drawn entirely from business leaders and art-committee-member associates of the Interstate Industrial Exposition—an annual trade fair celebrating Chicago's post-fire commercial recovery—with no artists among them.

In May 1879, the trustees engineered a bankruptcy and arranged the sale of the academy's assets at a sheriff's auction for a nominal sum to satisfy unpaid debts. They then incorporated a new entity, the Chicago Academy of Fine Arts with a charter that added art collecting to the predecessor's founding aims of education and exhibitions. It acquired the former academy's school furniture, plaster casts, art equipment, and other resources that had been sold days before. They went on to operate in the same building, with many of the same resources and students.

=== Early school (1882–1910s) ===
The artists of the original academy attempted to reopen in 1880 but were unable to meet teacher salaries. Meanwhile, the new Chicago Academy of Fine Arts was prospering; in the early 1880s it raised $60,000 and purchased land at the corner of Michigan and Van Buren for a permanent home designed by Burnham and Root (now the Chicago Club). In 1882, banker Charles L. Hutchinson was elected president, and the organization adopted a name that better reflected its dual role as both a school and a museum, The Art Institute of Chicago, with the following charter:

The founding and maintenance of schools of art and design, the preservation and exhibition of collections of art and the cultivation and extension of the arts of design by any appropriate means.

The original academy artists had kept their organization alive by meeting irregularly, holding on to their tax-exempt charter for 20 years until the Art Institute secured control of it in 1900. The new institution was growing regardless. A commission from Art Institute benefactor Florence Field and sculpted by Edward Kemeys, the pair of bronze Lions guarding the Art Institute on Michigan Avenue had been unveiled on May 10, 1894. A library funded by philanthropist Martin A. Ryerson and designed by Shepley, Rutan and Coolidge had opened for art students in 1901.

In its early years the school taught drawing from plaster casts of antique sculpture and from live models, using a detailed, meticulous drawing style. By 1882 enrollment increased to 300 and classes in decorative design, perspective drafting, lithography, and architecture were added to the curriculum. When the growth of newspapers after World War I created a new demand for illustrators, the school responded by adding a dedicated department, and the pragmatic nature of these courses attracted more men. Georgia O'Keeffe attended the school during the 1905-06 year, studying with figure drawing instructor John Vanderpoel. Iowan Grant Wood, another notable alumnus, attended the school from 1913–1916, taking evening classes in fine arts and metalworking while working at a local silversmithing shop.

=== Interwar years (1920s–1930s) ===
The interwar years brought both physical and cultural change to the institution. In 1924 and 1925, two additions were made to the complex in memory of officers who died during World War I: The George Alexander McKinlock Jr. Memorial Court designed by Coolidge & Hodgdon, and the Kenneth Sawyer Goodman Memorial Theatre, designed by Howard Van Doren Shaw.

The school's demographics were shifting along with its footprint. Since its founding the majority of students had been "genteel women," reflecting a societal association of fine art with female accomplishment. But the introduction of an industrial arts department drew more men to the school in the 1920s and Depression years. And from a single inspired basement class in the mid-1930s, a department of dress design emerged.

Among the fine arts students of that era were Chicagoans Ivan Albright (c.1920-1923) and Aaron Bohrod (c.1926-1928) each of whom had visited the Institute as a child.

=== Postwar (1940s–1950s) ===
After World War II, veterans studying on the G.I. Bill swelled the ranks of male students, and fine art was increasingly seen as a viable professional path. One sculpting professor recalled his GI students returning four assignments when he had asked for just one. Among those veterans was LeRoy Neiman who later taught at the school.

Over time, a divide had been forming between the museum and the school. While one prioritized connoisseurship, security, and order, the other valued student self-expression and freedom. Where early decades had seen respectful coexistence with art students regularly seen working in museum spaces, by the 1950s the relationship had soured. The museum questioned the school's existence and students felt unwelcome in the museum.

Added to this unrest was the broader spirit of abstract expressionism that was reshaping art education around the country yet unwelcome at an institution dedicated to preserving the work of earlier generations.

Art students in this era reflected its expanding range: Claes Oldenburg (c.1950-1954), Halston (c.1952), Richard Estes (c.1952-1956), Richard Hunt (c.1953–1957). Halston came for night classes in millinery, and would go on to found an American fashion empire. And Hunt, a Black sculptor, went on to become one of the most publicly commissioned artists in American history.

=== 1960s onward ===
Tensions came to a head in 1965 when students and faculty staged a two-month strike over the firing of dean Norman Boothby by the trustees. The dispute was resolved through concrete reforms: school representation on the board of trustees, clarified financial reporting, increased faculty salaries, the introduction of a tenure system, and a faculty handbook. Cramped quarters, another grievance aired during the strike, was fueled by a rumor that the school would be separated from the institute entirely–talk that quieted after building plans showed new space allocated to the school.

In the years following the strike, the school entered a period of creative and institutional expansion. Notable during this time is the founding of the Film Center in 1972; as is the school's Art & Technologies department that embraced pioneering areas of study from SAIC faculty, like electronics and kinetics (c.1969), generative systems (c.1970), holography (c.1976), bio art (c.1998), computer graphics and animation (c.late 1970s), robotics (c.1989), and virtual reality (c.2001).

Alumni of this era include the Chicago Imagists who emerged as a distinct voice in American art during the late 1960s through the 1970s. Also of note are the founders of the ARC Gallery and Artemisia Gallery, the first women artists' cooperatives in the Midwest and significant hubs for feminist theory by SAIC graduates who were responding to limited exhibition opportunities and male-dominated spaces.

Subsequent decades have brought further growth through the acquisition of landmark Chicago Loop properties to house departments, learning spaces, and studios.

== Leadership ==
Walter E. Massey served as president, from 2010 until July 2016. He was succeeded by Elissa Tenny, who formerly served as the school's provost. In 2024, Tenny was succeeded by Jiseon Lee Isbara, a fiber artist and academic administrator.

== Academics ==
Then faculty member Barbara Rossi leading a critique of student work in 2006.

SAIC offers classes in art and technology; arts administration; art history, theory, and criticism; art education and art therapy; ceramics; fashion design; filmmaking; historic preservation; architecture; interior architecture; designed objects; journalism; painting and drawing; performance; photography; printmaking; sculpture; sound; new media; video; visual communication; visual and critical studies; animation; illustration; fiber; and writing.

SAIC also offers an interdisciplinary Low-Residency MFA for students wishing to study the fine arts and/or writing.

In 2025, the school reported a six-year graduation rate of 67%.

== Chicago Architects Oral History Project ==
In 1983, the Department of Architecture began the Chicago Architects Oral History Project. More than 78 architects have contributed.

== Video Data Bank ==
The Video Data Bank was started at SAIC In 1976, "committed to fostering awareness and scholarship of the history and contemporary practice of video and media art." The Video Data Bank collection includes over 6,000 works of video art by over 600 artists. In November 2025, a wave of staff layoffs led to three of five staff positions at the Video Data Bank—including the organization's director—being cut due to changes in enrollment and federal contributions. According to founding director Kate Horsfield, it was formerly one of the highest-funded film/video library programs by the National Endowment for the Arts.

== Demographics ==
Fall 2025 student body make up
1. White (36.7%)
2. International (25.0%)
3. Hispanic (14.1%)
4. Asian or Pacific Islander (9.40%)
5. African American (6.80%)
6. Multiethnic (4.60%)
7. Not specified (3.10%)
8. American Indian (0.10%)

As of fall 2025, the school enrolled 3,323 students, 2,737 of which were undergraduate and 586 graduate students. 76% of them were female and 25% were from outside of the United States. 7.8% of students were from Chicago.

== Activities ==
The Etching Room, with etching presses and workstations (2006)

=== Visiting Artists Program ===
Founded in 1868, the Visiting Artists Program (VAP) is one of the oldest public programs of the School of the Art Institute of Chicago. Formalized in 1951 by Flora Mayer Witkowsky's endowment of a supporting fund, the Visiting Artists Program hosts public presentations by artists, designers, and scholars each year in lectures, symposia, performances, and screenings. It showcases work in all media, including sound, video, performance, poetry, painting, and independent film; in addition to significant curators, critics, and art historians.

Recent visiting artists have included composer and artist Raven Chacon, artist working with artificial intelligence Stephanie Dinkins, and sculptor and choreographer Guadalupe Maravilla (2023–24 school year). Visiting artists for the 2022–23 school year included Torkwase Dyson and Wu Tsang, 2021-22 included Shirin Neshat, Hito Steyerl and Katie Paterson, and 2020-21 included Meg Onli and Fred Wilson.

Other visiting artists have included Catherine Opie, Andi Zeisler, Aaron Koblin, Jean Shin, Sam Lipsyte, Ben Marcus, Marilyn Minter, Pearl Fryar, Tehching Hsieh, Homi K. Bhabha, Bill Fontana, Wolfgang Laib, Suzanne Lee, and Amar Kanwar among others.

Additionally, the Distinguished Alumni Series brings alumni back to the community to present their work and reflect on how their experiences at SAIC have shaped them. Alumni speakers have included Tania Bruguera, Jenni Sorkin, Kori Newkirk, Saya Woolfalk, Jun Nguyen-Hatsushiba, Trevor Paglen, and Sanford Biggers.

=== Galleries ===
- SAIC Galleries – Located at 33 E. Washington Street, SAIC Galleries occupies four floors and offers 26,000 square feet of exhibition space for annual student and faculty shows, as well as special exhibitions featuring national and international artists.
- Sullivan Galleries – Located to the 7th floor of the Sullivan Center at 33 S. State Street. With shows and projects often led by faculty or student curators, it is a teaching gallery. In the spring of 2020, SAIC announced it would relocate its galleries and Department of Exhibitions & Exhibition Studies from 33 S. State Street to 33 E. Washington Street after ten years of operation.
- SITE Galleries – Founded in 1994, SITE, once known as the Student Union Galleries (SUGs), is a student-run organization at the School of the Art Institute of Chicago (SAIC) for the exhibition of student work. They have two locations: The SITE Sharp of the 37 South Wabash Avenue building; and SITE Columbus of the 280 South Columbus Drive building. The two locations allow the galleries to cycle two shows simultaneously.
- Siragusa Gallery – Led by SAIC's Residence Life team, the Siragusa Gallery is located on the 16th floor of the 162 N. State residence hall and hosts exhibitions by students and Resident Advisors.

=== Student organizations ===
==== ExTV ====
ExTV is a student-run time-arts platform that broadcasts online and on campus. Its broadcasts are available via monitors located throughout the 112 S. Michigan building, the 37 S Wabash building, and the 280 S. Columbus building.

==== F Newsmagazine ====
F Newsmagazine is SAIC's student-run newspaper. The magazine is a monthly publication with a run of 12,000 copies. Copies are distributed throughout the city, mainly at locations frequented by students such as popular diners and movie theaters.

==== Free Radio SAIC ====
Free Radio SAIC is the student-run Internet radio station of The School of the Art Institute of Chicago. Free Radio uses an open programming format and encourage its DJs to explore and experiment with the medium of live radio. Program content and style vary but generally include music from all genres, sound art, narratives, live performances, current events and interviews.

Featured bands and guests on Free Radio SAIC include Nü Sensae, The Black Belles, Thomas Comerford, Kevin Michael Richardson, Jeff Bennett, Carolyn Lawrence, and much more.

==== Student government ====
The student government of SAIC, as required by its constitution, has four officers holding equal power and responsibility. Elections are held every year. There are no campaign requirements. Any group of four students may run for office, but there must always be four students.

The student government is responsible for hosting a school-wide student meeting once a month. At these meetings students discuss school concerns of any nature. The predominant topic is funding for the various student organizations. Organizations which desire funding must present a proposal at the meeting by which the students vote whether they should receive monies or not. The student government cannot participate in the vote: only oversee it.

== Rankings ==
As of 2026, U.S. News & World Report ranks SAIC as the second best overall graduate program for fine arts in the U.S., behind the Yale School of Art and tied with Carnegie Mellon University, the Rhode Island School of Design (RISD), University of California Los Angeles (UCLA), and Virginia Commonwealth University School of the Arts (VCUarts).

In their previous rankings done in 2020, U.S. News & World Report's rankings had SAIC as the second best fine arts program, tied with the Yale School of Art and behind the UCLA School of the Arts and Architecture. In 2016, U.S. News & World Report ranked SAIC the fourth best overall graduate program for fine arts in the U.S. tying with RISD, and behind Yale, UCLA, and Virginia Commonwealth University School of the Arts.

In 2021, the university was ranked the seventh globally according to the QS World University Rankings by the subject Art and Design.

In January 2013, the Global Language Monitor ranked SAIC as the #5 college in the U.S., the highest ever for an art or design school in a general college ranking.

In a 2002 survey conducted by the National Arts Journalism Program at Columbia University, SAIC was named the "most influential art school" by art critics at general interest news publications from across the United States.

== Notable people ==
Notable professors at SAIC include Nick Cave, James Elkins, Lisa Wainwright, Stephanie Brooks, Mary Jane Jacob, Frank Piatek, Edra Soto, Michelle Grabner, Jefferson Pinder, Adrian Wong, and Candida Alvarez.

Notable alumni include Ivan Albright, Thomas Hart Benton, Sanford Biggers, Sonya Clark, Amanda Crowe, Megan Elizabeth Euker, Richard Hunt, Rashid Johnson, Jeff Koons, Joan Mitchell, Georgia O'Keeffe, Trevor Paglen, Sterling Ruby, Dread Scott, Belle Silveira, Norman Teague, Charles W. White, Grant Wood, and Martina Lopez

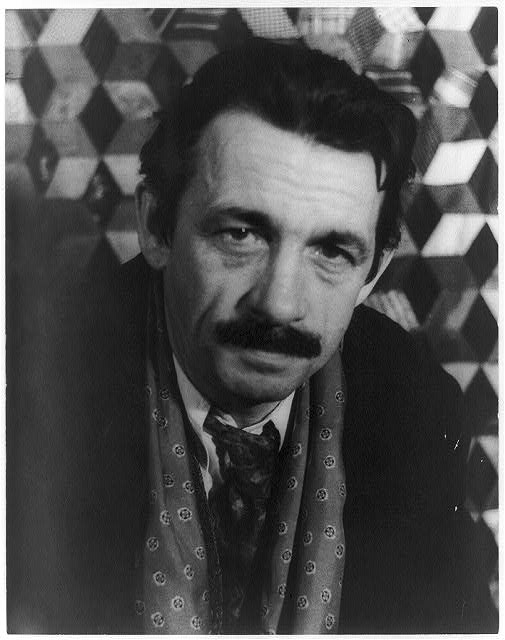
Painter and muralist Thomas Hart Benton (1907–1909)

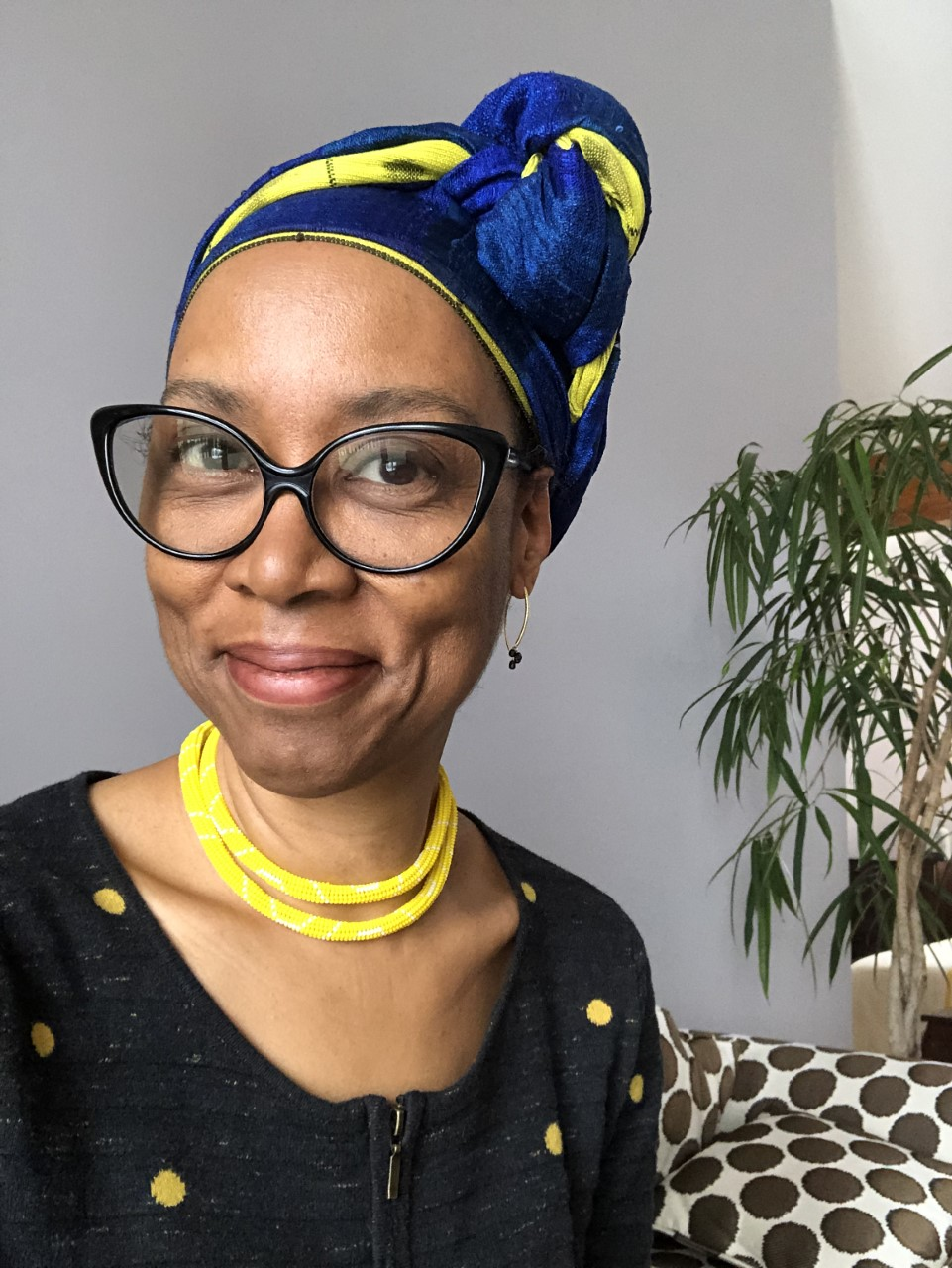
Fiber artist Sonya Clark (BFA 1993)

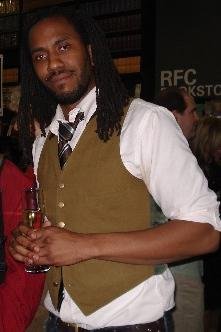
Conceptual artist Rashid Johnson (MFA 2005)

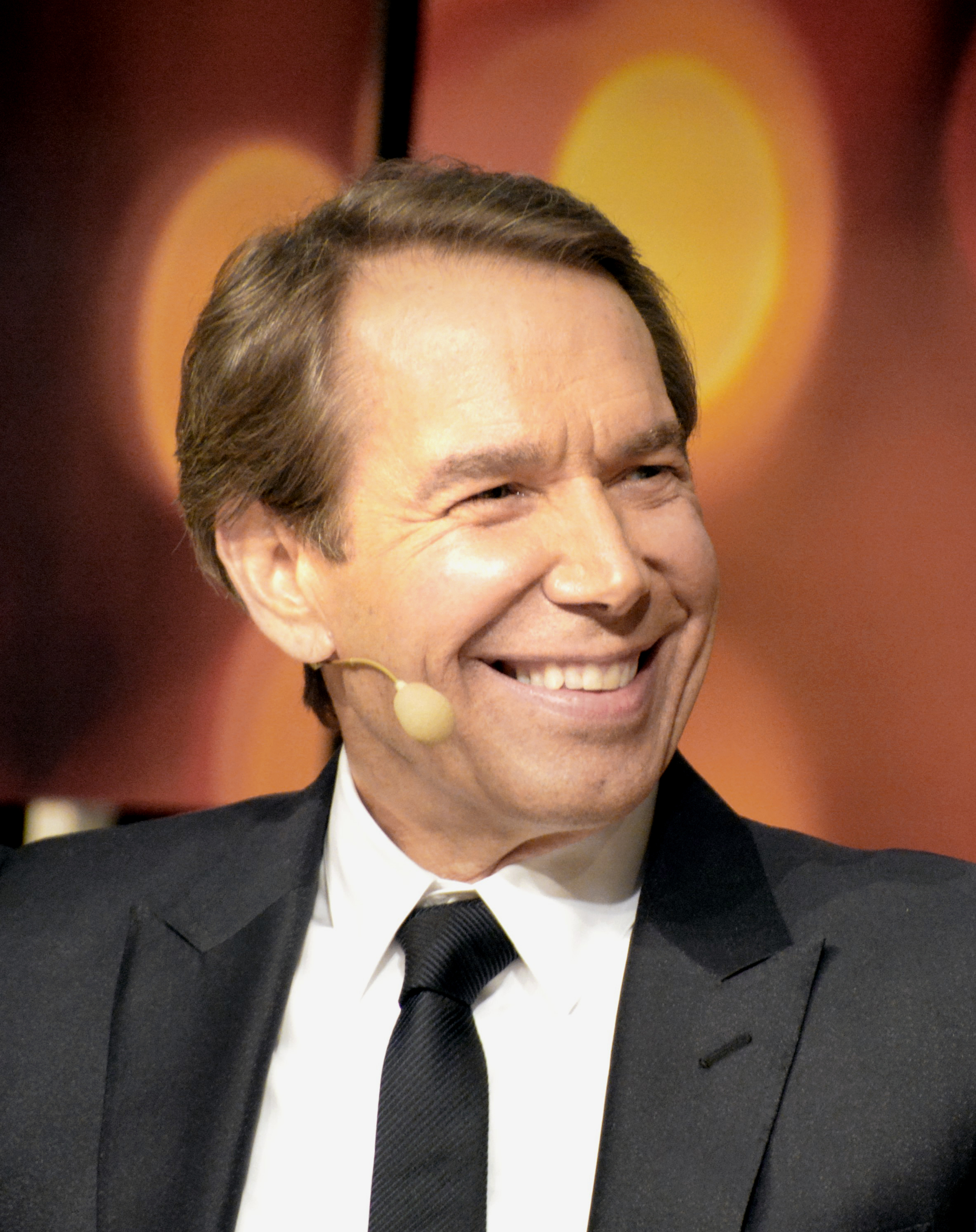
Sculptor Jeff Koons (1975–1976)

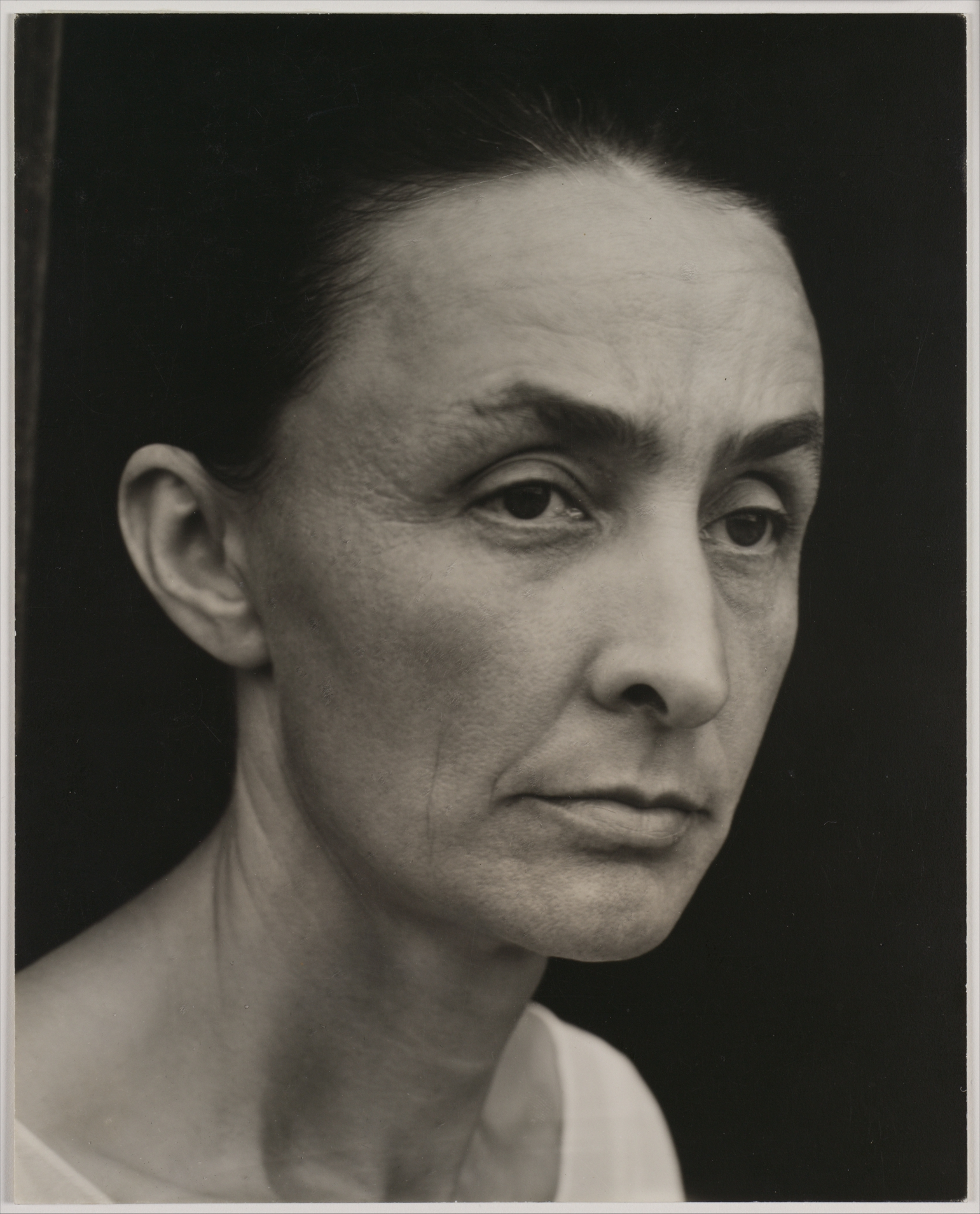
Painter Georgia O'Keeffe (1905–1906)

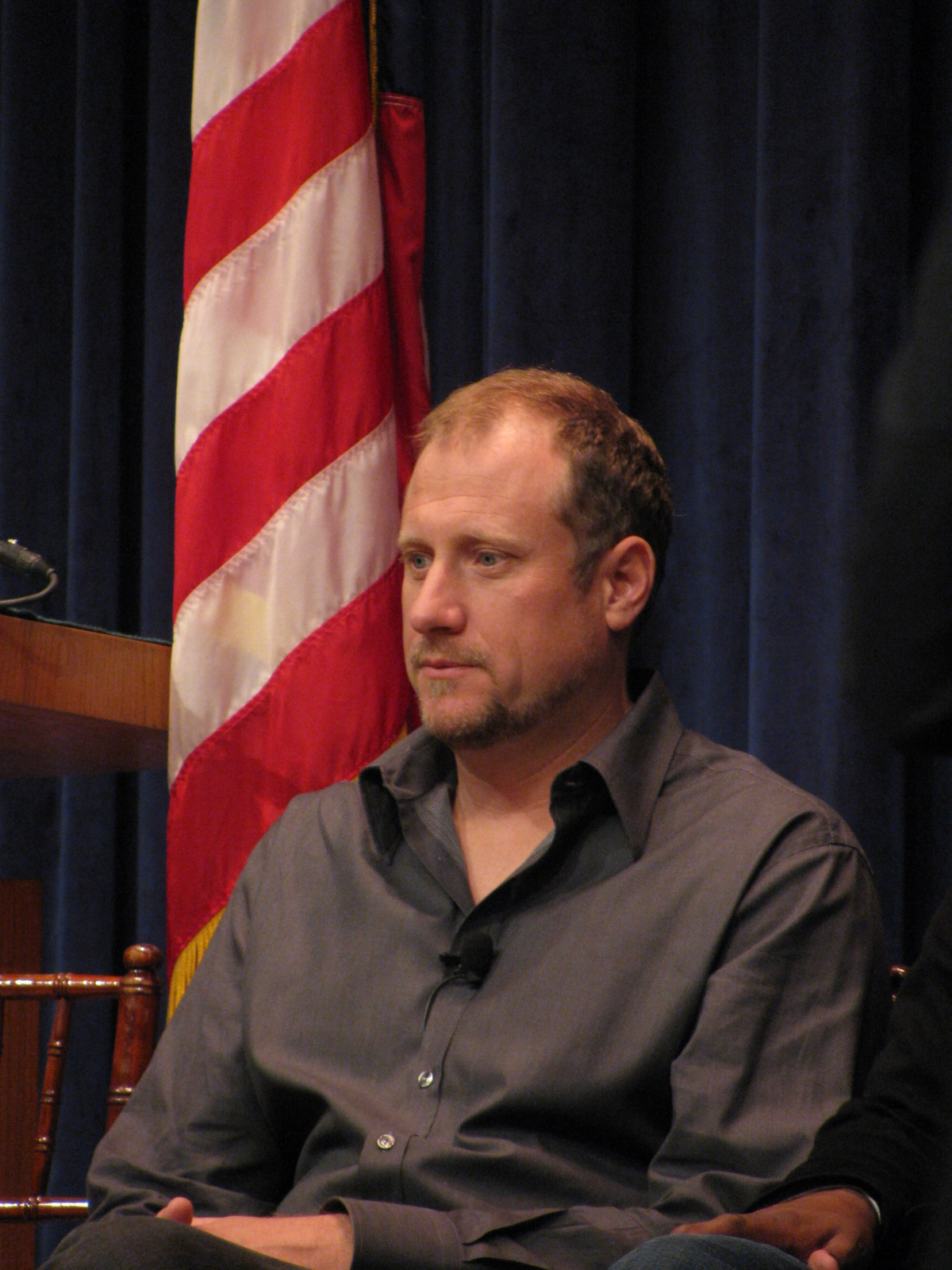
Photographer Trevor Paglen (MFA 2002)

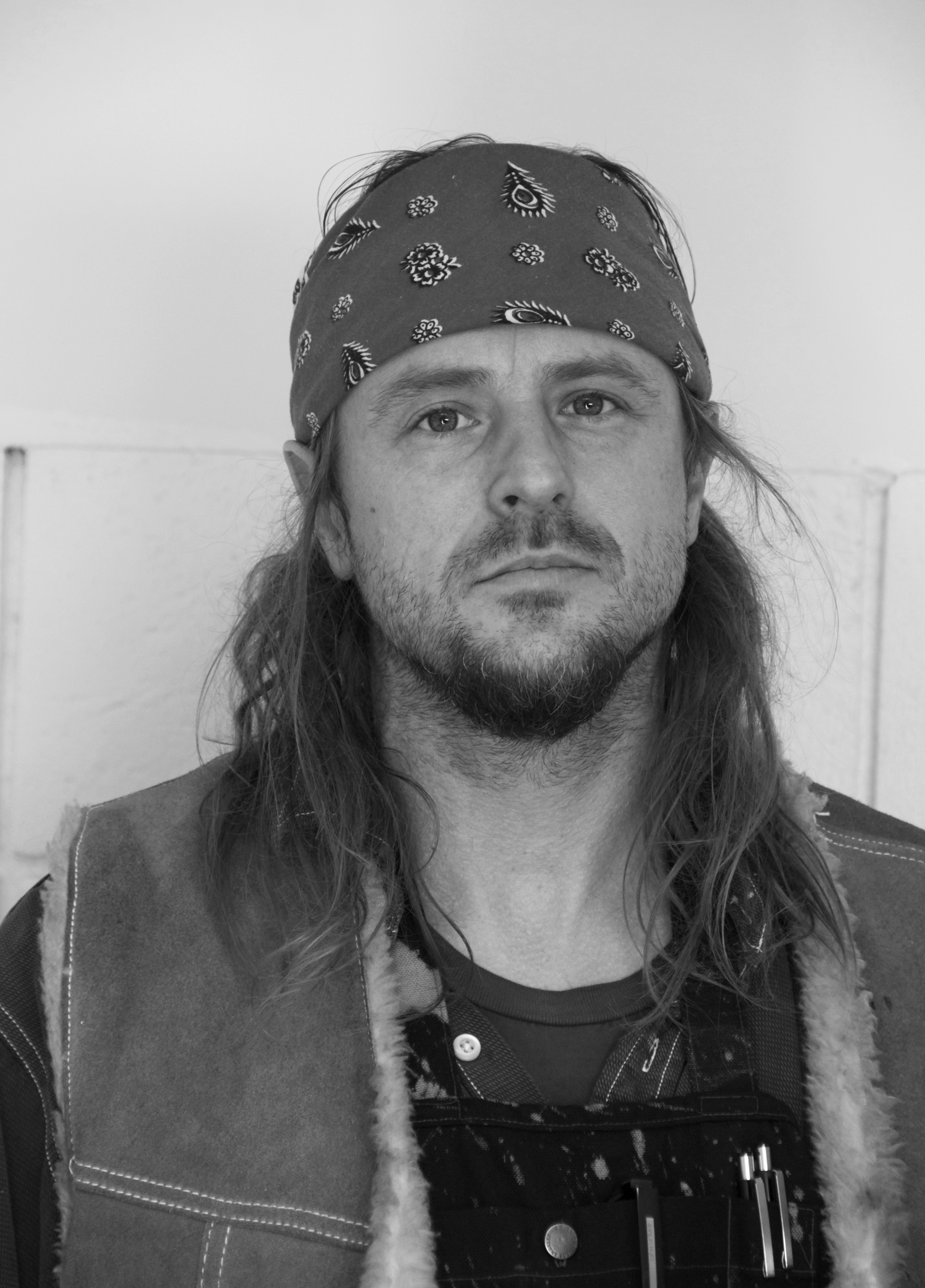
Installation artist Sterling Ruby (BFA 2002)

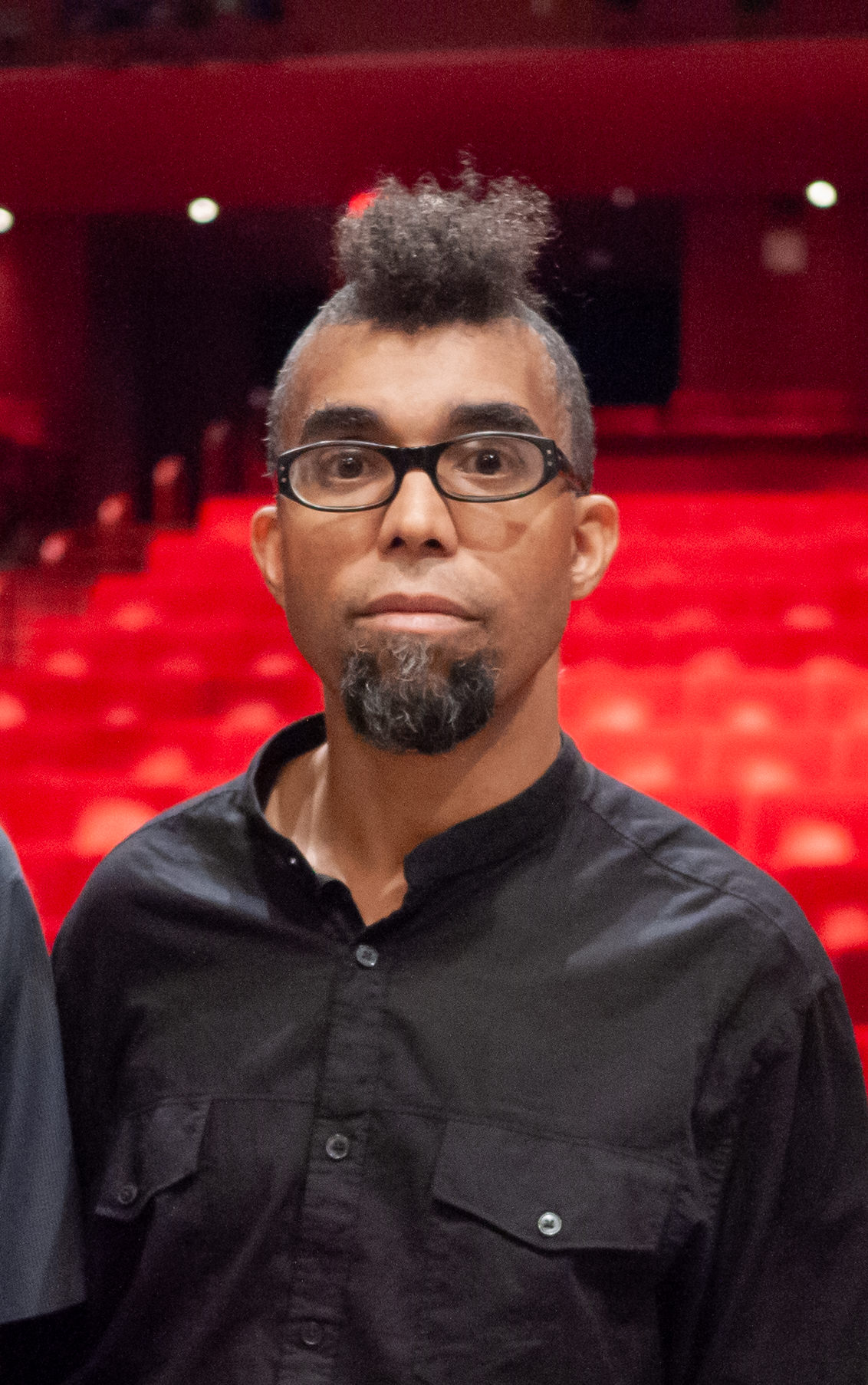
Participatory artist Dread Scott (BFA 1989)

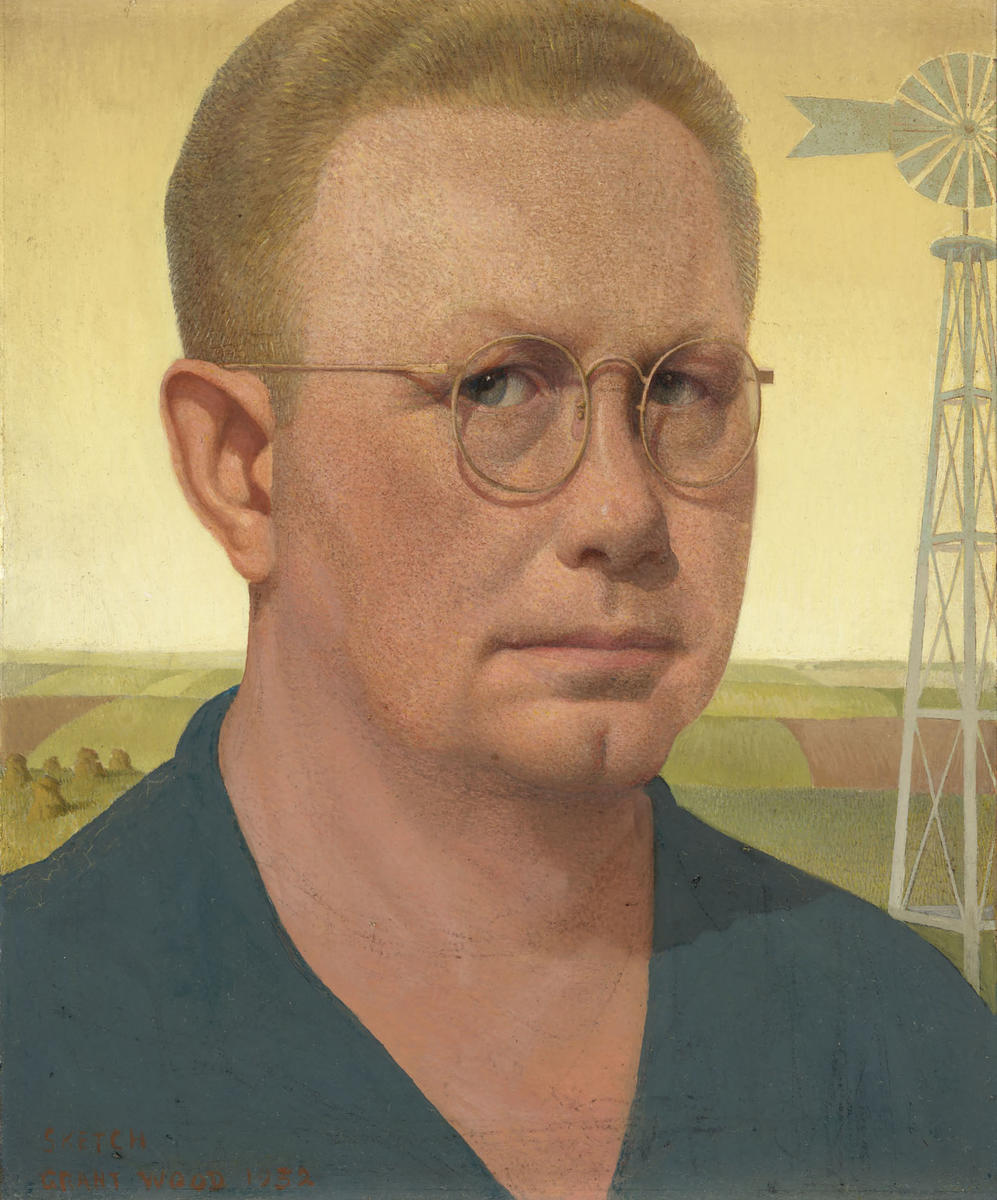
Painter Grant Wood (1913–1916)

== Controversy ==
=== Mirth & Girth ===
On May 11, 1988, a student painting depicting Harold Washington, the first black mayor of Chicago, was taken down by three of the city's African-American aldermen based on its content. The painting by David Nelson, Mirth & Girth, was of Washington clad only in women's underwear.

Police Superintendent LeRoy Martin ordered the removal of the painting, which was returned the following day. The American Civil Liberties Union (ACLU) filed a lawsuit against the Chicago Police Department and the aldermen on the grounds that they had violated Nelson's First, Fourth, and Fourteenth Amendment rights. In 1992, a federal court affirmed his constitutional rights had been violated. In 1994, the city agreed to a settlement: the money would go toward attorneys' fees for the ACLU. The three aldermen agreed not to appeal the 1992 ruling, and the police department established procedures over seizure of materials protected by the First Amendment.

=== What Is the Proper Way to Display a U.S. Flag? ===
In February 1989, as part of a piece entitled What Is the Proper Way to Display a U.S. Flag?, student "Dread" Scott Tyler spread a Flag of the United States on the floor of the institute. The piece consisted of a podium, set upon the flag, and containing a notebook for viewers to express how they felt about the exhibit. In order for viewers to write in the notebook, they would have to walk on the flag, which is a violation of customary practice and code. While the exhibit faced protests from veterans and bomb threats, the school stood by the student's art. That year, the school's state funding was cut from $70,000 to $1, and the piece was publicly condemned by President George H. W. Bush. Scott would go on to be one of the defendants in United States v. Eichman, a Supreme Court case in which it was eventually decided that federal laws banning flag desecration were unconstitutional.

=== Racial slur and art studies ===
In 2018, then Dean of Faculty Martin Berger, an art historian, gave an academic lecture on the civil rights movement in which he read a quote that employed the n-word. This part of his presentation caused controversy among faculty and staff, some thought it appropriate in the academic setting in which it was used, while others did not.

=== Title IX ===
In 2017, a controversy arose after Michael Bonesteel, an adjunct professor specializing in outsider art, and comics, resigned after actions taken by the institute following two Title IX complaints by transgender students being filed against him in which each criticized his comments and class discussion. The institute initiated an investigation and took certain actions. Bonesteel described the SAIC investigation as a "Kafkaesque trial", in which he was never shown copies of the complaints. He claimed he was assumed to be "guilty until proven innocent" and that SAIC "feels more like a police state than a place where academic freedom and the open exchange of ideas is valued".

Laura Kipnis, author of a book on Title IX cases in which she argues that universities follow reckless and capricious approaches, argued that SAIC was displaying "jawdropping cowardice". She said, "The idea that students are trying to censor or curb a professor's opinions or thinking is appalling". The school said the claims made against it were "problematic" and "misleading", and that it supports academic freedom.

== Property ==
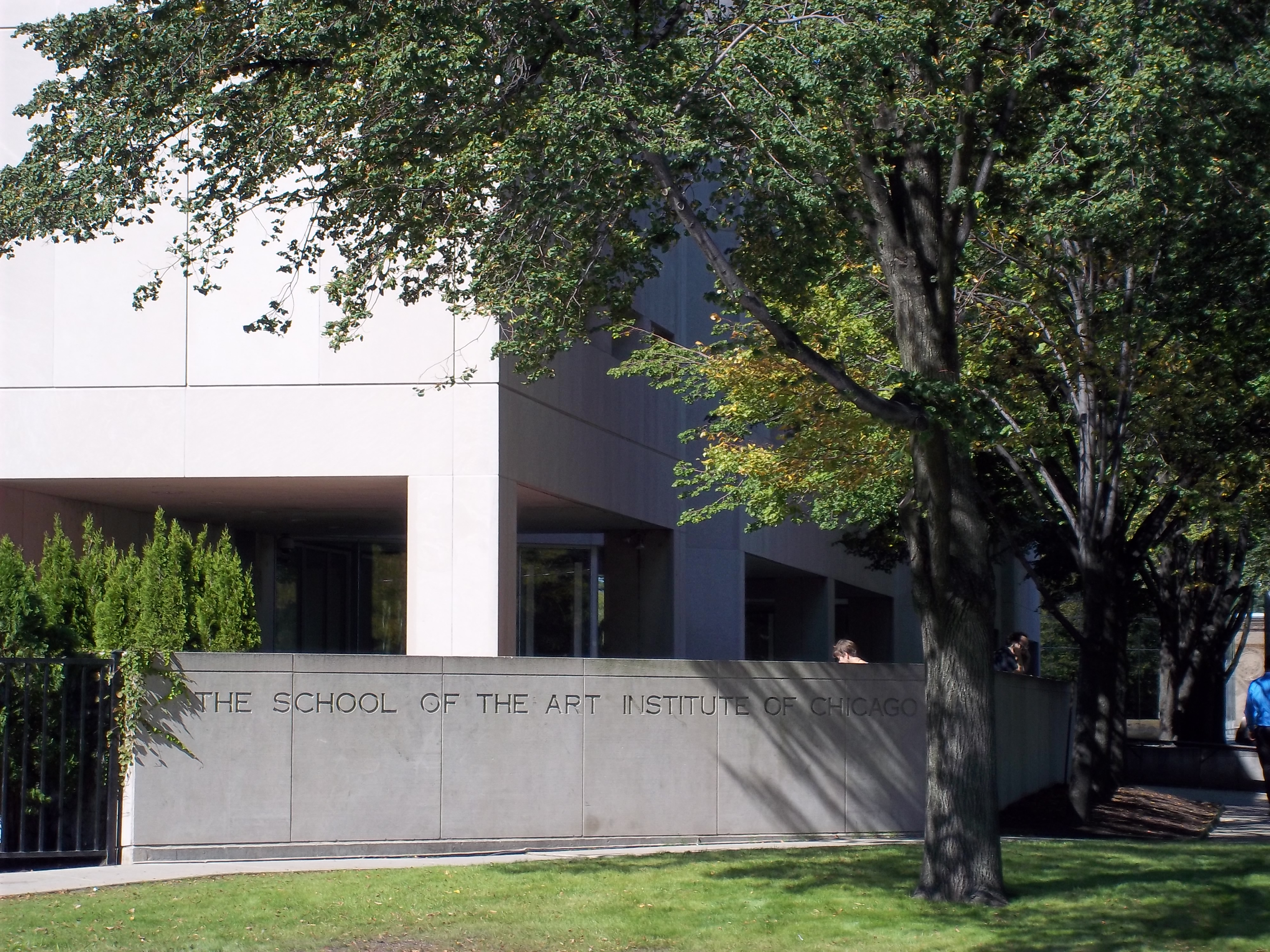
The school's 280 Columbus Avenue building in Grant Park, is attached to the museum and houses a premier gallery showcase.

This is a list of property in order of acquisition:

- 280 Building: 280 South Columbus (classrooms, departmental offices, studios, Betty Rymer Gallery)
- Sharp Building/LeRoy Neiman Center: 37 South Wabash (classrooms, main administrative offices, Flaxman Library)
- MacLean Center: 112 South Michigan (classrooms, departmental offices, studios, ballroom)
- Jones Hall: 7 West Madison (student residences), named after former president and chancellor Tony Jones
- 162 Residences: 162 North State (student residences)
- Gene Siskel Film Center: 164 North State Street
- Lakeview Building: 116 South Michigan

SAIC leases:

- Sullivan Center: 36 South Wabash, leasing the 12th floor (administrative offices, Architecture and Interior Architecture Design Center)
- Sullivan Center: 36 South Wabash, leasing the 7th floor (Fashion Design department, Gallery 2)
- Sullivan Center: 36 South Wabash, leasing offices on the 14th floor (administrative offices)
- Sullivan Center: 36 South Wabash, leasing offices on the 15th floor (administrative offices)
- 33 Building/ SAIC Galleries: 33 East Washington, leasing the lower four stories (gallery space, administrative offices, and graduate studios)
- The Buckingham: 59 East Van Buren (student residences)

== Academic partnerships ==
- Glasgow School of Art (Scotland, United Kingdom)
