= Megan Elizabeth Euker =

Italian and American artist and designer

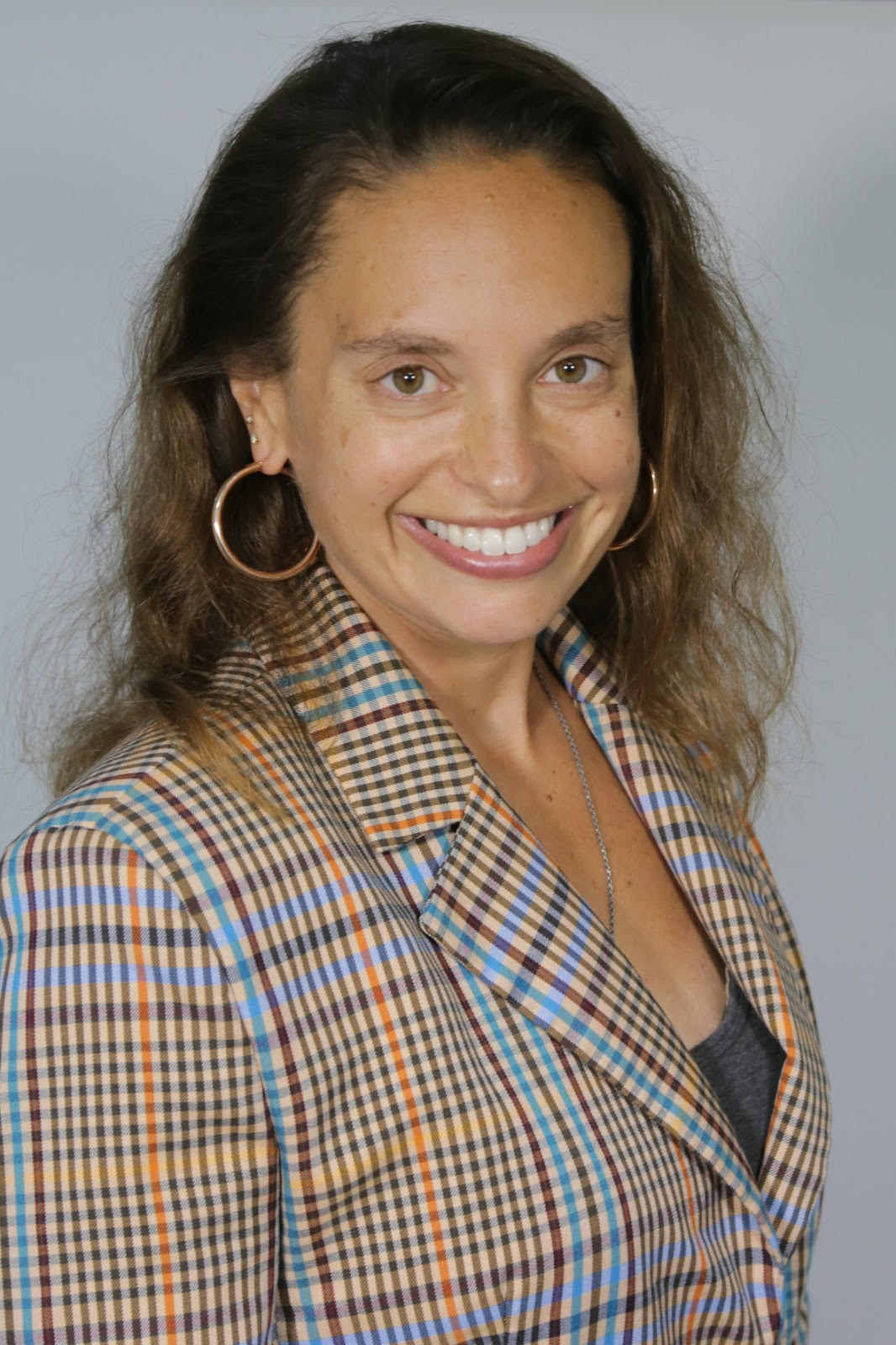
- Born: 1983 (age 42–43); Baltimore, Maryland
- Education: School of the Art Institute of Chicago
- Website: meganeuker.com

Megan Elizabeth Euker (born 1983) is an Italian and American artist and designer.

== Career ==
Since 2008, Euker has exhibited artwork internationally at museums and galleries (represented by Linda Warren Projects). She did a solo exhibition, The Cure at The International Museum of Surgical Science (IMSS) in Chicago.

She has curated three exhibitions of her students work at the IMSS, Chicago, featuring medical devices created under her mentorship. Euker has also been featured at Matthew Rachman Gallery The University Club of Chicago, The Storefront Project, New York. and other galleries and venues.

Euker's artwork has appeared on the covers of Wall Street Journal Bestselling book Flight of the Rondone, by Patrick Girondi published by Skyhorse Publishing, as well as New City, Faded Genes, Blind Faith, and Chivalry by Patrick Girondi published Skyhorse Publishing. Her work has also appeared on the cover of The Philosophy of Sex by Raja Halwani and the music albums Orphan’s Return and Orphan's Final Chapter (Patrick Girondi & the Orphan's Dream).

Euker works with San Rocco Therapeutics as the Vice President in their efforts to bring a safe and accessible gene therapy cure to patients with Sickle Cell Disease and Beta Thalassemia. She has taught at The School of the Art Institute of Chicago, University of South Florida; and the Accademia di Belle Arti in Siracusa, Sicily.

== Education ==
Euker was born in Baltimore, Maryland in 1983. She earned both BFA and MFA degrees from the School of the Art Institute of Chicago between 2005 and 2007. She is a two-time Fulbright grant recipient to Italy.

== Filmography ==
Euker served as Associate Producer for the 2026 film Resurrection, starring Joe Mantegna, Ronnie Marmo, Patrick Girondi, and directed by Brian Connors.

In addition to her production role, she appeared in the film as the character Marie Burke, a court cinematographer.
