= Peter Ludlow =

American linguist and philosopher

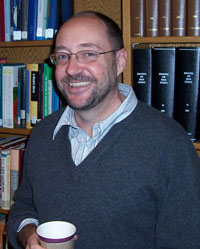
- Ludlow in 2005
- Born: January 16, 1957 (age 69)

Education
- Doctoral advisor: Charles Parsons

Philosophical work
- Era: Contemporary philosophy
- Region: Western philosophy
- School: Analytic philosophy
- Institutions: Northwestern University; University of Toronto; University of Michigan; State University of New York at Stony Brook
- Main interests: Philosophy of language, philosophy of linguistics, epistemology, conceptual issues in virtual worlds
- Notable ideas: Implicit comparison classes, the dynamic lexicon, Ψ-language, tensism, microlanguages

Peter Ludlow (/ˈlʌdloʊ/; born January 16, 1957), who also writes under the pseudonyms Urizenus Sklar and EJ Spode, is an American philosopher. He is noted for interdisciplinary work on the interface of linguistics and philosophy—in particular on the philosophical foundations of Noam Chomsky's theory of generative linguistics and on the foundations of the theory of meaning in linguistic semantics. He has worked on the application of analytic philosophy of language to topics in epistemology, metaphysics, and logic, among other areas.

Ludlow has also established a research program outside of philosophy and linguistics. Here, his research areas include conceptual issues in cyberspace, particularly questions about cyber-rights and the emergence of laws and governance structures in and for virtual communities, including online games, and as such he is also noted for influential contributions to legal informatics. In recent years Ludlow has written nonacademic essays on hacktivist culture and related phenomena such as WikiLeaks and the conceptual limits of blockchain technologies. Most recently he has argued that blockchain-based communities will be the new organizing technologies for human governance, replacing the 400-year old Westphalian system of the nation state.

Ludlow has also written literature and poetry under various pseudonyms, most frequently under the name EJ Spode, which he has used to experiment with various forms of dialect prose and poetry and a genre of literature that he has called Hysterical Surrealism.

Ludlow has taught as a professor of philosophy at the State University of New York at Stony Brook, the University of Michigan, the University of Toronto and Northwestern University. He is currently Director of the Research Institute for Philosophy and Technology (iRIFT.net) – an international research institution seeking to increase communication between philosophy and accelerated technologies.

== Education and career ==
Ludlow received his B.A. in 1979 from Bethel College. He received his PhD in philosophy from Columbia University in 1985 under the direction of Charles Parsons, but also studied with Noam Chomsky and James Higginbotham at MIT. He worked for a year on projects related to natural language processing as an engineer at Honeywell from 1985 to 1986.

From 1987 to 2002 he worked at the State University of New York at Stony Brook Department of Philosophy as an assistant professor and from 1994 as an associate professor. He was a professor of philosophy at the University of Michigan from 2002 to 2007, a professor of philosophy at the University of Toronto from 2007 to 2008 and a professor of philosophy at the Northwestern University from 2008 to 2015. From 2011 he was also John Evans Professor in Moral and Intellectual Philosophy at Northwestern University.

He has been a visiting fellow at the Ca' Foscari University of Venice in 1993, 1995 and 1997–1998, when he held a Fulbright distinguished chair. He has also been a visiting fellow at King's College London in 1997 and a visiting professor at the Rutgers University Center for Cognitive Science in 2012, where he taught a course on hacktivism. He has also held visiting positions at several other universities in the United States and Europe.

== Work ==
=== Philosophy of generative linguistics ===
Ludlow's work in generative linguistics has revolved around three basic themes. The first theme is that generative linguistics at its best is concerned with understanding and explanation, and not just with observation and data gathering. To this end, generative linguistics is interested in underlying mechanisms that give rise to language related phenomena, and this interest will often trump the goal of accumulating more data.

The second theme is what he calls the "Ψ-language hypothesis". It is the hypothesis that the underlying mechanisms (the more basic elements) posited by generative linguists are fundamentally psychological mechanisms and that generative linguistics is a branch of cognitive psychology, but against Noam Chomsky's I-Language hypothesis Ludlow argues that it doesn't follow that cognitive psychology must therefore be interested in mental states individuated solely by what happens inside the language user's head. It is consistent with the Ψ-language hypothesis that psychological states (and indeed syntactic states) are individuated in part by the embedding environment.

The third theme is what Ludlow calls the principle of "methodological minimalism". It is the thesis that best theory criteria like simplicity and formal rigor cannot be given theory neutral definitions, and thus must really come down to one thing: seek methods that help linguists to do their jobs with the minimum of cognitive labor.

=== Foundations of semantics ===
Ludlow's earliest work in semantics was an attempt to combine work in the theory of meaning with contemporary work in generative linguistics, but using resources that are more parsimonious than those typically used in semantic theory—for example without using the higher-order functions and intensional objects deployed in Montague grammar. The resources were largely limited to primitives like truth and reference to individuals.

His subsequent work has explored ways of formalizing alternative approaches to semantic theory—including the possibility of formalizing a Wittgensteinian use theory or expressivist semantics for natural language, which is to say a theory in which the building blocks of a semantic theory are expressions of attitudes rather than primitives like truth and reference.

=== Philosophy of language ===
==== Intensional transitive verbs ====
Ludlow's PhD dissertation defended a proposal dating back to the medieval logician Jean Buridan, and revived by W.V.O. Quine in philosophy and James McCawley in linguistics, according to which so-called "intensional transitive verbs" like "seek" and "want" are really propositional attitudes in disguise. He has subsequently developed these ideas in collaboration with the linguists Richard Larson and Marcel den Dikken.

==== Interpreted logical forms ====
Ludlow's paper with the semanticist Richard Larson, "Interpreted Logical Forms", advocated a quasi-sententialist view of propositional attitude verbs (a view that has been criticized by Scott Soames in Chapter 7 of his book Beyond Rigidity). Ludlow's response to Soames involves the idea that propositional attitude reports are not supposed to correspond to some fact about what is going on inside the agent's head but rather are created by a speaker S, for the benefit of a hearer H, to help H form some theory about the agent being reported on. Crucial to this account is the idea that the lexicon is dynamic and that speakers engaged in conversation will negotiate the coinage of terms "on the fly" in constructing attitude reports.

==== The dynamic lexicon ====
Ludlow's work on interpreted logical forms has led to the development of a view of linguistic meaning according to which meaning shifts are much more common than intuition suggests. He rejects the "common coin" view of word meaning, and argues that word meanings are negotiated on the fly as conversational partners build little microlanguages together. These ideas have subsequently been applied to controversies in epistemology (see below).

==== Implicit comparison classes ====
In his article "Implicit Comparison Classes" Ludlow argues for the syntactic reality of comparison class variables in adjectival constructions. That is, when one says "the elephant is small", there is an implicit variable for the comparison class (in this case elephants, as in "small for an elephant"), and that variable is represented by the language faculty. That work was influential in subsequent work on the context sensitivity of language by Jason Stanley and Zoltán Gendler Szabó, and has played a role in debates about contextualism in contemporary epistemology.

==== Contextualism in epistemology ====
Recent work in epistemology has pushed back against skepticism by arguing that knowledge attributions are context sensitive—our standards of knowledge vary from context to context. So, while in a philosophy class I may not know I have hands, in other contexts (for example, chatting in a bar) I do. Ludlow initially argued that there were implicit argument positions for standards of knowledge. In response to criticism from Jason Stanley in his book "Knowledge and Practical Interests", Ludlow has advanced a doctrine that he calls "Cheap Contextualism". The idea is that on the dynamic lexicon view, shifts in word meaning are ubiquitous, and the meaning of the term "know" is not an exception. Contextualism in epistemology is just a consequence of these garden variety shifts in meaning.

==== Natural logic ====
Ludlow has written a series of papers on the logical form of determiners (words like "all", "some", and "no") and has pursued the idea that their most interesting properties can be given purely formal or syntactic accounts. The work borrows from one of the central ideas of medieval logic—the hypothesis that all the key logical inferences can be reduced down to just two basic inferences that are sensitive to whether the syntactic environment was dictum de omni or dictum de nullo—classical notions that are basically equivalent to the contemporary notions of upward and downward entailing environments. To explain, in an upward entailing (de omni) environment a superset can be substituted for any set. In a downward entailing environment a subset may be substituted for a set. Ludlow revives the medieval project by combining it with the descriptive tools of contemporary Chomskyan linguistics and recent technical work in formal logic.

==== Perspectival properties ====
Ludlow's first book, Semantics, Tense, and Time, was devoted to arguing that presentism, a metaphysical thesis that denies the reality of past and future events, is consistent with the intuitive truth of much of our tensed discourse. More recently, he has argued that while tense is an ineliminable feature of reality, the resulting position (called "tensism") does not force us to be presentists. He has extended this basic idea to argue that perspectival properties (properties that are not universal, but rather are tied to a person’s perspectival point of view) are ubiquitous and ineliminable, both from physics and from our attempts to explain human action and emotion. More radically, he has argued that even the theories of information and computation traffic in perspectival properties.

=== Conceptual issues in cyberculture ===
==== Criticizing the Greek god model of governance ====
Most of Ludlow's work on cyberculture has centered on the question of governance for virtual worlds and he has been critical of what he calls the "Greek god model" of virtual world governance. This is a model in which virtual world platform owners do not have coherent systematic policies to deal with in world disputes, but rather reach in and dabble as suits their dispositions at the moment. In an e-book entitled "Our Future in Virtual Worlds" Ludlow argues that as our lives continue to move online, the Greek god model becomes ever more dangerous. This critique has been extended to social networking platforms more generally.

==== Online gaming chronicles ====
Ludlow founded The Alphaville Herald on October 23, 2003. It was the unofficial newspaper for the Alphaville server of The Sims Online, where Ludlow used the avatar Urizenus Sklar. Its stories uncovered in-game scams and cyber-prostitution, and highlighted Electronic Arts' indifference to the social problems in their game.

In a controversy, reported in the New York Times and elsewhere (including law journals), Ludlow was kicked out of The Sims Online after some editorials criticized Electronic Arts Corporation for their failures at managing and policing the gamespace. The newspaper subsequently migrated to another virtual world, Second Life, in June 2004.

The Herald has been written about in Wired and the Columbia Journalism Review. Ludlow (in the voice of Urizenus Sklar) is currently a contributing editor, while the avatar Pixeleen Mistral, revealed by Ludlow in 2010 to be Internet pioneer Mark P. McCahill, is the newspaper's managing editor.

Ludlow and Mark Wallace wrote a book about The Herald and its exploits called The Second Life Herald: the Virtual Tabloid that Witnessed the Dawn of the Metaverse (MIT Press, 2007). The book received the American Association of Publishers, Professional/Scholarly Publishing award for "Best Book in Media and Cultural Studies, 2007", was named a Choice "Outstanding Academic Title, 2008", and Library Journal honored it as a "Top Sci-Tech Book, 2007," (they ranked it one of top 39 science books of 2007 and top book in category of Computer Science).

MTV.com has described Ludlow as the "Unwelcome Guest" in the "10 most influential video game players of all time" because of his chronicles about online video games. In particular MTV wrote that EA revoked Ludlow's "online citizenship" in The Sims Online, allegedly because the "offense was Ludlow's publication of a TSO-centric newspaper that chronicled creative and sometimes troublesome behavior of other gamers in the world, including allegations that under-age players were involved in virtual-sex-related activities. EA claimed Ludlow's newspaper violated the terms of service for playing TSO" and that Ludlow later similarly chronicled the game Second Life with his The Second Life Herald.

== Controversies ==
Ludlow has been a highly prominent, and sometimes controversial, figure in several virtual worlds communities, especially The Sims Online and Second Life, since the early 2000s. He has been accused by Scott Jennings and Catherine Fitzpatrick of giving griefers "his blessing" through his newspaper, The Alphaville Herald. In response, Ludlow and Wallace argued in their book The Second Life Herald that merely reporting on griefer behavior is not the same as endorsing griefer behavior, and that it is better to report on such activities than to cover them up, which is why game companies aim to do.

Ludlow resigned from his position at Northwestern in November 2015 after a university Title IX Officer found that he violated the University’s Title IX policies. Ludlow denied any wrongdoing and said the relationship was consensual, lasting three months. Fellow Northwestern professor Laura Kipnis, famous for saying that “bona fide harassers should be chemically castrated, stripped of their property, and hung up by their thumbs in the nearest public square," defended him after attending the University’s disciplinary hearings, stating that female university students should be responsible for their own decisions about whether to date a professor, and argued that "you have to feel a little sorry these days for professors married to their former students. They used to be respectable citizens [...] and now they’re abusers of power." In 2017 Laura Kipnis published the book Unwanted Advances: Sexual Paranoia Comes to Campus, discussing the Ludlow case in detail; one of the students who brought the Title IX complaint against Ludlow has sued Kipnis for defamation based on the description in the book. In March 2018, the district court denied the defendants' motion to dismiss the student's lawsuit. The lawsuit against Kipnis has been resolved, and as Kipnis responded on the Leiter Reports blog, "In case there’s any confusion, Unwanted Advances remains in print and I stand by everything in the book."

== Partial bibliography ==
- High Noon on the Electronic Frontier (1996) ISBN 0-262-62103-7
- Semantics, Tense, and Time: an Essay in the Metaphysics of Natural Language (1999) ISBN 978-0-262-12219-1
- Crypto Anarchy, Cyberstates, and Pirate Utopias (2001) ISBN 0-262-62151-7
- The Second Life Herald: The Virtual Tabloid that Witnessed the Dawn of the Metaverse (2009) ISBN 978-0-262-51322-7
- Our Future in Virtual Worlds (2010) ASIN: B0044XV80U
- The Philosophy of Generative Linguistics (2010) ISBN 978-0-19-925853-6

== See also ==
- The WELL
- Pirate utopia

== Notes ==
Academic offices
Preceded by	John Evans Professor in Moral and Intellectual Philosophy at Northwestern University; 2011–2015	Succeeded by
