= The Alphaville Herald =

Online newspaper

- "Always fairly unbalanced"
- Format: Digital
- Owner: Peter Ludlow (Urizenus Sklar)
- Editor: Mark P. McCahill (Pixeleen Mistral)
- Founded: October 23, 2003
- Ceased publication: December 14, 2013
- Relaunched: September 20–22, 2016
- Language: English
- Website: alphavilleherald.com

The Alphaville Herald is an online newspaper covering virtual worlds, founded by the American philosopher Peter Ludlow in 2003.

== History ==
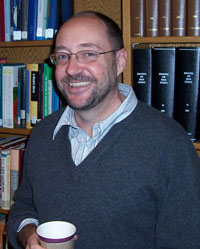
The newspaper's founder Peter Ludlow, formerly John Evans Professor in Moral and Intellectual Philosophy at Northwestern University, is noted for his work on the interface of linguistics and philosophy, conceptual issues in cyberspace and hacktivist culture.

The Alphaville Herald was established by the American philosopher Peter Ludlow, known by his pseudonym Urizenus Sklar, on October 23, 2003. Ludlow, who was formerly the John Evans Professor in Moral and Intellectual Philosophy at Northwestern University, is a student of Noam Chomsky and is well known for his work on the interface of linguistics and philosophy, but also for his research on conceptual issues in cyberspace and his more recent writings on hacktivist culture. According to scholars Constantinescu and Decu, The Alphaville Herald was the first "virtual free press," pioneering mass communication in virtual worlds.

It was originally a newspaper for the Alphaville virtual city of The Sims Online, where Ludlow used the avatar Urizenus Sklar. Its stories uncovered in-game scams and cyber-prostitution, and highlighted Electronic Arts' indifference to the negative consequences of their game and the problems of virtual democracy. EA terminated Ludlow's account, which made international headlines, and the newspaper migrated to another virtual world, Second Life, in June 2004. The newspaper was known as The Second Life Herald from 2004 to 2009, when it returned to its original title.

Ludlow eventually appointed Mark Wallace as Managing Editor, and they published a book on the newspaper's history on MIT Press in 2007. Wallace left the newspaper when he was employed by Linden Lab, and the Internet persona Pixeleen Mistral became the new Managing Editor. In 2010, Pixeleen Mistral was revealed by Ludlow to be the Internet pioneer Mark P. McCahill, widely known as the principal inventor of the Gopher protocol, the effective predecessor of the World Wide Web, and who also co-invented a number of other Internet technologies and coined the phrase "surfing the Internet." Various people have written for the publication, including Catherine A. Fitzpatrick.

== Editors ==
- Peter Ludlow (as Urizenus Sklar)
- Mark Wallace
- Mark P. McCahill (as Pixeleen Mistral)

== Literature ==
- Peter Ludlow and Mark Wallace, The Second Life Herald: The Virtual Tabloid that Witnessed the Dawn of the Metaverse, MIT Press, 2007, ISBN 978-0-262-12294-8
