= Luc Barthelet =

French businessman (born 1962)

- Born: 1962 (age 63–64)
- Occupation: Executive

Luc Barthelet (born 1962) is a French tech executive, known for his role in the development of games in the Sims and Simcity series as the general manager of Maxis after their acquisition by EA. He was formerly the CTO and President of Technology at Electronic Arts. He joined Unity Technologies in December 2018.

Between 1988 and May 2008 he worked for Electronic Arts. As Group Studio Head, Electronic Arts, he was instrumental in the development of persistent state worlds, including the alternate reality game Majestic, and the MMOs Motor City Online, Earth and Beyond, Ultima Online and The Sims Online. From 1997 to 2004, Barthelet was also general manager of Maxis, where he led product development for titles such as The Sims, The Sims 2, SimCity 4 and SimCity 3000.

After leaving EA, he became the CEO of TirNua, Inc., developers of the browser-based MMO of the same name. During this time, Barthelet was also on the advisory board of Mixamo. TirNua was acquired by RockYou! in December 2010, and Barthelet left to become executive director of Wolfram Alpha, a position he held until May 2014. In 2018, Barthelet joined Unity as their general manager of Cloud Services. He became SVP of Technology in 2020, and also served in roles as CTO and general manager of the Unity Engine, until leaving Unity at the end of 2024.

Since early 2025, he became founder and CTO of BoardGameLab, co-founded with Eric Hautemont of Days of Wonder.

Between 2014 and 2018, he circumnavigated on his catamaran with his wife Sarah Flannery and his children.
