= Bound and Gagged: Pornography and the Politics of Fantasy in America =

1996 book by Laura Kipnis

Bound And Gagged: Pornography and the Politics of Fantasy in America
- Author: Laura Kipnis
- Publisher: Duke University Press
- Publication date: 1996
- Pages: 226
- ISBN: 0-8223-2343-5
- OCLC: 255263903

Bound And Gagged: Pornography and the Politics of Fantasy in America is a 1996 book by Laura Kipnis. It attempts to approach pornography in a new way, focusing not on whether pornography is a serious social ill, but rather on its nature and what its function and meaning might be in the lives of its audience as well as the lives of those who seek to ban or suppress it.

The book is divided into five sections, each of which can stand more or less independently as individual essays:

1. "Fantasy In America: The United States v. Daniel Thomas DePew" presents an account of the first computer bulletin board entrapment case, in which Daniel DePew is convicted of conspiring to make a snuff film and sentenced to thirty-three years in prison even though there was little evidence that his "plans" were anything other than kinky sexual fantasy.
2. "Clothes Make The Man" is a look at transvestite pornography, specifically the self-portrait personal advertisements, comparing them to the more "respectable" work of photographer Cindy Sherman.
3. "Life In The Fat Lane" is about fat fetish pornography and contemporary American culture's anxiety and hypocrisy about fat and desire. She argues that pornography featuring obese subjects is a revolt against the cultural aesthetic of thinness.
4. "Disgust And Desire: Hustler Magazine" discusses Larry Flynt's use of pornography as a political, class-conscious act. It also examines feminists' disgust with Hustler and similar magazines because they are class-based.
5. "How To Look At Pornography," the book's conclusion, discusses (among other things) the marriage of anti-pornography writer Catharine MacKinnon and anti-psychoanalytic writer Jeffrey Masson.

Kipnis rejects the more militant anti-pornography views expressed by feminists such as Andrea Dworkin and dismisses the conservative movement to exempt pornography from First Amendment protection. She sets out her view that pornography is a legitimate cultural expression which exposes class prejudices and sexual hypocrisy while it deliberately seeks to transcend taboos. The book involves themes including Freudian analysis, consumer capitalism, and societal taboos.
