= SimCity 3000 =

- North American cover art
- Developer: Maxis
- Publisher: Electronic Arts
- Director: Christine McGavran
- Designer: Jim Gasperini
- Programmer: Greg Kearney
- Artists: Ocean Quigley; Christian Stratton
- Composers: Kirk Casey; Kent Jolly; Anna Karney; Robi Kauker; Jerry Martin; Marc Russo
- Series: SimCity
- Platforms: Windows, Mac OS, Linux, iOS
- Release: Windows: NA: February 1, 1999; EU: February 13, 1999; Mac OS; July 30, 1999; Linux; July 19, 2000 iOS; December 18, 2008
- Genre: City-building
- Mode: Single-player

SimCity 3000 is a city building simulation video game released in 1999, and the third major installment in the SimCity series. It was published by Electronic Arts (EA) and developed by series creator Maxis. It was released for Microsoft Windows, Macintosh, and, through an arrangement with Loki Games, Linux.

== Gameplay ==
A mature city in SimCity 3000, featuring a population higher than 1 million

There are many changes between SimCity 3000 and its immediate predecessor SimCity 2000. These changes span both the integral city management aspects of the game, as well as its graphical and landscape aspects. More and newer city services are featured. These changes create a greatly different experience from that of SimCity 2000.

The most notable change is the addition of the concept of waste management. In SimCity 3000, garbage begins to accumulate when the city grows to a medium size, and must be disposed of at the expense of the city. Farms and agricultural structures are also introduced, appearing on large light industrial zones in a city with low land value and little pollution. A new zoning density was also added, totaling three densities, compared to SimCity 2000's two.

In addition to their limited life span, power plants and other utility buildings were also made vulnerable to decreasing maximum output due to age. All power plants have a life span, and additionally, the water facilities now have a life span as well.

Although the concept of neighbor cities was introduced in SimCity 2000, it was greatly expanded upon in SimCity 3000. New for players is interaction with neighbouring cities, negotiating rudimentary business deals with other mayors, such as the sale or purchase of water, electricity or waste management services. These generate a monthly charge which is either added to or deducted from the player's treasury, in accordance with the deal. Canceling a neighbor deal would incur a penalty, unless the deal was cancelled when the other city wished to renegotiate.

Although not strictly a city management aspect, SimCity 3000 simulates the effect of land value on construction much more realistically than in SimCity 2000. In SimCity 3000, land value creates very distinct neighborhoods which tend to contain narrow income bands, creating well-defined slums, middle class areas, and wealthy areas. Land value is also determined by the city center effect where buildings that are at the city center have higher land values and those buildings on the borders have lower land values.

Business deals were another new concept to SimCity 3000; by allowing certain structures, such as a maximum security prison, to be built within the city, the player can receive a substantial amount of funds from them. Business deal structures, however, tend to have negative effects on the city, such as reduced land value.

There are several changes to the graphical interface in SimCity 3000. Although the game retains the pseudo-isometric dimetric perspective of its predecessor, the actual landscape became more complex and colorful. In SimCity and SimCity 2000, the playable landscape is mostly brown, while in SimCity 3000, the playable landscape is a more realistic green color, along with other colors that progressively change by height, from beige (beach sand) to green to brown (bare ground) to white (snow). In SimCity 2000, land could either be flat or sloped, and all slopes were of the same steepness. In SimCity 3000, there are five distinct steepness of slope, creating more varied landscapes. There are different types of trees which can appear on the playable map, ranging from small, deciduous trees to towering redwoods.

=== Advisors and petitioners ===
SimCity 3000 and its revision, Unlimited, feature seven advisors, each covering a specific issue (city finances, transportation, environmental issues, city planning, safety, health and education, and city utilities), who help players make proper decisions in the game by providing recommendations and advice. As opposed to previous versions of SimCity, these advisors have names and give in-depth advice, rather than brief summaries of the situation in their department.

There are also petitioners, many of whom are citizens of the city, that request players to modify city policies, such as lowering tax rates, or enacting an ordinance. Some are outside interests, often pushing proposals which would harm the city (i.e. building a casino, which would attract crime) in exchange for a boost to its financial coffers. The mayors of the four cities neighboring at each of the edges of the city's map (a feature carried over from SimCity 2000) also chime in if the player's city is connected to them by road or rail, to request that the player's city handle their city services (trash disposal, water, power, etc.) in exchange for financial compensation, or offer that the neighbor handles the city services for the player's city in exchange for a fee.

=== News tickers ===
In addition to advisors, a news ticker scrolls along the bottom of the screen, displaying pertinent information about the city in the form of news stories, such as indicating that the city needs more schools, or how well a particular city department is functioning. Generally, when things were going very well in a city, the news ticker would display headlines which are comical, or even nonsensical and often seemingly useless to the player. Examples of such headlines being: "After 36 years of marriage, man discovers wife to be form of rare yucca plant," or "(City Name) prints all wrong numbers in phone book, leads to 15 marriages" or quotes from a "Tommy B. Saif."

Other headlines may be labeled "(City Name) News Ticker" or "From the Desk of Wise Guy Sammy". On occasions, the ticker will even provide a foreshadowing of an approaching disaster, for example, sometimes reading "Did you feel that big truck pass by? What? It wasn't a truck?", or "Mrs. SimLeary buys prize-winning cow", or perhaps another quote from a set range of different headlines before a disaster occurs. The text in the ticker can then be clicked to reveal more about the news item.

=== Landmarks ===
Real world landmarks are also introduced in SimCity 3000, but are mostly for aesthetic purposes (though placing a building would open up an option in the city ordinances window for tourism advertising), and are free of construction cost. Examples of landmarks featured in the original SC3K include the Parthenon, the CN Tower, Notre Dame, the Bank of China Tower, the Empire State Building, the Pharos of Alexandria and the Twin Towers of the World Trade Center with each tower a separate building, the Statue of Liberty, the Eiffel Tower, as well as the Fernsehturm TV Tower in Berlin.

=== Music ===
Another major change from SimCity 2000 is the addition of a live music score, whose lead composer is Jerry Martin. The new soundtrack incorporates new-age and live jazz songs, with David Lauser on drums and Darol Anger on violin.

== Development ==
Prior to the acquisition of Sim developer Maxis by Electronic Arts in 1997, plans were originally made in 1996 to develop SimCity 3000 as a fully 3D game, in tune with the emergence of 3D video games. Although the idea was deemed impractical by employees for being too graphically demanding, Maxis management pushed for the concept, and the game was developed for a year. When the game was first unveiled in the 1997 E3, it was "an experience still regarded as an embarrassment." The 3D version of the game was expected to become a flop, and its future release was even thought to be the fatal blow to an already poorly performing Maxis, which had failed to release profitable titles in the years since SimCity 2000.

Following the signing of the acquisition deal, Maxis assured the public that SimCity 3000 was still set to be released in December 1997. After EA completed acquisition of Maxis, Luc Barthelet was assigned by EA as the new general manager of Maxis. He was troubled by the 3D SimCity 3000, questioning the viability of a game with such graphics. Eventually, the 3D version was completely scrapped, Lucy Bradshaw was brought in from EA in November 1997 to lead the SimCity 3000 project, and a new revision based on SimCity 2000's pseudo-isometric dimetric projection and sprite-based graphics was redeveloped from scratch. The new plan focused on retaining the core engine of the game, improving more minor features in the game instead, such as larger maps, new zoom levels, and additional gameplay parameters.

The second version of SimCity 3000 would receive a more positive reception during its appearance in 1998 E3, and was well-received after its release in February 1999 (although Maxis originally intended the game to be released by Christmas 1998; regardless, EA willingly waited until the game was completed).

== Reception ==
Reception

Review scores
Publication	Score
AllGame	2/5 (Mac)
GameSpot	8.5/10
IGN	9.0/10
Next Generation	4/5

=== Sales ===
SimCity 3000 shipped 1 million copies in its debut six months. In the German market, it received a "Gold" award from the Verband der Unterhaltungssoftware Deutschland (VUD) by the end of May 1999, indicating sales of at least 100,000 units across Germany, Austria and Switzerland. It was the United States' best-selling computer game during the first half of 1999, and by the end of September had sold 470,000 units in the country. This drew revenues of almost $20 million. It claimed second place for the year overall—behind Rollercoaster Tycoon—with sales of 657,514 copies and revenues of $26.8 million. This gross was the highest that year for a computer game in the United States. In 2000, SimCity 3000' placed ninth in the United States, with another 385,001 units sold. This earned an additional $10.5 million in revenue.

In the United States, the game's Unlimited edition alone sold 1.1 million copies and earned $27.5 million by August 2006, after its release in January 2000. Edge ranked it as the country's sixth best-selling computer game between January 2000 and August 2006, and the highest-selling SimCity title during that period. Combined sales of all SimCity computer games released between January 2000 and August 2006, including SimCity 3000 Unlimited, had reached 3.4 million units in the United States by the latter date. SimCity 3000: UK Edition received a "Platinum" sales award from the Entertainment and Leisure Software Publishers Association (ELSPA), indicating sales of at least 300,000 copies in the United Kingdom.

According to Maxis's Lucy Bradshaw, SimCity 3000 achieved global sales of 4.6 million units by January 2002. Using data from product registrations, she explained that the overall series' userbase was three-fourths male and one-fourth female at that time. The game sold 5 million copies worldwide by 2007.

=== Reviews and awards ===
SimCity 3000 received positive reviews. IGN gave it a 9.0, praising sound, gameplay, graphics, and lasting appeal. GameSpot gave it an 8.5 and praised its graphics while criticizing the adviser system. SimCity 3000 Unlimited has also gained critical acclaim with IGN giving it a 9.1 praising its presentation and graphics. The Academy of Interactive Arts & Sciences nominated SimCity for "PC Strategy Game of the Year" at the 2nd Annual Interactive Achievement Awards, although the game lost to Sid Meier's Alpha Centauri.

Next Generation reviewed the PC version of the game, rating it four stars out of five, and stated that "SimCity 3000 is great fun and loaded with interesting, mind-absorbing gameplay."

The Classic Mac OS version of the game received generally negative reviews. AllGame editor Lisa Karen Savignano criticized the game for having a steep learning curve and noted that many of the game's new features (when compared to SimCity Classic and SimCity 2000) "add nothing to the game in terms of playability and very little in terms of enjoyment". In his January 2000 review for MacAddict, Mark D. Shuchat-Marx referred to SimCity 3000 as "a big disappointment", noting that the game "doesn't actually run well on a Mac".

== Legacy ==
=== Expanded edition ===
In May 2000, the game was re-released under different names in different regions, such as SimCity 3000 Unlimited (in North America and Oceania), SimCity 3000 Deutschland (Germany), SimCity 3000 Edition Mondiale (France), SimCity 3000 Korea (South Korea), Mahanakhon 3000 (Thailand) SimCity 3000 UK Edition (UK and Ireland) and SimCity 3000 World Edition (other countries), among others. This added, among other things, East Asian and European building sets, additional terrain colors and vegetation types, a snapshot feature, additional music, an improved version of the Building Architect Tool (a pseudo-3D design tool based on cubes), four additional disasters (such as locusts and space junk), additional landmarks (like the Seoul Tower and Helsinki Cathedral), new reward buildings, thirteen scenarios (along with an editor based on Microsoft Access) and a new FMV intro.

Premade cities are also available, including London and Liverpool for the UK, Berlin (with the Berlin Wall), Madison, Madrid, Moscow and Seoul. The game also includes city terrains based on the geography of real cities, including Hong Kong and Chicago. At the time of the game's release, EA launched a website for Simcity 3000 Unlimited which allowed users to exchange their creations. The site, formerly located at www.simcity.com/us/exchange/ (for North American territories), is no longer available and can only be accessed with an archiving tool.

SimCity 3000 Unlimited was re-released digitally on GOG.com on July 14, 2016, and later on Steam on March 7, 2024.

=== SimCity DS ===
SimCity DS is a heavily modified version of SimCity 3000 for the Nintendo DS released in Japan on February 22, 2007, North America on June 19, 2007, and Europe on June 22, 2007. The game inherits SC3K's graphics, but makes use of the handheld's dual screens to display additional interfaces. Console-specific features are also included, such as the use of the console's integrated microphone, which is used to blow out fires, and the touchscreen, which is used to control the interface. The game also features a "Save the City" mode, in which the player must help one of several cities recover from a disaster and reach a specific target to succeed.

=== Linux ===
Loki Entertainment released SimCity 3000 Deutschland, SimCity 3000 Unlimited, and SimCity 3000 World Edition for Linux.

=== iPhone and iPod Touch ===
A version of SimCity 3000, known as SimCity for iPhone, was released in 2008 for the iPhone and iPod Touch.
