= Lucy Bradshaw (game developer) =

American video game producer

- Education: University of Michigan (B.A., Psychology)
- Occupation: Video game producer
- Known for: The Sims; SimCity

Lucy Bradshaw is an American video game producer. She is the former senior vice president and general manager of Maxis, a subsidiary of Electronic Arts.

Bradshaw worked at LucasArts and Activision before moving to Electronic Arts in 1997. Shortly afterward, Electronic Arts acquired Maxis, and Bradshaw became an executive producer on SimCity 3000.

Bradshaw became senior vice president of Maxis in 2013, after serving as the studio's general manager. Bradshaw oversaw development of SimCity, The Sims, and Spore. She encountered controversy due to technical issues with the 2013 reboot of SimCity.

In 2010, Fast Company named Bradshaw as one of the most influential women in technology. In 2013, Fortune named Bradshaw one of the 10 most powerful women in gaming.

Bradshaw left Electronic Arts in 2015. Following her departure, she joined the Social VR team at Facebook. Her former co-worker Rachel Franklin, who had taken over Bradshaw's position at Maxis, became head of the Social VR team in 2016.
