= Laura Kipnis =

American cultural critic and author

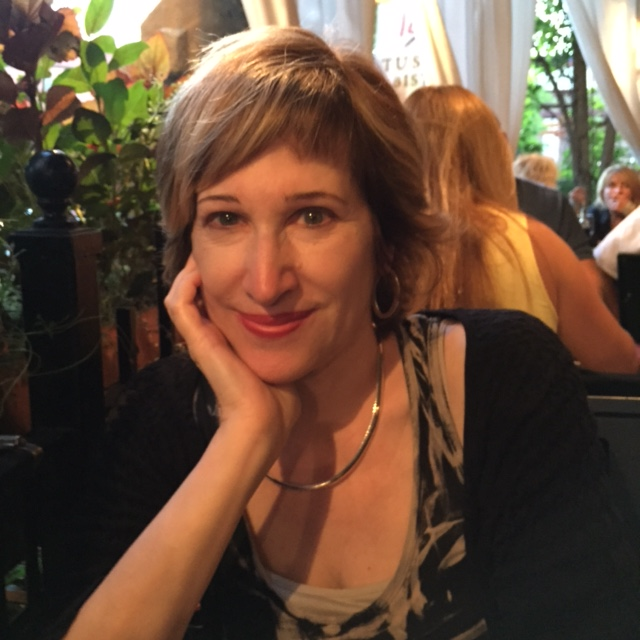
- Laura Kipnis at the New York State Writers Institute, 2015
- Born: July 19, 1956 (age 69); Chicago, Illinois, U.S.

Laura Kipnis (born 1956) is an American cultural critic, essayist, educator, and former video artist. Her work focuses on sexual politics, gender issues, aesthetics, popular culture, and pornography. She began her career as a video artist, exploring similar themes in the form of video essays. She is professor emerita of media studies at Northwestern University in the department of radio-TV-film, where she teaches filmmaking. In recent years she has become known for debating sexual harassment, and free speech policies in higher education.

== Career ==
Kipnis was born in Chicago, Illinois. She grew up on the South Side, where her father owned a shoe store.

She received a Bachelor of Fine Arts degree at the San Francisco Art Institute; and a Master of Fine Arts degree from Nova Scotia College of Art and Design. She also studied at the Whitney Museum Independent Study Studio Program.

She has received fellowships for her work from the Guggenheim Foundation, the Rockefeller Foundation, the Michigan Society of Fellows, and the National Endowment for the Arts. In her early career she worked as a video artist.

She has been assistant professor, associate professor, and is now full professor at Northwestern University. She taught previously at the University of Wisconsin-Madison, and as a visiting professor at the School of the Art Institute of Chicago, New York University, Columbia University School of the Arts, and the University of British Columbia.

== Work ==
In her 2003 book Against Love: A Polemic, a "ragingly witty yet contemplative look at the discontents of domestic and erotic relationships, Kipnis combines portions of the slashing sexual contrarianism of Mailer, the scathing antidomestic wit of early Roseanne Barr and the coolly analytical aesthetics of early Sontag."

In 2010 she published How to Become a Scandal: Adventures in Bad Behavior, which focused on scandal, including those of Eliot Spitzer, Linda Tripp, James Frey, Sol Wachtler, and Lisa Nowak; the book examined "the elaborate ways those transgressors reassure themselves that they are not bringing colossal ruin upon themselves, that their dalliances will never see the light of day". "What allows for scandal in Kipnis's schema is every individual's blind spot, "a little existential joke on humankind (or in some cases, a ticking time bomb) nestled at the core of every lonely consciousness ... Ostensibly about scandal, her book is most memorable as a convincing case for the ultimate unknowability of the self".

Her essays and reviews have appeared in Slate, Harper's, Playboy, The New York Times, The New York Review of Books, The Atlantic, The Guardian, and Bookforum.

== Writings about sexual harassment policies ==
In March 2015, after Northwestern University professor Peter Ludlow had been accused of sexual harassment, Kipnis wrote an essay in the Chronicle of Higher Education in which she decried "sexual paranoia" on campuses and discussed professor-student sexual relationships and trigger warnings. Kipnis claimed that having sex with professors was "practically on the syllabus" when she was an undergrad, and she implied that as a professor she had dated at least one of her own graduate students. The essay was later included in the Best American Essays of 2016, edited by Jonathan Franzen.

Two students filed a complaint with Northwestern's Title IX office against Kipnis following the essay. Kipnis discussed the charges and details of the investigation of those complaints in an essay titled "My Title IX Inquisition," noting that her faculty support person had also been brought up on Title IX complaints over public statements about her case. Northwestern eventually exonerated her.

Kipnis's 2017 book, Unwanted Advances: Sexual Paranoia Comes to Campus discusses the Ludlow case and argues that sexual harassment policies do not empower women but rather impede the fight for gender equality. One of the students who had brought the Title IX complaints against Ludlow initiated a lawsuit naming Kipnis and her publisher, HarperCollins, alleging invasion of privacy and defamation. Kipnis has publicly stated, "In case there’s any confusion, Unwanted Advances remains in print and I stand by everything in the book." Unwanted Advances was named one of the Wall Street Journal's ten best non-fiction books of 2017. Jennifer Senior wrote in the New York Times, “Few people have taken on the excesses of university culture with the brio that Kipnis has. Her anger gives her argument the energy of a live cable.”

In addition to speaking on college campuses around the country about issues related to feminism, free speech, #MeToo, campus sexual politics, and gender equity, in 2017 Kipnis participated in a New York Times Magazine roundtable on the subject of "Work, Fairness, Sex and Ambition" together with Anita Hill and Soledad O’Brien. Kipnis said:

Here’s a historical and political way of looking at the current moment. There have been, roughly speaking, two divergent tendencies in the struggle for women’s rights that come together in the issue of workplace harassment, which is why I think this all seems so significant. If you look at the history of feminism, going back to the 19th century, you’ve got, on the one hand, the struggle for what I’d call civic rights: the right to employment, the right to vote, to enter politics and public life. On the other side, there’s the struggle for women to have autonomy over our own bodies, meaning access to birth control, activism around rape, outlawing marital rape, and the fight for abortion rights. What we’re seeing now is the incomplete successes in both of these areas converging. We’ve never entirely attained civic equality. We’ve never entirely attained autonomy over our bodies. Which is why the right not to be sexually harassed in the workplace is the next important frontier in equality for women.

== New York Review of Books controversy ==
Kipnis wrote, in a 2018 New York Times opinion piece "The Perils of Publishing in a #MeToo Moment" protesting the Books' firing of editor Ian Buruma: "One consequence of Mr. Buruma’s departure will be a new layer of safeguards we won’t even know are in place, including safeguards from the sort of intellectual risks The New York Review of Books always stood for."

== Select bibliography ==
=== Books ===
- Ecstasy Unlimited: On Sex, Capital, Gender, and Aesthetics (Minneapolis, Minn.: University Of Minnesota Press, 1993)
- Bound and Gagged: Pornography and the Politics of Fantasy in America (New York: Grove Press, 1996)
- Against Love: A Polemic (New York: Pantheon Books, 2003)
- The Female Thing: Dirt, Sex, Envy, Vulnerability (New York: Pantheon Books, 2006)
- How to Become a Scandal: Adventures in Bad Behavior (New York: Metropolitan Books, 2010)
- Men: Notes from an Ongoing Investigation (New York: Metropolitan Books, 2014)
- Unwanted Advances: Sexual Paranoia Comes to Campus (New York: HarperCollins, 2017)
- Love in the Time of Contagion: A Diagnosis (New York: Pantheon Books, 2022)

=== Essays ===
- Kipnis, Laura (1986). "'Refunctioning' Reconsidered: Toward a Left Popular Culture". In MacCabe, Colin (ed.). High Theory/Low Culture: Analyzing Popular Television and Film. New York: Palgrave Macmillan. pp. 11–36.
- Kipnis, Laura (Autumn 1986). "Aesthetics and Foreign Policy". Social Text (15). Duke University Press: 89–98. doi:10.2307/466494. JSTOR 466494.
- Kipnis, Laura (1989). "Feminism: The Political Conscience of Postmodernism?". Social Text (21). Duke University Press: 149–166. doi:10.2307/827813. JSTOR 827813.
- "It's a Wonderful Life: Hustler Publisher Larry Flynt's Long, Strange Journey from Hillbilly Entrepreneur to First Amendment Hero". Village Voice: 37–39. 31 December 1996.
- Kipnis, Laura (2001). "(Male) Desire and (Female) Disgust: Reading Hustler". In Harrington, Lee; Bielby, Denise (eds.). Popular Culture: Production and Consumption. Malden, Mass.: Backwell. pp. 133–153.
- "Meet Playboy Sr.: Has the Once-Groundbreaking Magazine become Culturally Irrelevant?". Slate. 30 October 2003.
- "The Anxiety of (Sexual) Influence: Are Onetime "Unwanted Advances" Really a Feminist Issue?". Slate. 19 March 2004.
- "Condi's Inner Life: What Freudian Slips Do—Or Don't—Tell Us about Politicians". Slate. 26 April 2004.
- "Can Marriage Be Saved?". The Nation. 279 (1): 19. 5 July 2004.
- "Navel Gazing: Why Even Feminists are Obsessed with Fat". Slate. 5 January 2005.
- "Ladies First: The Utopian Fantasy of Deep Throat". Slate. 11 February 2005.
- "Is Porn Really Transforming Our Sex Lives?". Slate. 20 September 2005.
- "Why Aren't More Women "Opting Out"?". Slate. 21 September 2005.
- "America's Waistline: The Politics of Fat". Slate. 28 October 2005.
- "Why We Can't Live Without Them". Slate. 25 August 2010.
- "They Produce Very Useful Scapegoats. Like Dr. Laura, For Example". Slate. 1 September 2010.
- "What Tiger Woods Didn't Understand About His Mistresses". Slate. 1 September 2010.
- "Roger Clemens, James Frey, and the Thrill of Watching the Overly Ambitious Fall". Slate. 8 September 2010.
- "We're All Scandal Addicts Now; And That's a Good Thing". Slate. 15 September 2010.
- "Why is Eliot Spitzer on TV? Because Disgrace Doesn't Stick Like It Used To". The Washington Post. 3 October 2010.
- "Why Did Weiner Do It?". Slate. 9 June 2011.
- "Execs Like Emil Michael Don't Hate Women—They're Terrified of Them". Time Magazine. 20 November 2014.
- "Sexual Paranoia Strikes Academe". The Chronicle of Higher Education. 27 February 2015.
- "My Title IX Inquisition". The Chronicle of Higher Education. 29 May 2015.
- "Narcissism: A Reflection". Spiked. January 2017.
- "The Perils of Publishing in a #MeToo Moment". The New York Times. 25 September 2018.
- "Why Are Scholars Such Snitches?", Chronicle of Higher Education, March 17, 2022

=== Reviews ===
- "Girl, Interrupted". Village Voice. 16 March 1999. Archived from the original on June 28, 2009.
- "Lust and Disgust: A Short History of Prudery, Feminist and Otherwise". Harper's Magazine. Vol. 315, no. 1, 888. September 2007. pp. 87–91.
- "School for Scandal: The Larger Meaning of the Sordid Little Tale". Harper's Magazine. Vol. 318, no. 1, 906. March 2009. pp. 73–77.
- "Pushing The Limits: Why Is Contemporary Art Addicted to Violence?". New York Times Book Review. 14 July 2011. p. 1.
- "Amazing Disgrace". Bookforum. September–November 2011.
- "I Mean It". New York Times Book Review. 12 August 2012. p. 17.
- "Death by Self-Parody". Bookforum. December 2011 – January 2012.
- "Crazy in Love". Bookforum. April–May 2013.
- "Me, Myself, and Id: The Invention of the Narcissist". Harper's Magazine. Vol. 329, no. 1, 971. August 2014. pp. 76–81.
- "Marry by 30". Slate. 9 April 2015.
- "Screw Wisdom". The Atlantic. Vol. 319, no. 5. Washington, D.C.: Atlantic Media, Inc. June 2017. pp. 31–33.

== Bibliography ==
- Goldberg, Michelle (16 March 2015). "The Laura Kipnis Melodrama". The Nation.
- Juffer, Jane (1998). At Home with Pornography: Women, Sex, and Everyday Life. New York: NYU Press. ISBN 0814742378.
- Mead, Rebecca (6 April 2015). "Two Beds and the Burdens of Feminism". The New Yorker.
- Schapiro, Morton (18 March 2015). "The New Face of Campus Unrest". The Wall Street Journal.
