= Unwanted Advances =

2017 book by Laura Kipnis

Unwanted Advances: Sexual Paranoia Comes to Campus
- Author: Laura Kipnis
- Publisher: Harper
- Publication date: April 4, 2017
- Pages: 256
- ISBN: 978-0-06-265786-2

Unwanted Advances: Sexual Paranoia Comes to Campus is a 2017 book by the American cultural critic Laura Kipnis, published by Harper. The book is largely based on the case of the philosopher Peter Ludlow, who resigned from Northwestern University after a university disciplinary body found that he sexually harassed two students. Ludlow denied any wrongdoing and said the relationship was consensual. A central argument of the book is that "the stifling sense of sexual danger sweeping American campuses" and "neo-sentimentality about female vulnerability" do not empower women, but impede the fight for gender equality.

A student who had brought a Title IX complaint discussed at length in the book filed a lawsuit against Kipnis and her publisher, HarperCollins, alleging invasion of privacy, defamation, and other charges relating to the book. The case was settled. Kipnis has publicly stated, "In case there’s any confusion, Unwanted Advances remains in print and I stand by everything in the book." Unwanted Advances was named one of The Wall Street Journal's Ten Best Non-Fiction Books of 2017.
