= Patrick Girondi =

American singer

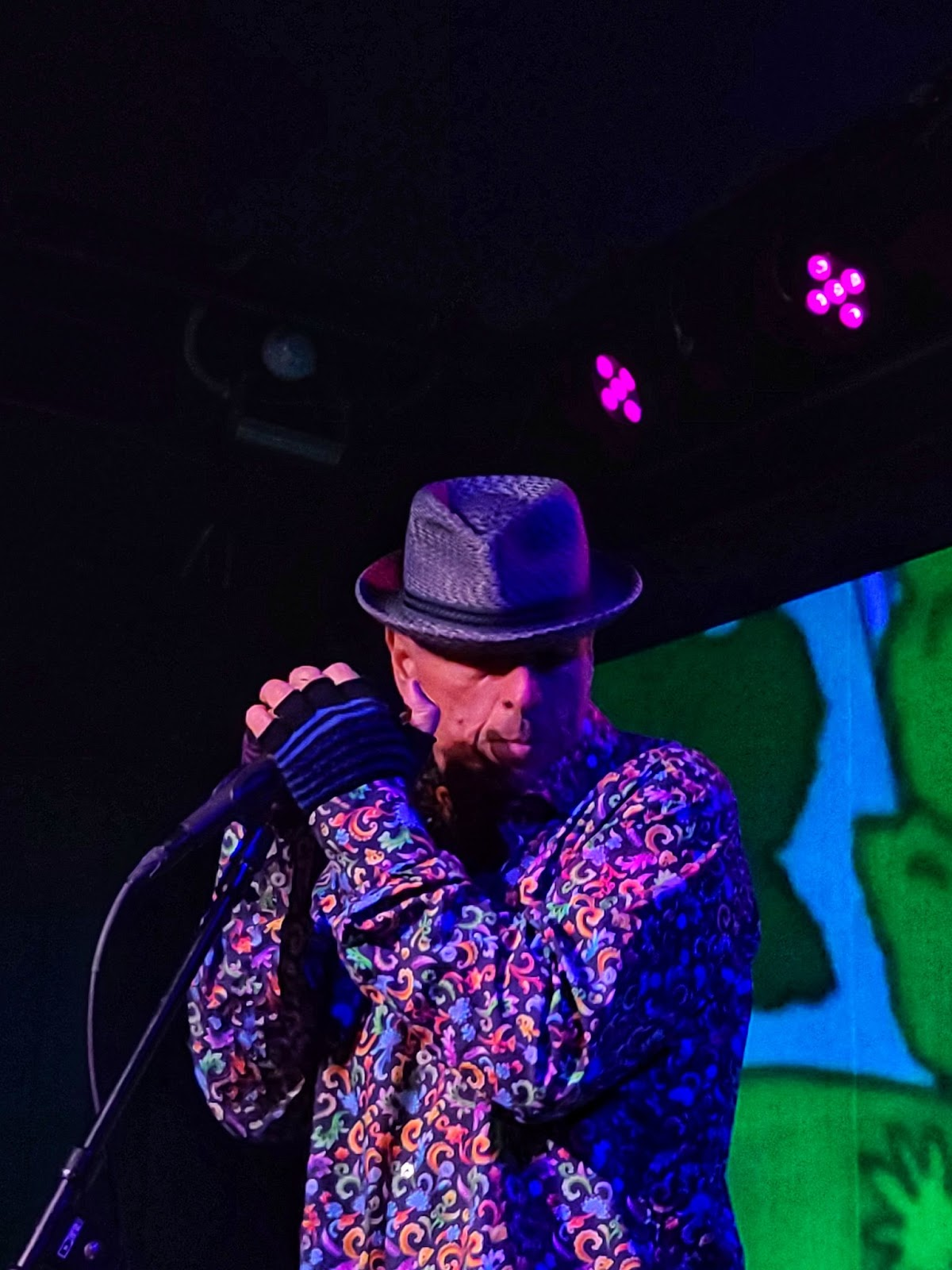
- Born: Patrick Michael Finley; Chicago, Illinois
- Occupations: Singer, Entrepreneur
- Known for: Singing, Songwriting, Founder and CEO San Rocco Therapeutics

Patrick Girondi is an Italian-American singer, composer and pharmaceutical executive/patient advocate. He is the founder and CEO of San Rocco Therapeutics.

== Early life ==
Patrick Girondi was born and named Patrick Michael Finley in Chicago, Illinois. He later took his mothers’ maiden name, "Girondi" in 1985. He was a high school dropout .

== Career ==
=== Singing ===
Patrick Girondi has been a singer-songwriter, performing since the age of six. In 1998, Girondi and Ken Barnard of Street Factory Music began honing his singing and songwriting skills. His first commercial single, "Colpo Di Cuore" was released on Street Factory Records in 2002. It also appeared on his debut CD, Orphan’s Soul.

Girondi's sophomore release, Orphan’s Journey, appeared in the musical score of the Italian film, Focaccia Blues. Orphan’s Journey earned him the "International Indie Artist of The Year Award" in 2007, as voted by the Indie Music Writers Association. Subsequent albums include: Orphan's Hope(2010), Orphan’s Cure (2015), Orphan’s Return (2020), and Orphan’s Final Chapter (2023). The CDs have been distributed in 20 countries. In 2008, his song “It’s Your Time” won an award at the Giffoni Film Festival in Italy.

Girondi has performed throughout the US and Italy, from intimate venues, to large summer festivals. He has performed at The Harris Theater in Chicago and Navy Pier where musicians like Tony Bennett, and Boz Scaggs have also performed. During his ’08’ US Tour, he performed with the alto saxophonist, Ronnie Graham and shared the stage with Ramsey Lewis, Gerey Johnson and Mike Logan, along with The Ultimate Concept Band and The Mad Hatter.

Girondi performed at The Narni Black Festival at the Teatro Communale and RossoBastardo Live in Italy, where he was featured with artists ranging from Earth, Wind & Fire to Gloria Gaynor, Dionne Warwick and Kool & the Gang. He has appeared on television shows in Chicago, New York City and Italy. His CDs feature well known artists like Antonella Pepe, Gianni Trevisani, Lorenzo Poli and Raffaele Chiatto who have appeared on CDs by Eros Ramazzotti, Claudio Baglioni, and Umberto Tozzi. He performed in Manhattan at Pianos (2023) benefiting the Cooley’s Anemia International, INC. and continues to exhibit internationally.

=== Discography ===
Year	Work
2004	Orphan’s Soul
2008	Orphan’s Journey
2010	Orphan’s Hope
2015	Orphan’s Cure
2020	Orphan’s Return
2023	Orphan’s Final Chapter

=== Filmography ===
In 2026, Girondi wrote, produced, and acted in Resurrection, starring Joe Mantegna, Ronnie Marmo, and directed by Brian Connors.

=== Writing ===
Girondi published his first book under the name Patrick Finley in 1986. In May 2022, Skyhorse Publishing and distributors Simon and Schuster came out with Girondi’s book Flight of the Rondone: High School Dropout VS Big Pharma: The Fight to Save My Son’s Life. This was a Wall Street Journal #1 Bestseller in July 2022. Girondi’s second book to be published by Skyhorse (February 2023) is titled New City: A Story About Race Baiting and Hope on the South Side of Chicago.

=== Business ===
Patrick Girondi was a well-known Chicago trader and a trader in the electronic markets in Europe. In 1993 he founded Errant Gene Therapeutics, which became San Rocco Therapeutics in January 2022. From 1995 to 2004 Girondi was a partner of the late John T. Walton.

Girondi has won accolades for his work in the Orphan Disease field and in particular for his work for the Gene therapy cure for Sickle Cell Anemia and Thalassemia. He has been a guest on the "Oprah Show" twice, and has been on the front page business section of the New York Times in October 2015.

== Personal life ==
Girondi is legally separated from his wife and mother of their three children, Rocco, Francesco and Giancarlo since October 2003.

== Awards ==
- 2007 - International Indie Artist of The Year Award
- 2008 - Giffoni Film festival award for video, "It's your Time" 2008
- 2009 - Award, Pugliese dell'Anno, with Director Michele Placido
- 2009 - Award from Cooley’s Anemia Foundation
- 2010 - Golden Globe winner for song, "Flim Flam Man" and "It's Your Time" used in Golden Globe winning film "Focaccia Blues" awards presented in Rome and the Egyptian in Hollywood.
- 2011 - Independent Video of the year for "Living without You" (Italy)
- 2011 - Award from Cooley’s Anemia International
- 2012 - Award from UN Organization Thalassemia International Foundation
- 2012 - Award from India Thalassemia Foundation
- 2016 - Award, Corp America, CEO of the Year, Errant Gene Therapeutics
- 2020 - Nomination and induction, Accademia di Sicilia, Palermo, Sicily
- 2022 - Chosen One of L.A.’s 100 Most Fascinating People by Best of Los Angeles Award Community
