= The Sims Online =

2002 massively multiplayer online game

- Developer: Maxis
- Publisher: EA Games
- Producers: Margaret Ng; Virginia Ellen McArthur
- Designers: Will Wright; Chris Trottier; Jenna Chalmers
- Programmers: Jeff Lind; Greg Kearney
- Artist: Bob King
- Composer: Jerry Martin
- Series: The Sims
- Platform: Windows
- Release: NA: December 17, 2002
- Genre: Massively multiplayer online social simulation
- Mode: Multiplayer

The Sims Online was a 2002 massively multiplayer online game (MMO) developed by Maxis and published by Electronic Arts (EA) for Microsoft Windows. The game was a subscription-based online multiplayer version of the 2000 Maxis game The Sims, in which players could interact with others on virtual user-made lots, buy and customise properties, and make in-game money by taking on jobs. The Sims Online was the project of Maxis founder and Sims creator Will Wright, who sought to create an open-ended online game based on social interaction, with ambitions for the game to be a platform for emergent gameplay and the creation of virtual societies and politics. In line with these ambitions and the prior commercial success of The Sims, The Sims Online received considerable pre-release coverage, with expectations that it would be successful and break new ground for online multiplayer games.

Released following a two-month public beta, The Sims Online was met with mixed reviews from critics. Reviewers generally praised the game's social features, but found the game to lack the depth and appeal of The Sims, with many describing it as similar to a chat room. The overemphasis of jobs and money-making in the game was particularly critiqued due to the limited, repetitive and time-consuming nature of these activities in overall gameplay. The game similarly fared poorly commercially, underperforming press, industry and publisher expectations for the success of the game. The game also courted controversy, with its open-ended approach to social interaction leading to organised player harassment and simulated cybersex. The player count of The Sims Online peaked at slightly over 100,000 players in 2003, a modest number compared to other popular multiplayer games of the time. In March 2007, EA announced that the product would be re-branded as EA-Land, introducing several major enhancements to the game. Within several weeks, EA announced the game would shut down, and closed the servers on August 1, 2008. The Sims Online has retrospectively been viewed as a failed experiment, with its failure attributed to its limited features, repetitive gameplay and subscription fee. A free fan-made reimplementation of The Sims Online, titled FreeSO, was available from 2017 to 2024.

== Gameplay ==
Similar to The Sims, The Sims Online is an open-ended game that allows players to create and control virtual people, named Sims, with other player and non-player characters, in a virtual neighborhood where they can make money to buy objects and build homes and venues to live in and to interact with other Sims.

=== Sim and neighborhood setup ===
Players setup the game by selecting a city and creating a sim. Cities represent persistent servers with different players; each player may have one sim per city with a total of three sims. Creating a sim is similar to The Sims, with control over name, gender, and appearance. Once the sim is created, a player enters the city view of the selected city, divided into neighborhoods which feature a grid of properties. Players can use a search, browser and map filters to locate existing properties, including by attributes including their popularity and category. As in The Sims, players are required to manage their sim's needs whilst on a lot by keeping their eight individual motive levels high, which include hunger, comfort, hygiene, bladder, energy, fun, social, and room. The Sims Online features a similar skill progression system to The Sims, with some modifications. Skills improve players' ability to generate an income using skill objects. Skill progression is accelerated by the number of people progressing the same skill at the same time in a lot. Skills also degrade over time based on the total number of skill points earned.

=== Social interaction ===
The Sims Online integrates social features that allow players to interact with others. Players can search, bookmark, and locate other players in their neighborhood by name in the city view. This view also provides a top 100 list of the most successful sims and properties in the neighborhood by various categories. The relationships between players are visually depicted in a friendship web, which depicts the player's network of friends, enemies and acquaintances. These statuses are manually set by players.

Relationships are indirectly measured by a relationship score that increases and decreases along with the daily and lifetime interactions a player has with another. Players have also several modes of social interaction inside and outside of properties. Messages can be sent through the user interface to specific players, which turns into a real-time chat if both players are online. If both players are on the same property, they can interact using an open text chat creating speech bubbles to nearby players. Players can also select animated gestures and interactions, with more earned by progressing skills above a certain level or having a higher relationship score. Some gestures and interactions are mutual and require both players to accept before proceeding. Players can manage unwanted behaviour by ignoring the player, removing their text in chat, or banning them from the lot if owned by the player.

=== Making money and managing property ===
Player properties in The Sims Online can be inhabited by other players as visitors or roommates.

Simoleans are the main commodity in The Sims Online, used to purchase lots and objects and design buildings. There are several other sources of income for players. Passive sources of income include a daily 'visitor bonus' based on the number of minutes that visitors spend in the lot, and an 'achievement bonus' for being on the game's top ranking lists. Players with properties also can set several items that allow others to pay them an income, including tip jars, fees for vending machines and pay-to-enter doors. The primary source of income for players is using job objects, some job objects produce items of value accumulated at a rate based on the player's skill level and number of other players simultaneously producing items which can be traded or sold for a profit. These objects are based upon a single skill requirement. Other job objects require multiple players to participate, and feature minigames with a payout based on the efficiency of the players, including games to navigate mazes, guess the correct letters in a code, and create a pizza with the largest variation in ingredients. These objects often have multiple skill requirements at different levels, requiring players to find others with compatible skills.

Players purchase and manage properties in a different manner to The Sims. Players select a vacant lot located in a neighborhood, with property values affected by the location and size. Players that own a property can invite roommates to inhabit them. Roommates have the ability to add or remove their own objects and manage visitors, but can't manage the inhabitants or the size of the property. The owner's user interface provides additional pages that allow them to manage inhabitants, such as lists of admitted and banned users. Property pages in the game's city view provide key information of a property, including its residents and property type.

== Development and release ==
=== Development and release ===
The Sims Online was taking The Sims into a giant, shared world. It was kind of Darwinian: who can build the coolest place that the others want to hang out in? I wanted the social structures to be as emergent as possible.

— Will Wright, Wired

The Sims Online was conceived by Maxis lead designer and creator of The Sims, Will Wright, who envisioned future games would be online as the "norm rather than the exception", and proposed the concept of an online Sims game to Maxis in 2000. Delivering a keynote speech at the 2001 Game Developers Conference, Wright revealed initial concepts and screenshots for The Sims Online, outlining an aim for the game to imitate and represent real-life social networks as "an interactive exploration of the emerging social web" and based upon the "social topography" created and explored by players. Wright also attributed conversations with author Neal Stephenson and his 1992 novel Snow Crash as inspiration for the game, with its notion of a metaverse also emerging as a comparison point for publishers and reviewers. To reinforce the idea of an open-ended virtual environment, Wright conceived the game would be "thematically empty" upon release, with its settings and social dynamics to be created by players with minimal guidance from the game.

To realise Wright's concept, the development team aimed to create an online game with The Sims engine that encouraged interaction between players, and provide a broader business and economic simulation built from this premise. Initially pitched as a smaller matchmaking client where players could visit each other's houses, suggestions by EA and Maxis to focus the game on a subscription model led to development of a larger online game. The team, which initially had little to no experience creating massively multiplayer online games, encountered challenges and delays in creating and scaling tools and processes from a game originally intended as a single-player experience. Ultima Online developer Gordon Walton joined Maxis to provide experience on designing online games. The team also featured a larger representation of women for the time reflecting the majority female audience of The Sims franchise, commended by the ELSPA as a "success story" for the female games industry workforce. The undisclosed development budget for The Sims Online was estimated by industry insiders to be $25 million. EA announced the release of a public beta in October 2002.

Prior to release, The Sims Online received significant pre-release coverage and high expectations as a potential commercial and cultural phenomenon, following the showcase of the game at E3 in May 2002. Featured as a cover article on Newsweek, the game was hailed as a "step forward for online games" and an emerging "forum for social interaction". Lev Grossman of Time described the upcoming title as a "daring collective social experiment" to simulate a "vast virtual society" and "sandbox where we can play out our fantasies and confront our fears about what America might become". Some noted the novelty of an MMO that did not feature a fantasy theme in contrast to popular MMO games of the time, including EverQuest and Ultima Online, with speculation that its general appeal could "bring multiplayer online gaming to the masses". Others expressed caution about the game's high expectations, with Chris Morris of CNN noting the commercial risk due to the poor performance of previous EA online games Motor City Online and Majestic, and the "looming question of whether casual gamers will be willing to pay a monthly fee". The Sims Online was launched on 17 December 2002 to coincide with the Christmas period. The release was accompanied by a kitsch-themed launch party organized by EA and held in New York at the Altman Building.

=== Controversy ===
The Sims Online was subject to controversy due to the behaviors of some of its user base, prompting commentary on whether these behaviours consisted of virtual crime. Many critics noted the unexpected adult behavior of the game at release, with critics observing the game had a "sleazy" and "off-color" tone due to the risqué theme of the franchise, and commonly encountered flirting, sex, and users operating virtual brothels offering sex in exchange for simoleons. This had not been entirely unexpected; Wright had previously stated the developers were "counting on" players to create "bordellos and whatever else they can imagine" with the game's open-ended tools. Players also discovered that the relationship system could be abused by threatening to label the reputation of others as untrustworthy, with cases spanning from targeted harassment to widespread, co-ordinated efforts by a Mafia of players who would extort victims and properties.

Public attention was further brought to these issues by Peter Ludlow, a University of Michigan philosophy professor, who operated an online blog titled The Alphaville Herald that frequently canvassed the activities of the inhabitants on the server of the same name. Under the pseudonym Urizenus, Ludlow observed, wrote about, and interviewed users engaging in practices including scams, sadomasochism, prostitution, and organised crime. Of particular concern was a reported griefer, Evangeline, who claimed to be a seventeen-year-old male who operated a brothel offering virtual sex services in the game. Ludlow, among other academics, noted the ethical grey area of these activities, although the potential of "real money" being exchanged for simoleons opened up issues around the "exploitation" of users. Ludlow's account on The Sims Online was banned by EA on the basis that he had included a link to his website in his player profile, raising mainstream commentary on the merits of Ludlow's reporting, the potential harms of virtual crime, and the adequacy of moderation in the game.

=== Post-release content and EA-Land ===
Following release, the development team used surveys, feedback and demographic studies on the player base to plan a growth strategy for the game, aiming to provide more specific goals and activities, enhance the social aspects of the game, and integrating more features from The Sims into the game. Initial features added by the development team included clothing racks to customise outfits, a player trading feature, non-player characters that provide services, and pets from The Sims Unleashed; however, the introduction of the clothing rack also introduced an exploit into the game that allowed players to generate large amounts of money. Despite being fixed, the exploit led to hyperinflation and permanently impacted the game's virtual economy.

In February 2008, EA announced that The Sims Online would be relaunched as a free-to-play reworked version titled EA-Land. The launch was the product of ongoing development from a small development team led by EA studio head Luc Barthelet from 2007 under the initial name TSO-E, designed as a single, merged city. As part of this process, several features were introduced into the game, including the introduction of the ability for players to upload custom content into the game, and the integration of web and social media features, including Facebook apps and user-created widgets. The relaunch announcement was met with an unenthusiastic reception; Jim Rossignol of Rock Paper Shotgun described the relaunch as "horribly rebranded" and "buzzwordery", and Eurogamer didn't "understand any of it".

=== Closure ===
On 29 April 2008, weeks after the relaunch of the game, EA announced the EA-Land service would be shut down from 1 August. The announcement was met with disappointment from users, with Barthelet noting the difficult and "particularly complex" reasons for ending the service weeks after relaunch. EA-Land shut down at 4:35am PST on 1 August 2008. To commemorate the closure, EA developers held a 'See You Soon' party where players congregated until the shutdown of the game. The final moments of the game at this party were recorded by Henry Lowood's research team as part of Archiving Virtual Worlds and Preserving Virtual Worlds, two Congress-funded projects to investigate and develop measures to archive software content.

== Reception ==
Reception

Aggregate score
| Aggregator | Score |
|---|---|
| Metacritic | 70% |

Review scores
| Publication | Score |
|---|---|
| AllGame | 3/5 |
| Computer Games Magazine | 4/5 |
| Computer Gaming World | 3/5 |
| Game Informer | 9/10 |
| GameRevolution | C− |
| GameSpot | 6.7 |
| GameSpy | 60% |
| GameZone | 7.3 |
| IGN | 7.2 |
| PC Zone | 72% |

Awards
| Publication | Award |
|---|---|
| 2002 E3 Game Critics Awards | Best Simulation Game |
| 6th Annual Interactive Achievement Awards | Massively Multiplayer/Persistent World Game of the Year |

=== Sales ===
The Sims Online was a commercial disappointment, peaking in sixth place in United States PC sales charts in December 2002. At launch, the game sold 105,000 units, a quarter of its production shipment. By early 2003, the game was reported as having between 80,000 and 85,000 subscribers at launch, 40,000 of whom remained on a free trial. Citing an "error on expectations" for sales, EA immediately dropped the retail price of the game from $49.99 to $29.99. The subscription base, which remained under 100,000 for most of 2003, underperformed industry expectations, and fell short of EA goals of reaching 200,000 by March and 400,000 subscribers by the end of the year. Analyst Bruce Woodcock estimated active player subscriptions for The Sims Online peaked near 105,000 in 2003, sharply declining in the years after.

=== Reviews ===
The Sims Online received "mixed to average" review scores according to review aggregator Metacritic. Reviewers generally praised the social networking features of the game, with several comparing it to the functionality of a chat room. Describing the game as a "chat room come to life', Michael Lafferty of GameZone considered the interactive social gameplay to be a highlight of The Sims Online due to the diversity of the player base. A. A. White of Game Revolution commended the "realized" and "excellent" integration of in-game instant messaging and email. Jessica Theon of Computer Games praised the game's design and social features in encouraging player co-operation, although she found the map and search function making it difficult to navigate to find others. Game Informer enjoyed the communal aspect of the game, but wished there were more gameplay options than "mindless genial interaction". Scott Steinberg of PC Zone highlighted the game's "unique approach to massive online play" and focus of the game mechanics to "bring people together", but found the lack of a chat log made it difficult to monitor and continue conversations. Several critics also discussed the negative aspects of player interaction. Steve Butts of IGN noted the gameplay was open to "confusion" and "abuse", observing easy ways to exploit the property manager system. Dana Jongewaard of Computer Gaming World found players were generally unwilling to interact in gameplay and were primarily focused on making money. In contrast, Jessica Theon of Computer Games found players to be "incredibly friendly and helpful".

Many critics questioned the merits of the game's changes compared to The Sims. Steve Butts of IGN noted the gameplay lacked "challenge and conflict" due to the individual focus of gameplay and less scripted nature of other players. T. J. Deci of Allgame considered the social mechanics to detract from the appeal of The Sims, citing the lack of player customisation to differentiate players. Dana Jongewaard of Computer Gaming World noted the design of The Sims Online omitted large aspects of the original game, including its events, careers, and special characters. A. A. White of Game Revolution noted the game's greater emphasis on collective activities was effective, but reduced the uniqueness of individual sims, their interests and personality traits. Scott Steinberg of PC Zone lamented the absence of the "little details" from The Sims, such as disasters.

The game's business simulation mechanics were also critiqued. Steve Butts of IGN noted that the lack of a "player-run market of commodities and items" limited the incentive of focusing on the money-making aspects of the game. GameSpot similarly cited the functionality of the economy as a problem for the game, finding skill building and money making activities to be limited and repetitive. A. A. White of Game Revolution found the money-making activities generic, "non-interactive", and limited in progression, leading to an "intense emphasis on drudgery" and the proliferation of "sweatshop" lots on the game to facilitate money-making. Carla Harker of GameSpy similarly described them as a "boring", "time-consuming", and "repetitive chore". Describing money as the "downfall of the game", Scott Steinberg of PC Zone noted the job objects to dominant player participation and interaction, stating "the emphasis on cash and beauty leaves the game unbalanced, offering little reward to the player who wants to pursue a different path".

=== Retrospective reception ===
Initial post-release reception of The Sims Online evaluated the game as falling far below the cultural, commercial and critical impact of The Sims, with some labelling the game as a failure. Early assessments from analysts suggested the game's disappointing performance arose from a late December release too close to Christmas, poor reviews, and a limited time from announcement to release to generate support for a subscription service. Computer Gaming World assessed that whilst the game was meant to be a "breakthrough" game, "players stayed away in droves". Several authors categorized The Sims Online as part of a trend of failed launches of massively multiplayer online games in the early millennium.

Many writers attempted to assess the reasons for the underperformance of The Sims Online. Henry Jenkins and Kurt Squire of Computer Games cited the game's difficulties in attracting a "diverse player base" and "role-playing and storytelling community" due to the medium of a massively multiplayer online game being "expensive" and "time-intensive" for players to maintain. Dan Whitehead of Eurogamer wrote that the mixture of pre-broadband performance issues and lack of infrastructure failed to "support the infinitely malleable persistent virtual world The Sims required". Describing the game as an "imperfect" transition of The Sims, Steen et al. attributed the underperformance of the game to the "disassociation" between the idea of the player as an avatar and the dissatisfying social and economic gameplay mechanics that dominated the online experience, creating a "chilling effect" on natural social interaction. Dan Morris of PC Gamer stated the game needed a "well-defined narrative, not just a sandbox". Graham Smith of Rock Paper Shotgun described the game as a "mess", citing the vulnerability of its player-driven economy to bugs and the unscrupulous nature of players. Leah Williams of Kotaku noted the game was a "bold experiment" with a sound concept, but "faded quickly" due to the newness of the internet, the lack of players and available features, and constant development changes. Describing the game as a "letdown", video game historian Phil Salvador assessed that whilst the concept "should have worked", the game's economic features were "a constant grind" with "non-existent" entertainment venues, but noted that "its communal work interactions anticipated the sort of social games that are popular today".

== Legacy ==
Developers of The Sims Online retrospectively shared views that the game was a disappointment. Will Wright believes that the game's lack of success was due to the online subscription model not fitting with The Sims' core audience. He has observed that Online was "a very different game", and that many of the constraints of the game came from the limitations of creating a multiplayer online game. Executive producer Gordon Walton stated that the game was not shipped with the complete features envisioned by the development team due to time constraints, writing "not having a fully functioning economy and more fun activities ... made the game less appealing than we wanted". Although later added in EA-Land, The Sims developer Don Hopkins considered the initial lack of support for player-created content was also a major factor in the game's failure. Associate producer Jessica Lewis speculated the game's higher price and subscription fee at launch deterred some consumers, who could purchase expansion packs for The Sims for cheaper. The Sims 2, a single-player title and sequel to The Sims, was developed by Maxis and published by EA in 2004. Sims 2 producer Tim LeTourneau assessed that The Sims Online was "ahead of its time" even though it "never resonated as strongly as the regular Sims game did".

The Sims Online frequently arose in discussions about online integration in future Sims titles, with journalists noting the failure of the game suggested the unpopularity of the concept. The Sims Online was also noted to foreshadow later business practices by EA to increase online integration and monetization of the Sims franchise. In 2011, EA published the online game The Sims Social on Facebook, which featured similar social networking features on the platform. Following negative feedback to the online integration of the 2013 title SimCity, EA announced The Sims 4 would be "an offline, client-based game". In discussing the future direction of the Sims franchise in 2020, EA CEO Andrew Wilson noted The Sims Online had been influential in the studio's approach to considering how "social interactions and competitive elements" could be integrated into the gameplay experience for future Sims titles.

=== FreeSO ===
FreeSO, a free fan-made recreation of The Sims Online created by developer Rhys Simpson in C# and MonoGame, was launched in open beta on 6 January 2017. The game is a non-commercial, legal re-implementation of The Sims Online, acting as a client to read the game's original assets, and has been approved by EA. Simpson had developed the game from July 2016, seeking to "recapture the feeling" of The Sims Online. Initially featuring a shared area named Sunrise Crater that accommodated 200 users, demand for the beta was so high that the servers crashed under a load of 1,000 accounts. FreeSO was shut down in December 2024 after being online for nearly eight years.
