= Nanatsu Kaze no Shima Monogatari =

1997 video game

- Developer: Givro Corporation
- Publisher: Enix
- Designer: Norihiro Sawada
- Programmer: Noriyuki Tomiyama
- Artists: Keita Amemiya; Naoyuki Hayakawa; Yasuo Wakatsuki
- Composers: Hirokazu Ohta (Buddy Zoo); Shinji Kinoshita (Buddy Zoo)
- Platform: Sega Saturn
- Release: JP: 27 November, 1997
- Genre: Graphic adventure
- Mode: Single-player

Nanatsu Kaze no Shima Monogatari (Note: Japanese: 七ツ風の島物語; lit. "The Seven Blasts of Wind in Island Story" or "The Tale of Seven Winds Island") is a 1997 graphic adventure video game developed by Givro Corporation and published by Enix for the Sega Saturn. The last game to be created by Givro prior to their dissolution in 1998, it takes place on a mysterious island. Players assume the role of a dragon named Gaūpu to meet various creatures inhabiting the location, while harnessing seven legendary winds to overcome obstacles. It received positive reviews, with high praise given towards its hand-drawn visuals.

== Gameplay ==
Gameplay screenshot.

Nanatsu Kaze no Shima Monogatari is a graphic adventure game reminiscent of earlier titles from Givro like Wonder Project J and Wonder Project J2 on Super Famicom and Nintendo 64 respectively, where players assume the role of a dragon named Gaūpu who falls into a mysterious island and must meet various creatures that inhabit the location, some of which will join Gaūpu's quest or give information, collect items while harnessing seven legendary winds to overcome challenges along the way. Gameplay is largely free of violence and focuses on puzzle solving instead. Players collect a variety of items such as insects, plants and fish, which can be used for certain purposes. Characters like the giant snail Soul and the trader Tamu provides hints in the form of ambiguous poems and gives items to Gaūpu respectively. By using a sea conch item, Gaūpu can summon companions to clear obstacles in order explore previously unreachable areas of the island.

== Production ==
=== Development ===
Developed by Givro Corporation, it was the last game the company developed.

== Release ==
Nanatsu Kaze no Shima Monogatari was published by Enix for the Sega Saturn on November 27, 1997. It was never released outside of Japan. The title was released with two discs; one featuring the main game while another features artwork and character designs. In December, an official strategy guide was released in Japan by Enix. Likewise, an album containing music from the title was co-published in Japan by First Smile Entertainment and Pony Canyon on December 17 of the same year.

== Reception ==
Reception

Review scores
Publication	Score
Famitsu	7/10, 8/10, 8/10, 6/10
Joypad	98%
Saturn Fan	(SS) 6.4/10
Sega Saturn Magazine (JP)	7.00/10

Three reviewers for the Japanese Sega Saturn Magazine gave it a 9, 4, and a 6 score, for an average of 7. Grégoire Hellot of French magazine Joypad gave it a 98%. 1UP.com's Todd Ciolek called it one of the most gorgeous 2D games ever created. Anthony John Agnello at Engadget compared it as a mix of puzzle solving titles like King's Quest and platforming games like Castlevania.
