= Wonder Project (disambiguation) =

The Wonder Project is an American faith-based film and television studio.

Wonder Project may also refer to:

- Wonder Project J, the 1994 video game
- Wonder Project J2, the 1996 video game
- The Wonder Project, an initiative by Engineering New Zealand to engage students in STEM
