= Mazin Saga: Mutant Fighter =

1993 video game

- Developer: Almanic Corporation (Note: Additional work by ALU and Team "Saga".)
- Publishers: JP/EU: Sega; NA: Vic Tokai
- Directors: Satsuki Mizuno; Takashi Yoneda; Tommy Bon Bon
- Producer: Kenzi Nagai
- Designer: Takashi Nagai
- Programmer: Yōji Iwashita
- Artists: Hidetoshi Fujioka; Naoyuki Hayakawa; Takehito Suzuki
- Composer: Kazuo Sawa
- Series: Mazinger
- Platform: Sega Genesis
- Release: JP: 26 February 1993; EU: July 1993; NA: October 1993
- Genres: Beat 'em up, fighting
- Mode: Single-player

Mazin Saga: Mutant Fighter (Note: Also known as MazinSaga (Note: Japanese: マジンサーガ, Hepburn: MajinSāga) in Japan and Mazin Wars in Europe.) is a 1993 hybrid beat 'em up/fighting video game developed by Almanic Corporation, in conjunction with ALU and Team "Saga", and published by Sega for the Sega Genesis/Mega Drive in Japan and Europe and later in North America by Vic Tokai. Based upon Go Nagai's MazinSaga mecha manga, which is considered a combination of Nagai's Mazinger and Devilman franchises, players assume the role of Koji Kabuto wielding the Mazinger Z armor to fight against powerful 'Bio Beasts' led by God Kaiser Hell. Co-directed by Satsuki Mizuno, Takashi Yoneda and "Tommy Bon Bon", the title was created by most of the same team that worked on previous projects at Almanic such as E.V.O.: Search for Eden. It was met with mostly positive reception from critics since its release.

== Gameplay ==

Top: Beat 'em up segment.
Bottom: Garuda-K7 boss fight.

Mazin Saga: Mutant Fighter is a cross-genre game that blends side-scrolling beat 'em up and fighting playstyles where players take control of Koji Kabuto wielding the Mazinger Z armor through six stages, each one set in a different location across the world, to fight against enemies and powerful 'Bio Beasts' led by God Kaiser Hell. At the title screen, the player has access to the options menu where the difficulty settings can be adjusted between two levels.

Stages are split into four sections; the first three see Kabuto using the Mazinger Z armor in a beat 'em up format and the fourth sees Mazinger Z as a giant robot to battle the boss of that stage in a one-on-one encounter. During beat 'em up segments, Kabuto has the ability to execute special moves that deals damage to enemies on-screen by performing certain button combinations. Most of the fighting is physical and Kabuto can run and perform dashing attacks. Players can also collect items scattered along the way such as money, health and 1UPs.

During the boss segment, gameplay changes to a fighting game format. The player must fight against the stage boss by depleting the opponent's health bar in order to progress further. As with the beat 'em up segments, players can perform button combinations to execute special moves damage the boss, although moveset differs from those in the beat 'em up format.

== Synopsis ==
Mazin Saga: Mutant Fighter is based upon Go Nagai's MazinSaga mecha manga, which is considered a combination of Nagai's Mazinger and Devilman franchises, with characters from the original Mazinger Z series reprising their roles in MazinSaga albeit slightly different from their anime/manga counterparts. Set in a different universe from the original Mazinger plot, the story begins in the year 1999 when God Kaiser Hell began an all-out invasion to control Earth using powerful giants known as 'Bio Beasts'.

== Development ==
Mazin Saga: Mutant Fighter was developed, with additional support from ALU and Team "Saga", by most of the same team that worked on previous projects at Almanic Corporation such as E.V.O.: Search for Eden, with Satsuki Mizuno, Takashi Yoneda and a person under the pseudonym "Tommy Bon Bon" acting as co-directors. Kenzi Nagai also acted as producer, while both Takashi Nagai and Yōji Iwashita served as lead programmer and designer respectively. Artists Hidetoshi Fujioka, Naoyuki Hayakawa, Takehito Suzuki and Yasuo Wakatsuki created the pixel art, while Kunio-kun composer Kazuo Sawa scored the soundtrack and made the sound effects. Other people collaborated in its development as well.

== Reception and legacy ==
Reception

Review scores
Publication	Score
Computer and Video Games	63/100
Electronic Gaming Monthly	36/50
GamePro	12.5/20
GamesMaster	81%
Beep! Mega Drive	7.0/10
Computer+Videogiochi	90/100
Hippon Super!	75/100
Mean Machines Sega	87/100
Mega	65%
Mega Drive Advanced Gaming	73%
Mega Force	90%
Mega Fun	74%
MegaTech	90%
Play Time	81/100
Player One	90%
Sega Force	65/100
Sega Power	76%
Sega Pro	81%
Super Game	26/30
Supersonic	91%
Video Games	62%

Award
Publication	Award
MegaTech (1993)	Hyper Game Award (Megadrive)

MegaTech gave the game 90% and a Hyper Game Award. Mega gave the game 65%, saying that it was not as good as Streets of Rage 2.

Former Treasure member Tetsuhiko Kikuchi was inspired by Mazin Saga: Mutant Fighter to program the enemies manually rather than with mathematical algorithms during development of Gunstar Heroes.
