= Wolf (video game) =

1994 video game

- Cover art (edited version)
- Developer: Manley & Associates
- Publishers: NA: Sanctuary Woods; EU: U.S. Gold
- Designers: Ivan Manley; Sam Palahnuk; David Hasle
- Platform: MS-DOS
- Release: NA: September 1994; EU: 1995
- Genre: Life simulation
- Mode: Single-player

Wolf is a life simulation game for MS-DOS published in 1995 by Sanctuary Woods. The player takes on the role of a wolf. It was followed by Lion in 1995.

== Gameplay ==
The gameplay is divided into two parts. The first is a sandbox mode, where the player has no predetermined goal. The second is a scenario mode, where the player has to complete specific actions; this is comparable to quests given in RPGs.

== Reception ==
Reception

Review scores
Publication	Score
Computer Gaming World	4/5
PC Gamer (US)	88%
Electronic Entertainment	5/5
Computer Player	8 out of 10
CyberSurfer	2/5
PC Magazine	3/4

Awards
Publication	Award
PC Gamer US	Special Achievement in Innovative Design
Electronic Entertainment	Best Simulation Game
Computer Gaming World	Role-Playing Game of the Year (runner-up)

In Electronic Entertainment, Joel Enos wrote that Wolf's "unique take on role-playing/simulation games puts it in a class by itself". He concluded, "You'll not only spend many happy hours playing, you might even learn something." The magazine later named Wolf its 1994 "Best Simulation Game". The editors reiterated that the game is "great fun to play, and you also can't help but learn about these intriguing creatures as you step into their skin."

Vince DeNardo of Computer Gaming World called Wolf "a role-playing simulation that is both worthwhile for your children, and for the child that lies within each of us." He believed that it is "a novel concept backed up by solid execution", and that it "redefines the genre of Role-Playing as we gamers know it". Computer Gaming World went on to nominate Wolf as its 1994 "Role-Playing Game of the Year", with the editors calling it an innovative product that "skillfully mixes role-playing elements and scientific fact".

The reviewer for PC Gamer US remarked that "hours pass like minutes in this fascinating RPG for nature lovers", and summarized it as an "unusual, entertaining game that gives genuine insight into one of nature's most magnificent and misunderstood creatures." The magazine's editors later awarded Wolf their 1994 "Special Achievement in Innovative Design". They wrote that the game is "both entertaining and enlightening — and a breath of fresh air in a genre [role-playing games] that some say has run its course."

Computer Player's Peter Suciu summarized it as "a nice novelty game without a lot to it", and questioned its target audience. He wrote that Wolf would be "quite upsetting" to children; however, he found the game too shallow for adult players outside of its simulation mode, which he in turn thought was missing clear rewards or goals. In a negative review, CyberSurfer's Linda Sharar called the game dull, and agreed with Suciu that its simulation mode lacked incentives to continue playing. She wrote, "I suppose if you look at Wolf as an interactive educational program, it serves its purpose. But as a game—I just don't get it."

== See also ==
- WolfQuest, another wolf life simulator
