= Super NES Mouse =

SNES peripheral

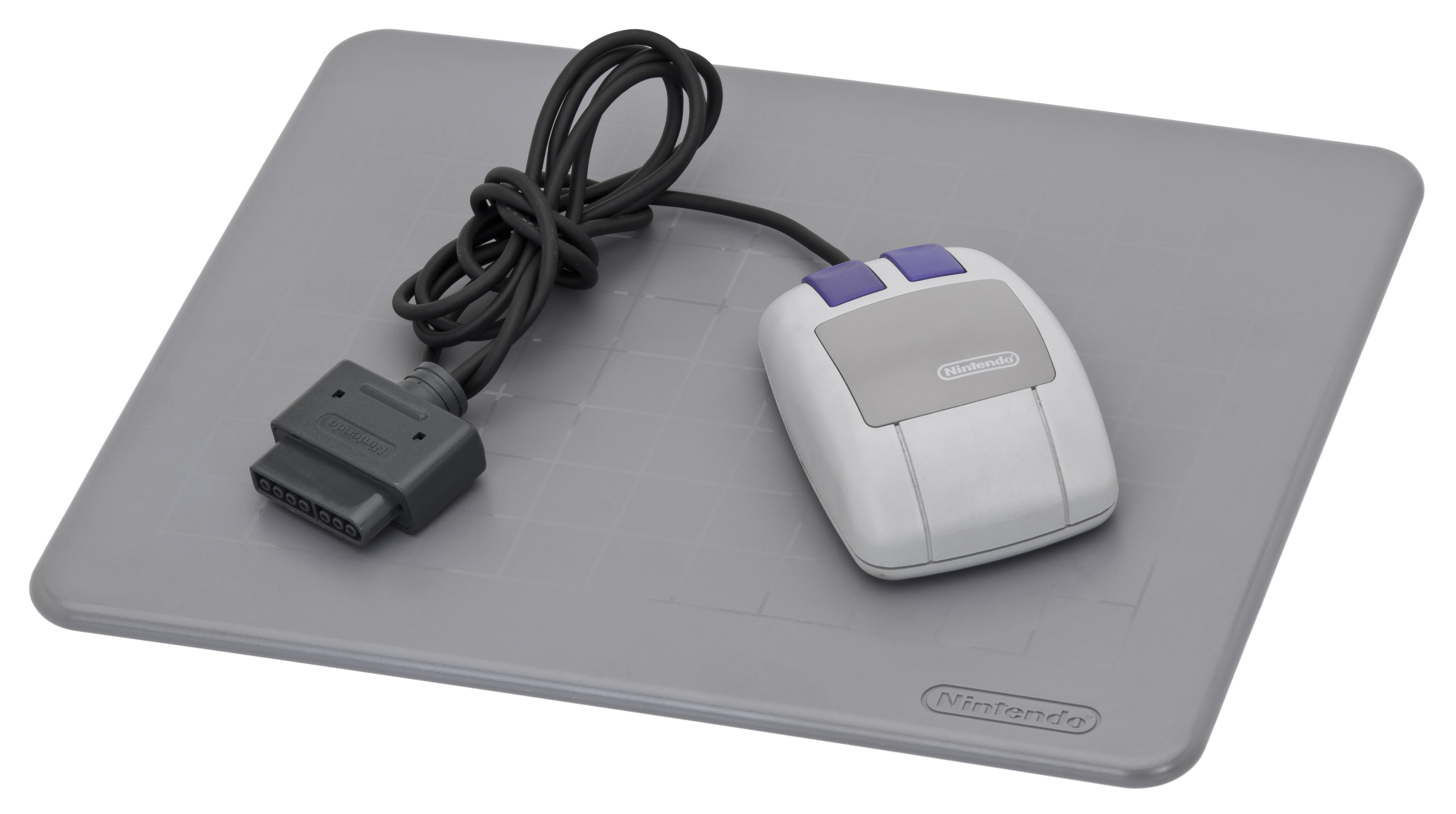
- The Super NES Mouse and mouse pad
- Also known as: Super Famicom Mouse; SNS-016
- Developer: Nintendo
- Manufacturer: Nintendo
- Type: Video game console peripheral
- Generation: Fourth generation
- Released: JP: July 14, 1992; NA: August 17, 1992; EU: December 10, 1992
- Introductory price: $29.95
- Media: Input device
- Connectivity: Super NES controller port
- Dimensions: 98 mm × 64 mm × 35 mm (3.9 in × 2.5 in × 1.4 in)
- Weight: 140 g (0.31 lb)
- Related: Super Nintendo Entertainment System

The Super NES Mouse, sold as the Super Famicom Mouse (Note: Japanese: スーパーファミコンマウス, Hepburn: Sūpā Famikon Mausu) in Japan, is a peripheral created by Nintendo for the Super Nintendo Entertainment System. It is designed to imitate the functionality of a standard computer mouse to control compatible Super NES games.

The peripheral was originally designed for use with the game Mario Paint (1992), with which it was bundled for sale. During the Super NES's life cycle, over 130 games were released with Mouse support, two of which required it for play.

== Overview ==
The Super NES Mouse was sold in a bundle with Mario Paint, which also included a plastic mousepad. Although the device closely resembles and mimics the functionality of a two-button computer mouse, it is smaller than most computer mice of the time and has a significantly shorter cord than the standard Super NES controller. Due to its proprietary connector, it is not compatible with PC motherboards.

In addition to games, the Super NES Mouse is also compatible with the Super Game Boy, allowing users to draw in the borders of the screen.

== List of compatible games ==
The following is a list of 131 games that support the Super NES Mouse, only 40 of which were released outside of Japan. Certain games released after the Mouse—such as Yoshi's Island and Kirby Super Star—display a warning message indicating that the mouse is incompatible with that game. Two games require the mouse for play, and are marked below in bold.

- AIII S.V.: Take the [A] Train 3 Super Version (Japan only)
- Acme Animation Factory
- Advanced Dungeons & Dragons: Eye of the Beholder
- Alice no Paint Adventure (Japan only)
- Arkanoid: Doh It Again
- Asahi Shinbun Rensai: Katō Ichi-Ni-San Shōgi: Shingiryū (Japan only)
- Asameshimae Nyanko (Japan only)
- The Atlas (Japan only)
- Bishōjo Senshi Sailor Moon S: Kondo wa Puzzle de Oshiokiyo! (Japan only)
- Block Kuzushi (Japan only)
- Brandish 2 (Japan only)
- BreakThru!
- Cannon Fodder (PAL only)
- Chinhai (Japan only)
- Dai-3-ji Super Robot Taisen (Japan only)
- Dai-4-ji Super Robot Taisen (Japan only)
- Date Kimiko no Virtual Tennis (Japan only)
- Dōkyūsei 2 (Japan only)
- Doom
- Dragon Knight 4 (Japan only)
- Dynamaite: The Las Vegas (Japan only)
- F-15 Super Strike Eagle (Japan only)
- Farland Story (Japan only)
- Farland Story 2 (Japan only)
- Fun 'n Games
- Gaia Saver: Hero Saidai no Sakusen (Japan only)
- Galaxy Robo (Japan only)
- Game no Tatsujin (Japan only)
- Game no Tatsujin: The Shanghai (Japan only)
- Habu Meijin no Omoshiro Shōgi (Japan only)
- Hanafuda Ō
- Hayazashi Nidan Morita Shōgi (Japan only)
- Hayazashi Nidan Morita Shogi 2 (Japan only)
- Hiōden: Mamono-tachi tono Chikai (Japan only)
- Honkaku Mahjong - Tetsuman II (Japan only)
- Honkaku Shōgi - Fūunji Ryūō (Japan only)
- Honkakuha Igo - Gosei (Japan only)
- Ihatovo Monogatari (Japan only)
- Illvanian no Shiro (Japan only)
- Itō Haka Rokudan no Shōgi Dōjō (Japan only)
- Jissen Pachi-Slot Hisshōhō (Japan only)
- Jōshō Mahjong Tenpai (Japan only)
- J.R.R. Tolkien's The Lord of the Rings: Volume 1
- Jurassic Park
- Kabukichō Reach Mahjong: Tōpūsen (Japan only)
- Kachiuma Yosō Soft: Baken Renkinjutsu (Japan only)
- Kaite Tsukutte Asoberu: Dezaemon
- Kakinoki Shōgi (Japan only)
- Kikuni Masahiko no Jantōshi Dora Ō (Japan only)
- King Arthur's World
- Kōsoku Shikō: Shōgi Ō (Japan only)
- Kōtetsu no Kishi (Japan only)
- Kōtetsu no Kishi 2: Sabaku no Rommel Shōgun (Japan only)
- Kōtetsu no Kishi 3: Gekitotsu Europe Sensen (Japan only)
- Lamborghini American Challenge
- Lemmings 2: The Tribes
- Lord Monarch (Japan only)
- The Mahjong Tōhaiden (Japan only)
- Majin Tensei (Japan only)
- Mario no Super Picross (Japan only)
- **Mario Paint**
- **Mario & Wario** (Japan only)
- Mario's Early Years: Fun with Letters
- Mario's Early Years: Fun with Numbers
- Mario's Early Years: Preschool Fun
- Masters: Harukanaru Augusta 2 (Japan only)
- Mega lo Mania (PAL only)
- Might and Magic III: Isles of Terra
- Motoko-chan no Wonder Kitchen (Japan only)
- Nichibutsu Collection 2 (Japan only)
- Nobunaga no Yabō: Haōden (Japan only)
- Nobunaga's Ambition
- Olivia no Mystery (Japan only)
- On the Ball
- Operation Thunderbolt
- Oryōri Pon! (Japan only)
- Pieces
- Populous II: Trials of the Olympian Gods (PAL only)
- PowerMonger (PAL/Japan)
- Revolution X
- Rin Kaihō Kudan no Igo Taidō (Japan only)
- Rise of the Phoenix
- Sangokushi Seishi: Tenbu Spirits (Japan only)
- Sanrio Shanghai (Japan only)
- Sgt. Saunders' Combat! (Japan only)
- Shanghai - Banri no Chōjō (Japan only)
- Shanghai III (Japan only)
- Shien's Revenge
- Shin Mahjong (Japan only)
- Shodankurai Nintei: Shodan Pro Mahjong (Japan only)
- Shōgi: Fūrinkazan (Japan only)
- Shōgi Saikyō (Japan only)
- Shōgi Saikyō 2: Jissen Taikyoku Hen (Japan only)
- Shōgi Sanmai (Japan only)
- Sid Meier's Civilization
- SimAnt: The Electronic Ant Colony
- Snoopy Concert (Japan only)
- Super Caesars Palace
- Super Castles (Japan only)
- Super Gomoku Narabe Renju (Japan only)
- Super Gomoku Shōgi (Japan only)
- Super Igo Go Ō (Japan only)
- Super Mahjong 2: Honkaku 4 Nin Uchi! (Japan only)
- Super Nichibutsu Mahjong 2: Zenkoku Seiha Hen (Japan only)
- Super Noah's Ark 3D
- Super Pachi-Slot Mahjong (Japan only)
- Super Robot Taisen EX (Japan only)
- Super Sangokushi (Japan only)
- Super Shōgi 2 (Japan only)
- Super Shōgi 3: Kitaihei (Japan only)
- Super Sōkoban (Japan only)
- Super Solitaire
- Taikyoku Igo: Idaten (Japan only)
- Take Yutaka G1 Memory (Japan only)
- Takemiya Masaki Kudan no Igo Taishō (Japan only)
- T2: The Arcade Game
- Tactical Soccer (Japan only)
- Taikyoku Igo: Goliath (Japan only)
- Tin Star
- Tokimeki Memorial: Densetsu no Ki no Shita de (Japan only)
- Toride (Japan only)
- Troddlers
- Ugoku E Ver. 2.0: Aryol (Japan only)
- Utopia: The Creation of a Nation
- Vegas Stakes
- Winning Post (Japan only)
- Wolfenstein 3D
- Wonder Project J: Kikai no Shōnen Pino (Japan only)
- Yadamon: Wonderland Dream (Japan only)
- Yūjin: Janjū Gakuen (Japan only)
- Zico Soccer (Japan only)

Some games that were planned to use the mouse were never released, including Kid Kirby, Sound Fantasy, SpellCraft: Aspects of Valor, and Warrior of Rome III.

== Reception and legacy ==
The Mario Paint and Mouse package sold more than 1 million units by March 1993.

In 1999, a mouse accessory was released for the Super NES's successor, the Nintendo 64, intended for use with games made for its 64DD accessory. Similar to how the Super NES Mouse was bundled with Mario Paint, the Nintendo 64 Mouse was only available in a bundle with another Mario art program, Mario Artist: Paint Studio.

In 2017, Hyperkin released the Hyper Click Mouse, an aftermarket Super NES mouse that utilizes optical motion detection in place of the rolling ball used in the original model.

Support for Super NES Mouse controls in compatible games was added to the Nintendo Classics emulated game service for Nintendo Switch and Nintendo Switch 2 on July 29, 2025. These games can be controlled using an external USB mouse, or the Joy-Con 2's mouse controls on Nintendo Switch 2.
