= Real Lives =

Real Lives may refer to:

- Real Lives (video game), a 2001 educational video game
- Real Lives (TV channel), a British television channel owned by Sky

== See also ==
- Sky Real Lives, an in-house channel from British Sky Broadcasting
