= Life simulation game =

Subgenre of simulation video games

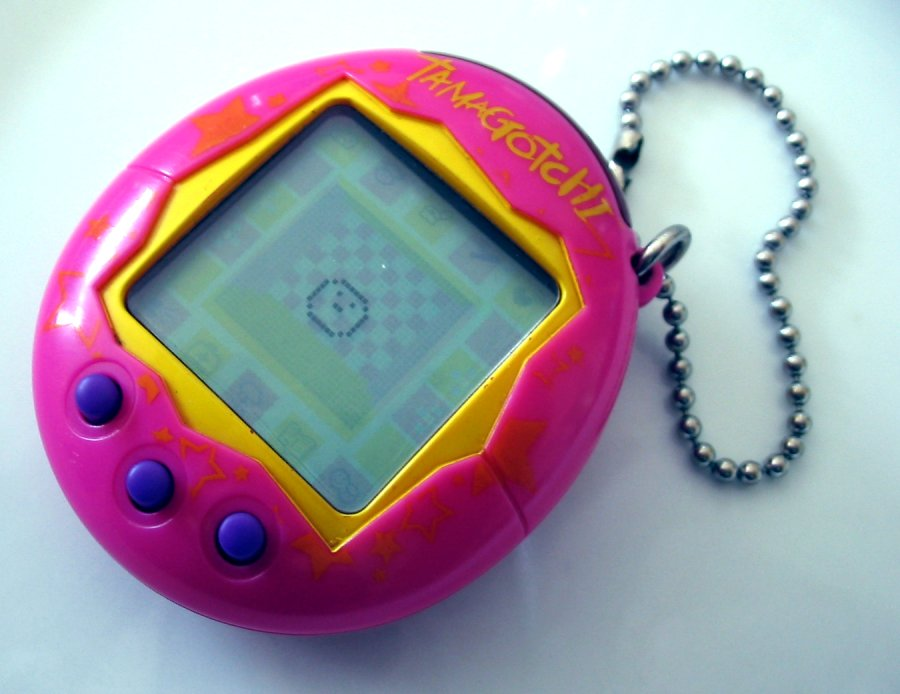
A Tamagotchi virtual pet game

Life simulation games form a subgenre of simulation video games in which the player lives or controls one or more virtual characters (human or otherwise). Such a game can revolve around "individuals and relationships, or it could be a simulation of an ecosystem". Other terms include artificial life game and simulated life game (SLG).

== Definition ==
Life simulation games are about "maintaining and growing a virtual life", where players are given the power to control the lives of autonomous people or creatures. Artificial life games are related to computer science research in artificial life. But "because they're intended for entertainment rather than research, commercial A-life games implement only a subset of what A-life research investigates." This broad genre includes god games which focus on managing tribal worshipers, as well as artificial pets that focus on one or several animals. It also includes genetic artificial life games, where players manage populations of creatures over several generations.

== History ==
Artificial life games and life simulations find their origins in artificial life research, including Conway's Game of Life from 1970. But one of the first commercially viable artificial life games was Little Computer People in 1985, a Commodore 64 game that allowed players to type requests to characters living in a virtual house. The game is cited as a little-known forerunner of virtual-life simulator games to follow. One of the earliest dating sims, Tenshitachi no gogo, was released for the 16-bit NEC PC-9801 computer that same year, though dating sim elements can be found in Sega's earlier Girl's Garden in 1984.

In the mid-1990s, virtual pets such as Petz and Tamagotchi began to appear. Around the same time, Creatures became "the first full-blown commercial entertainment application of Artificial Life and genetic algorithms". By 2000, The Sims refined the formula seen in Little Computer People and became the most successful artificial life game created to date.

In 2008, the game Spore was released, being a notable example of innovative gameplay in a life simulation game, borrowing elements from different game genres. Spore, in which the player develops an alien species of their own liking and control them through different life stages, featured different gameplay styles depending on said stage: from the microbial tide pool level (cell stage) that is depicted as a simple action game, until the final stage where they can build an interstellar empire (space stage), featuring loose elements from the strategy game genre.

In 2013, the first playable version of Thrive was released. The idea of Thrive is designed as a more “scientifically accurate" view on the idea of Spore, which uses a more "cute" and simplified approach. Similar to Spore, Thrive is divided into stages, of which only the first is finished, while the other 9 stages are currently in development.

== Types ==
=== Digital pets ===
Digital pets are a subgenre of artificial life game where players train, maintain, and watch a simulated animal. The pets can be simulations of real animals, or fantasy pets. Unlike genetic artificial life games that focus on larger populations of organisms, digital pet games usually allow players to interact with one or a few pets at once. In contrast to artificial life games, digital pets do not usually reproduce or die, although there are exceptions where pets will run away if ignored or mistreated.

Digital pets are usually designed to be cute, and act out a range of emotions and behaviors that tell the player how to influence the pet. "This quality of rich intelligence distinguishes artificial pets from other kinds of A-life, in which individuals have simple rules but the population as a whole develops emergent properties". Players are able to tease, groom, and teach the pet, and so they must be able to learn behaviors from the player. However, these behaviors are typically "preprogrammed and are not truly emergent".

Game designers try to sustain the player's attention by mixing common behaviors with more rare ones, so the player is motivated to keep playing until they see them. Otherwise, these games often lack a victory condition or challenge, and can be classified as software toys. Games such as Nintendogs have been implemented for the Nintendo DS, although there are also simple electronic games that have been implemented on a keychain, such as Tamagotchi. There are also numerous online pet-raising/virtual pet games, such as Neopets. Other pet life simulation games include online show dog raising games, and show horse raising games.

=== Biological simulations ===
Some artificial life games allow players to manage a population of creatures over several generations, and try to achieve goals for the population as a whole. These games have been called genetic artificial life games, or biological simulations. Players are able to crossbreed creatures, which have a set of genes or descriptors that define the creature's characteristics. Some games also introduce mutations due to random or environmental factors, which can benefit the population as creatures reproduce. These creatures typically have a short life-span, such as the Creatures series where organisms can survive from half an hour to well over seven hours. Players are able to watch forces of natural selection shape their population, but can also interact with the population by breeding certain individuals together, by modifying the environment, or by introducing new creatures from their design.

Another group of biological simulation games seek to simulate the life of an individual animal whose role the player assumes (rather than simulating an entire ecosystem controlled by the player). These include Wolf and its sequel Lion, the similar WolfQuest, and the more modest Odell educational series.

In addition, a large number of games have loose biological or evolutionary themes but do not attempt to reflect closely the reality of either biology or evolution: these include, within the "God game" variety, Evolution: The Game of Intelligent Life and Spore, and within the arcade/RPG variety, a multitude of entertainment software products including Eco and EVO: Search for Eden.

=== Social simulation ===
Social simulation games explore social interactions between multiple artificial lives. In some cases, the player may simply be an observer with no direct control but can influence the environment of the artificial lives, such as by creating and furnishing a house and creating situations for those characters to interact. These games are part of a subcategory of artificial life game sometimes called a virtual dollhouse. The Sims is the most notable example of this type of game, and was itself influenced by the 1985 game Little Computer People.

In other games, the player takes a more active role as one character living alongside other artificial ones, engaging in similar life pursuits as to make money or sustain their character while engaging in social interactions with the other characters, typically seeking to gain beneficial relations with all such characters. Several of these fall into the subgenre of farming simulations, where the player-character runs a farm in a rural setting, growing crops and raising livestock to make money to keep their farm going while working to improve relations with the local townspeople. Such games include the Story of Seasons and the Animal Crossing series, and Stardew Valley. Dating sims are related to this type of game, but generally where the play-character is seeking a romantic relationship with one or more computer-controlled characters, with such titles often aimed at more mature audiences compared to the typical social simulation game. Dating sims may be more driven by visual novel gameplay elements than typical simulation gameplay.

=== Raising simulation ===
Raising simulation games are a subgenre of life simulation games that focus on nurturing and developing a character over time, rather than defeating enemies or waging battles. They are explicitly distinguished from RPGs and other simulations by stressing the lesser importance of combat and the focus on repeated training, care, and life-management decisions as the player guides growth.

Academic accounts traced the genre's conceptual roots to Conway's Game of Life (1970) as a model of autonomous development, while identifying 1980s commercial titles as practical forerunners: Little Computer People (1985), Puppy Love (1986) and Best Play Pro Yakyuu (1988). These games emphasized daily upkeep and long-term progression, but were not yet grouped under a single genre label at the time.

The success of Princess Maker gave rise to the term "raising games", a genre that sees players take on the role of a guardian or mentor to guide a character's growth. In Princess Maker, this concept is realized through the father-daughter relationship, where the player is tasked with raising a young girl, nurturing her skills, and shaping her future.

The genre deviated from traditional action-oriented games and embraced a nurturing experience, where the gameplay revolves around passive decision-making rather than active participation. This "passive protagonist" approach became a defining characteristic of the genre. Despite these shifts in perspective, the game's fundamental concept of character development, fostered through a series of choices and events, laid the foundation for the success of the raising simulation genre.

By 1993, media features and industry surveys began treating raising simulations as an independent genre, often framed as "beautiful-girl raising simulations", and formalized their defining trait as games devoted purely to growth and care.

Most raising simulations are single-player and emphasise planning and resource management. Some titles incorporate visual novel elements to support branching events and character interactions. While historically more common in Japan, raising simulations have begun to attract growing interest in Western markets.

Gameplay centres around making choices and building character stats in order to reach specific goals or achievements. These games are usually turn-based, with time sometimes divided into days or seasons that require actions to be taken in that turn.

Notable examples of raising simulations include Monster Rancher, The Idolmaster, and Umamusume: Pretty Derby.

== Examples ==
=== Biological simulations ===
- Creatura – virtual evolution vivarium, with focus on scientifically accurate genetics and enclosed ecosystem simulation, made by Koksny
- Creatures series, by Creature Labs/Gameware Development
- Lion – the sequel to Wolf; simulates the life of a lion
- Odell Lake and Odell Down Under, simple educational games about aquatic life and food chains
- Rain World – simulates a post-civilization, post-industrial ecosystem
- Saurian – simulates the life of non-avian dinosaurs in the Hell Creek formation
- Science Horizons Survival – an early game which also teaches about food chains.
- Shelter and Shelter 2– simulates the life of a badger and lynx family across the respective games, made by Might and Delight
- SimAnt – a Maxis game that allows the player to assume control of an ant colony
- SimEarth – another Maxis game that deals with terraforming and guiding a planet through its geological and biological development.
- SimLife – another Maxis game which experiments with genetics and ecosystems.
- SimPark
- Star Wars Episode I: The Gungan Frontier simulates a planet which the player populates with creatures that compete for limited supplies of food.
- Thrive – an open source spiritual successor to Spore, focusing on a more accurate biological simulation developed by Revolutionary Games Studios.
- Wolf – simulates the life of a wolf, made by Sanctuary Woods.
- WolfQuest

==== Loosely biology- and evolution-inspired games ====
Some games take biology or evolution as a theme, rather than attempting to simulate.

- Ancestors: The Humankind Odyssey (2019, Panache Digital Games) – a survival game, in which the player guides a clan of primates in their open – but hostile – environment, while overseeing their evolutionary course.
- Creatures (artificial life program) (1998–2002, Creature Labs) – an early 'artificial-life' program, the Creatures franchise features creatures called 'Norns', each of which has its own 'digital DNA' that later generations can inherit. The Norns are semi-autonomous, but must be trained to interact with their environment to avoid starvation.
- Cubivore: Survival of the Fittest (2002, Nintendo) – an action adventure.
- Eco (1988, Ocean)
- E.V.O.: Search for Eden (1992, Enix) – an arcade game which portrays an evolving organism across different stages. "Evolutionary points" are earned by eating other creatures and are used to evolve.
- flOw (2006, Jenova Chen) – a Flash game similar to E.V.O.
- L.O.L.: Lack of Love (2000, ASCII Entertainment) – a role-playing game; the player assumes the role of a creature which gradually changes its body and improves its abilities, but this is done by means of more varied achievements, often involving social interactions with other creatures.
- Seaman (2000, Vivarium) – a virtual pet video game for the Sega Dreamcast.
- Seventh Cross Evolution (1999, UFO Interactive Games) – an action game.
- Spore (2008, Electronic Arts) – a multi-genre God game. The first and second stages are biology-themed, although the second stage also has more role-playing game elements.

=== Social and raising simulations ===
- Alter Ego – a personality computer game released by Activision in 1986
- Animal Crossing – a life simulator series by Nintendo. It has also been dubbed as a "communication game" by the company as had Cubivore, Doshin the Giant and GiFTPiA.
- Castaway Paradise
- Eccky – by Media Republic.
- Façade – An artificial-intelligence-based interactive story
- Floigan Bros. - An action-adventure game involving life-simulation elements with the game's AI driven NPC, Moigle.
- The Story of Seasons series – by Marvelous Entertainment, farming simulator, role-playing game, and dating sim rolled into one.
- The Idolmaster – an idol raising sim game series by Namco (now Bandai Namco Entertainment), which become a idol multimedia franchise.
- Jones in the Fast Lane – by Sierra Entertainment is one of the earliest life simulators.
- Kudos series – by Positech Games.
- Little Computer People – by David Crane, published by Activision in (1985)
- My Life My Love: Boku no Yume: Watashi no Negai – a life simulation for the Japanese Famicom system
- The Princess Maker series – by Gainax, a raising sim which the player have to raise an adoptive daughter until she reaches adulthood. The final result varies from a ruling queen to an ordinary housewife, or even a prostitute if the player looks after her poorly
- Real Lives – an educational life simulator by Educational Simulations where the player is randomly "born" somewhere in the world and often must deal with third-world difficulties such as disease, malnutrition, and civil war.
- Roots of Pacha – life simulator in prehistoric setting in development by Soda Den.
- Tenshitachi no gogo – One of the earliest dating sims, released for the 16-bit NEC PC-9801 computer that same year.
- The Sims – by Will Wright, published by EA for the PC (2000), and sequels, The Sims 2 (2004), The Sims 3 (2009) and The Sims 4 (2014).
- Tomodachi Life – by Nintendo
- True Love – (1995), a Japanese erotic dating sim and general life simulation game where the player must manage the player's daily activities, such as studying, exercise, and employment.
- The Virtual Villagers series – by Last Day of Work.
- Moon RPG Remix Adventure – a social RPG released only in Japan, created by the same designer as Lack of Love and GiFTPiA
- New York Nights: Success in the City – a social simulation created and designed by Gameloft released for mobile phones.
- Second Life – a multi-user virtual community without a specific objective or traditional gaming mechanisms, created and designed by Linden Lab in 2003.
- Shenmue – an open world video game series that simulates life in Japan and China in the 1980s.
- Wall Street Kid – a life simulation about balancing love with high finance
- Paralives – an upcoming indie life simulation game for PC and Mac
- InZOI – an upcoming life simulation game, developed by Krafton. It is still in early access state.
