= Shien's Revenge =

1994 video game

- Developer: Almanic Corporation
- Publishers: JP: Dynamic Planning; NA: Vic Tokai
- Designers: Go Nagai; Takashi Shichijo
- Programmers: Hiromitsu Shioya; Toshiyuki Mori
- Artists: Hidetoshi Fujioka; Ken Ishikawa; Nanako Geya
- Writer: Tatsuhiko Dan
- Composers: Akihiko Mori; Michiya Hirasawa; Tsukushi Sasaki
- Platform: Super Nintendo Entertainment System
- Release: JP: 8 April 1994; NA: October 1994
- Genre: Rail shooter
- Mode: Single-player

Shien's Revenge (Note: Also known as Shien: The Blade Chaser (Japanese: 紫炎 ～ザ・ブレイドチェイサー～, Hepburn: Shien: Za Bureido Cheisā) in Japan.) is a 1994 rail shooter video game developed by Almanic Corporation and originally published by Dynamic Planning for the Super Nintendo Entertainment System in Japan and later in North America by Vic Tokai. In the game, players assume the role of the titular ninja to fight against monsters coming from a time portal in order to face against an entity known as Undertaker and rescue his companion Aska. Co-designed by Takashi Shichijo and mangaka Go Nagai, the title was created by most of the same team that worked on previous projects at Almanic such as E.V.O.: Search for Eden. It was met with mixed reception from critics since its release.

== Gameplay ==
Gameplay screenshot

Shien's Revenge is a rail shooter game played from a first-person where movement is automatically controlled horizontally or vertically, as players assume the role of the titular ninja through six stages, each with a boss at the end stage that must be fought before progressing any further, in an effort to defeat an evil entity known as Undertaker and rescue his companion Aska as the main objective. Prior to the main game, players can practice their skills by choosing "training mode" at the title screen. During gameplay, use long-range shurikens or a close-range kunai as weapons to fight various enemies or block incoming attacks that appear on the playfield. Players can also pick up power-ups like rapid fire and magic scrolls when enemies are defeated; the use of scrolls produces a powerful attack that damages everything onscreen. A set of candles represents Shien's life meter and the game is over once it is depleted, though players have the option to continue playing a limited number of times. The SNES Mouse can be used as an optional controller and players can resume progress via a password system.

== Synopsis ==
Shien and Aska are a pair of highly skilled ninjas fighting in a bloody civil war. After killing hundreds of enemies and emerging victorious, monsters suddenly appeared from a time portal and kidnap Aska. The mastermind is a mysterious force only known as the Undertaker. Shien, now alone, must travel through the time portal to defeat the unknown evil entity and rescue his companion Aska, while facing monsters on his way that emerge from portal.

== Development and release ==
Shien's Revenge was developed, with additional support from Bee Media and Shuna, by most of the same team that worked on previous projects at Almanic Corporation such as E.V.O.: Search for Eden, with both Takashi Shichijo and mangaka Go Nagai acting as co-designers, serving as the debut of Nagai in the video game industry creating bosses. Hiromitsu Shioya and Toshiyuki Mori served as programmers, while Hidetoshi Fujioka, Ken Ishikawa and Nanako Geya acted as artists. The plot was written by Tatsuhiko Dan, with composers Akihiko Mori, Michiya Hirasawa and Tsukushi "Tukushi" Sasaki scoring the soundtrack. Other members also collaborated in its making. The game was first released by Dynamic Planning in Japan on April 8, 1994 and later in North America by Vic Tokai on October.

== Reception ==
Reception

Aggregate score
Aggregator	Score
GameRankings	59%

Review scores
Publication	Score
AllGame	2.5/5
GamePro	13.5/20
Nintendo Power	2.95/5
Consoles +	84%
Game Players	74%
Joypad	55%
Video Games	47%

Shien's Revenge was rated the score of 74% by Game Players. According to Electronic Gaming Monthly, the game has "a great concept and the mouse interface is totally cool", but it "can get repetitive after few levels of the same action". GamePro remarked that the gameplay concept is unique, but suffers from poor design and difficult controls, even when using the SNES mouse.
