= 1 in 8 Billion =

- Landing page of the game
- Developer: Jin's Earth (also known as Jin Hwi-eus)
- Designer: Jin's Earth
- Platform: Web browser
- Release: 5 October 2026
- Genres: Life simulation, Interactive fiction
- Mode: Single-player

1 in 8 Billion (Korean: 80억 분의 1) is a text-based life simulation game developed by an independent video game developer, Jin's Earth, using Claude Opus and released on 5 October 2026.

The game allows players to experience a life of randomly generated characters in the world of 8 billion based on statistical data from the United Nations, the World Health Organization, and the World Bank. While players cannot choose where the characters are born, they can choose when they are born. The player can also pick where to focus and make decisions affect health, happiness, knowledge, and relationships throughout their life. Additionally, players can compare other characters born in the same year. The game is free to play without advertisements or pay to win features, while they could pay to have a keepsake pass including the character's digital works, such as films, albums, record books, and memorials.

The game went viral among netizens from East Asia after its release. Industry professionals such as Yuji Horii, Takafumi Horie have played and praised the game.

== Gameplay ==
Screenshot of the game featuring a boy who was born in March 2026 as one of the poorest families in rural Mindanao, the Philippines

1 in 8 Billion is a browser game. Players can play on the website without signing up, creating accounts, or installing. While players cannot choose where the characters are born, they can choose when the characters are born (from 1950 onward, based on projections) and how the birthing place is determined, either as a newborn or as people already alive.

General length of a character's life ranges from 30 minutes, 1 hour, and 1.5 hours. One in-game turn represents real-life year. Players can pause, speed up, and enables auto mode during gameplay. The maximum speed is 16x, where one year passes in three seconds, and a life generally ended in 15 minutes. The game can conclude in less than a minute if players encountered infant mortality.

Once the game starts by clicking the "Be born" button, a fully profiled character is generated, including their country, gender, skin colour, family, and physical condition, will be generated. The birthplace is determined by statistical data. The most likely countries for birth are India (17.6%), China (6.7%), Nigeria (5.7%), Pakistan (5.2%), and Indonesia (3.4%), while Taiwan accounts for less than 0.1%. When a character born, the game generates four characters born in the same time for comparison. Each has different backgrounds and thus a different fate. For example, while one character forming a family, the other characters may died for malaria long ago. The game also pauses at key ages, such as 5, 15, 30, 50, or 70, to ask players how they feel when comparing their character to others, providing context such as infant mortality rates or income rankings.

Players can pick a focus in the life at any time. Decision from players directly affects the character's four status: health, happiness. knowledge, and relationships. Players choices, however, are usually constrained by the character's environment. For example, girls from poor families in developing countries often drop out of school due to financial condition from families. In developing countries, most jobs are basic industries such as agriculture or manufacturing, while sports and tech industries are available more common in developed countries. Once the character earns income, the "spend & invest" option becomes available, allowing players to obtain certifications, plan trips, and invest to mitigate economic decline.

The game concludes when the character dies, without any scoring, ranking, or evaluating of their life. Save data cannot be loaded as well. The final screen revisits key moments from the character's life in a slideshow-like format. A life record is generated, detailing the character's education, career, family, and a life map where each pixel represents each year's happiness. Players can leave their messages to the character, while other compared characters fates were displayed side by side.

1 in 8 Billion is free to play without any advertisements or pay-to-win mechanics. To focus on developing the game, the developer also refuses colorations from companies. Paying money never changes how a life goes. The only paid feature is the "keepsake pass" priced at $3. It includes digital works about the character, such as films, albums, record books, and memorials. The memorials allow others to visit, light a candle, and leave a message.

=== Events ===
During gameplay, the game presents one to three events for players to choose. These cover aspects of human life, including education paths, career choices, pets, partners, marriage, property purchases, immigration, medical decision, and retirement. Each characters' events and their fate are based on statistical data. Negative events, displayed in red, includes school bullying, death of relatives, drug abuse, sexual assault, infectious disease, accidents, and even wars. 1 in 8 Billion is recommended for players aged 15 and up due to its heavy subjects including death, illness, war, and domestic violence.

Initially, the suicide ending was excluded while other heavy subjects like infant mortality, child marriage, and armed conflict, were included. According to Jin's Earth, it was intended because they did not wanted to make suicide appear like an ineluctable fate to players who were struggle with difficult time. Players, however, questioned the excluding since it is one of major leading causes of death. The suicide ending was later included in v0.6.36 beta released on 11 October 2026. Rather than included in the player's choice, it is treaded like other causes of death based on statistics. Certain events could rise the risk such as loneliness, losing relatives, unemployment, and debt, while certain choices of talking to others and counseling could reduce the risk. Message of suicide prevention would appeared when the character was died from suicide. The developer explained that omitting the ending would excluding people ended with suicide in real life.

== Development ==
1 in 8 Billion is developed by Jin's Earth, a Korean independent video game developer who described themselves as digital nomad. During their travels, Jin's Earth saw different lifestyles around the world, and began considering the meaning of a person in a world of 8 billion people. On 5 October 2026 (Japan Standard Time), they started developing the game with Claude Opus 5.5 in four hours.

The data for 1 in 8 Billion is from the United Nations, the World Health Organization, the World Bank, and the Global Burden of Disease study. Data includes births, life expectancy, infant mortality, income distribution, years of schooling, child marriage rate, and life tables by sex. If complete data is lacking, estimates are made by referring to regional averages. The developer also expressed their limitations when developing the life in developing countries: Statistical data is often lacking in regions where life is harder, while numbers can never capture a person's daily life. To avoid depicating life in developing countries as poverty and suffering, the developer features some heartwarming moments such as tasting delicious local food prepared by parents, Diwali, Ramadan and Christmas.

The developer expressed their surprise upon receiving feedback, commenting that players experience the in-game life as if it were their own, and took examples of fixing a car owner involved in a motorbike accident, and a child taking out a loan to help their family. The developer also included workplace sexual harassment and Hikikomori experiences reported by Japanese players, and removed events that would not occur in the character's country based on feedback from players in that country.

== Release ==
Initially, Jin's Earth did not intend to publish 1 in 8 Billion , but later changed their mind when many netizens requested a test link. They quickly secured the domain, developed the game in four hours, and published the game on the same day. According to an interview with the developer on 9 October, approximately 58% of lives had completed. The game was released in beta on 5 October 2026 with three languages (Korean, English, and Japanese), available in 141 countries. In an update on 15 October, available countries expanded to 172, as well as supporting Chinese and Vietnamese.

The game went viral across East Asia upon it release. It firstly spread across X and KakaoTalk, and visitor traffic on 7 October was seven times higher than on 6 October. It later went viral in Japan after a report from Automaton. The game has also became a trend in Taiwan and Hong Kong when Chinese is supported.

== Reception ==
1 in 8 Billion received a wide acclaim from various industry professionals. Notable people who has played include Yuji Horii, the creator of Dragon Quest, Takafumi Horie, the founder of Livedoor, Yohei Sadoshima, a Japanese editor, and Takayuki Fukatsu, a chief experience officer of note inc.. While Horie praised the game as "amazing", Sadoshima commented that the game proved that games can take roles that traditional literature once fulfilled.

Shin Osada, editor-in-chief of Markets Insider, compares the game to other life simulators developed by other financial institutions, which he described as lacking in entertainment value. He praised the game for providing useful insights over investments. Naoto Morooka of Automaton said the game encourages players to reflect on the realities of their lives and families.

Jin's Earth, the game's developer, identified reasons for the game's viral success, such as "data personalisation" transforming big data into a character's life story, social sharing, perspective shift, and the low barrier to play on a browser. He described the game's core philosophy was to ensure the work did not become a form of entertainment for selecting an ideal life, but rather the sense of gratitude players felt after experiencing random encounters would be further transformed into an understanding of and respect for all life forms living in diverse environments across the globe.

== See also ==
- Real Lives (video game)
- Sustainable Development Goals
