= River City Girls Zero =

1994 video game

Shin Nekketsu Kōha Kunio-tachi no Banka
- Japanese SFC cover art
- Developers: Almanic Corporation; River City Girls Zero; WayForward
- Publisher: JP: Technōs Japan; River City Girls Zero; Arc System Works
- Designer: Yoshihisa Kishimoto
- Composers: Kazunaka Yamane; River City Girls Zero; Megan McDuffee
- Series: Kunio-kun
- Platforms: Super Famicom; Nintendo Switch; PlayStation 4; PlayStation 5; Windows; Xbox One; Xbox Series X/S
- Release: Super Famicom: JP: April 29, 1994; WW: September 21, 2022; River City Girls Zero; Nintendo Switch: WW: February 14, 2022; PS4, PS5, Windows, Xbox One, Series X/S: WW: September 21, 2022
- Genre: Beat 'em up
- Modes: Single-player, multiplayer

Shin Nekketsu Kōha: Kunio-tachi no Banka (Note: Japanese: 新・熱血硬派 くにおたちの挽歌; lit. "The New Hot-Blooded Tough Guy: The Eulogy of Kunio and Co.") is a beat 'em up video game developed by Almanic Corporation and published by Technos Japan for the Super Famicom in 1994 exclusively in Japan. It was the fourth game in the Kunio-kun series released for the Super Famicom.

WayForward and Arc System Works developed an English-localized version under the title of River City Girls Zero, which was released in 2022; for Nintendo Switch on February 14 and for PlayStation, Windows, and Xbox platforms on September 21.

== Gameplay ==
Compared with most of the other games in the "River City" series, Kunio-tachi no Banka features a dramatic and serious storyline, with comparatively realistically proportioned character designs (in contrast to the usual "super deformed" style) and an emphasis on dialogue between battles. While there are no "stages" in the traditional sense, the game's structure is completely linear and players cannot backtrack into previously-completed areas.

During the bike stages, Player 1 rides the bike, while Player 2 sits on the back-seat.

Up to two players can play simultaneously. In lieu of extra lives, the game utilizes a party system in which the player can switch between different characters at any point. While Kunio and Riki are the only characters available at first, their respective girlfriends Misako (who first appeared in Nekketsu High School Dodgeball Club: Soccer Story) and Kyoko also become playable as well throughout the course of the game. Each character has his or her own health gauge, but the game will end if the player's current character is defeated, regardless of how much health the others still have left. During a two-player game, if one player is defeated, then he will remain inactive (along with the last character he was using) until the other player either, completes the current scene, or is defeated by the enemy. Continues are unlimited and a passcode feature is available, allowing the player to restart the game at almost any scene. There are two difficulty settings as well, Normal and Easy, but the player can only proceed up to a certain point on Easy before being asked to restart the game on Normal.

Conversations between characters occur between battles.

The fighting system is similar to the original Nekketsu Kōha Kunio-kun (Renegade) or the Double Dragon series. All characters can punch, kick, jump, block, and attack behind them. Initially, Kunio and Riki can only perform basic moves while wearing their prison clothes. When they switch to their school uniforms, Kunio and Riki get access to more elaborate techniques such as grappling moves and individual special attacks. The fighting styles of the female characters also differ from their male counterparts (Misako and Kyoko cannot perform grab attacks for example, nor can they be grabbed by enemies).

== Plot ==
Kunio and Riki are convicted of a hit and run and the pair are imprisoned in a juvenile correction facility, but the two claim to be innocent. The next morning, the duo are visited by Kunio's friend Hiroshi, who informs them of a series of suspicious events transpiring in and around Nekketsu High School, including sightings of a boy with a strong resemblance to Kunio. Suspecting that they may have been framed for a crime they didn't commit, Kunio and Riki escape from prison and set out to find the person who framed them and clear their names, aided by their girlfriends Misako and Kyoko.

== Development and release ==
Unlike the other Kunio-kun games released for the Super Famicom, Kunio-tachi no Banka was developed by Almanic rather than internally by Technos Japan Corp, although most of the main staff members were former employees of the company. The game was produced by Noriyuki Tomiyama (who worked on the arcade versions of Super Dodge Ball and The Combatribes) and directed by Yoshihisa Kishimoto (creator of Kunio-kun and Double Dragon), while the late Michiya Hirasawa (sound programmer in numerous Technos titles) was the lead programmer and made sound effects. Kazunaka Yamane (who worked on the original Double Dragon and Combatribes) composed the music. The game's scenario and screenplay was written by Hiro Yokokura. The game's title Kunio-tachi no Banka, roughly translated as "The Elegy of Kunio", is meant as a reference to John Woo's A Better Tomorrow which released in Japan (along with films A Better Tomorrow II, The Killer and Hard Boiled) under the title Otokotachi no Banka (The Elegy of Men when translated to english).

Kyōko, Riki, Kunio, and Misako

The game's engine and assets would be reused for Super Mad Champ, which was originally planned to be a Kunio-kun bike racing game but was revamped into an original game. Kishimoto wrote a draft for a Kunio-tachi no Banka sequel titled Nekketsu Kōha Kunio-kun: Kowloon no Tsume (熱血硬派くにおくん ～九龍の爪～, The Claw of Kowloon), which was planned for the PlayStation, but was never actually developed.

The scene where Kunio and Riki fall down to a river along with a collapsing bridge, and find a hideout behind a waterfall, was based on an unused bit of level design from Return of Double Dragon.

The game would be the final action game in the Kunio-kun series developed by Technos Japan.

The game was released for the Super Famicom in Japan on April 29, 1994. In 2015, the company City Connection released the soundtrack to the game via digital distribution.

== Reception and legacy ==
Reception

Review scores
| Publication | Score |
|---|---|
| Famitsu | 8/10, 6/10, 5/10, 5/10 |
| Nintendo Life | 8/10 |
| Joypad | 65% |
| PlayStation Magazine (JP) | 21.8/30 |
| Super Console | 85/100 |

Upon release, four reviewers in Famicom Tsūshin commented on the game. Two felt the dark story line was offputting as the characters have become popular with such a young audience. Hirokazu Hamamura wrote that newer fans may be put off, but recommended it for fans of Kunio. The fourth reviewer found the game's controls a bit clunky, but said the atmosphere of the game was enveloping.

Kunio-tachi no Banka served as inspiration for River City Girls, a spin-off title developed and released by WayForward in September 2019. It stars Kyoko and Misako as the protagonists, and the game's lead composer Megan McDuffee arranged some of the tracks from this game. Kunio-tachi no Banka was later re-released in 2022 under the English-localized title River City Girls Zero, using Limited Run's Carbon Engine, and features dual audio for the new introductory cutscene featuring Kyoko and Misako. The re-release includes two translations; one based more closely on the original script, and one that incorporates elements from River City Girls.
