= Kōtetsu no Kishi =

1991 video game

- NEC PC-9801 cover art
- Developers: General Support (NEC PC-9801); Dual (Super Famicom)
- Publishers: General Support (NEC PC-9801); Asmik Ace Entertainment (Super Famicom)
- Designer: Takashi Abe
- Composer: Akihiko Mori
- Platforms: NEC PC-9801, Super Famicom
- Release: NEC PC-9801: JP: January 25, 1991; Super Famicom: JP: February 19, 1993
- Genre: Strategy
- Mode: Single-player

Kōtetsu no Kishi (鋼鉄の騎士; lit. "Steel Knight") is a Japan-exclusive video game created by General Support which was originally released for the NEC PC-9801, and later ported for the Super Famicom.

The Super Famicom version of the game received the sequels named Kōtetsu no Kishi 2: Sabaku no Rommel Shōgun and Kōtetsu no Kishi 3: Gekitotsu Europe Sensen. There was an expansion pack for the original NEC PC-9801 version titled Tetsujūji Shō - Kōtetsu no Kishi Scenario (鉄十字章 ＜鋼鉄の騎士シナリオ＞), which added a new scenario.

== Summary ==
The player has to prepare his troops for battle. He does so by researching the map and then assigning the soldiers to their appropriate platoons.

The player controls German Waffen-SS and Heer officer who was responsible for commanding troops in major World War II operations like Operation Barbarossa (which are included in the game). Before each mission, a basic summary is given in Japanese in addition to unit strengths, and the locations of major cities.

Players must assign starting locations for all of their units and must seek out the AI opponent, which has placed its units according to their historical starting locations. Each mission has the player either invade the enemy, withdraw from an untenable position, or defend occupied territory. The rate of accuracy in combat is entirely dependent on the distance between the opponents along with a degree of luck (to determine whether the bullet penetrates the target for a hit or not). The concept of endurance is completely absent for all units in this game.

Cover art (Super Famicom)

Players have access to in-mission help and the option menu. Attack, defense, and speed statistics are covered for each unit. Like in real history, the game ends after the player is scripted to lose the Battle of Moscow, which saw nearly 1.6 million casualties on both sides of the battle. The player is given a brief message by a man in a motorcycle, then a game over screen appears. The timespan of the Super Famicom version of the game is from June 1941 to September 1943, approximately the duration of Nazi Germany's forward offensive moment in the Eastern Front of World War II, but the NEC PC-9801 version of the game extends the timespan to March 1945, when the player has to defend the Third Reich from the invading Anglo-American forces.

== See also ==
- SNES Mouse
- List of World War II video games
- Barbarossa - a closely related video game, also for the Super Famicom
