= Kōtetsu no Kishi 2: Sabaku no Rommel Shōgun =

1994 video game

- Super Famicom cover art
- Developers: General Support (Windows); Dual (Super Famicom)
- Publishers: General Support (Microsoft Windows); Asmik Ace Entertainment (Super Famicom)
- Designer: Takashi Abe
- Composer: Akihiko Mori
- Platforms: Super Famicom, Microsoft Windows
- Release: Super Famicom: JP: January 28, 1994; Microsoft Windows: JP: July 12, 2002
- Genre: Strategy
- Mode: Single-player

Kōtetsu no Kishi 2: Sabaku no Rommel Shōgun (鋼鉄の騎士2 砂漠のロンメル軍団; lit. "Rommel's Desert Army of Steel Knights 2") is a Japan-exclusive video game that was released for the Super Famicom in 1994, and to the Windows operating system in 2002.

The Super Famicom version of this video game is a sequel to Kōtetsu no Kishi and is followed by Kōtetsu no Kishi 3: Gekitotsu Europe Sensen.

== Gameplay ==
Burning down the Allied HQ in Cairo results in the Axis powers winning the campaign and the North African theatre.

Players can either compete in a military campaign, a practice mode, or even construct their own ideal battlefield. Taking place mostly in the North African theatre of World War II, Mode 7 graphics help to provide a transition from battlefield to battlefield. While participating in the military campaign, the player gets promoted from lieutenant to captain and ends the campaign as a captain.

The campaign mode in this game takes place in a time period spanning from April 1941 (when the German Panzer tanks arrive in North Africa) to July 1945 (that assumes that the Battle of Berlin has been delayed by the player's action in the North African Campaign). Once in the battlefield, the pieces are viewed from a top-down perspective, with an option tab that allows for variations like difficulty level and the presence of video game background music to be altered. Each unit has a variety of offense, defense, hit rate, and agility ratings that reflect its historical successes and/or shortcomings on the battlefield. Being successful in destroying units allows the commander of each unit to earn a series of German Crosses (in both gold and silver). Killing approximately 28 units results in that particular unit being promoted to the rank of warrant officer.

The primary objective in the campaign mode is to help Field Marshal Erwin Rommel capture the headquarters for the Allied forces in Cairo while preventing the Axis forces' headquarters from suffering the same fate. After the end of the game, the screen shows how many people were killed and how many people survived on the player's side. A survival rate is also shown in percentage in order to track the number of people that remained alive after the end of the campaign. While the Allied forces in this game are mostly Anglo-American, there are also troops from other Allied countries like France and the Soviet Union. Troops from Nazi-friendly nations like Fascist Italy and the Empire of Japan show up on some missions in the Windows version as auxiliary support for the main German troops.

Erwin Rommel in Kōtetsu no Kishi 2.

== See also ==
- SNES Mouse
- List of World War II video games
