= Super Mad Champ =

1995 video game

- Developer(s): Givro Corporation
- Publisher(s): Tsukuda Original
- Director(s): Nanako Geya
- Producer(s): Noriyuki Tomiyama; Yukio Tomita
- Designer(s): Kishi
- Programmer(s): Hiroko Yamabiko
- Artist(s): Nao Yuki; Toshiaki Fujioka; Yasuo Wakatsuki
- Composer(s): Hikoshi Hashimoto
- Platform(s): Super Famicom
- Release: JP: 4 March 1995
- Genre(s): Racing, vehicular combat
- Mode(s): Single-player

Super Mad Champ (Note: Japanese: スーパーマッドチャンプ, Hepburn: Sūpā Maddo Chanpu) is a racing and vehicular combat video game developed by Givro Corporation and published by Tsukuda Original in Japan exclusively for the Super Famicom on 4 March 1995. The game is centered around a series of motorcycle races throughout various locations that the player must win to advance to higher-difficulty races, while using attacks to hinder the other racers.

== Gameplay ==
Gameplay screenshot

Super Mad Champ has a similar gameplay to Road Rash. The game puts the player in control of a motorcycle racer who must finish in third place or higher among five other racers through three grand prix: GP2, GP1 and Super, with each race taking place in a number of locations. There are also a time attack option, a password feature and an option screen to configure various settings such as controls and sound.

At the start of the game, it starts with zero dollars, which can be earned by attacking the opponents, doing advanced moves (e.g. wheelie) or completing the race.

During a race, racers can brake, accelerate, and attack neighboring opponents. The racer can perform wheelie, but if they land while doing the trick, it will lose the momentum. The racer can be ejected from their bike if they crash into an obstacle (such as tires) or if they run out of stamina due to fights with opponents. Both the racer and the opponents have a damage bar for both the person and the bike. The racer can dismount and get in the bike which can be useful if the player's bike has been destroyed. While on-foot, the racer can perform a few basic moves such as blocking, punching, jump kicking, grab rolling and picking up the bike and throwing them. Vehicle speeds for unmodified "stock" motorcycles can easily reach the 150 kilometres per hour (93 mph) range.

At the end of the race, the player can spend money to buy new bikes, repair the currently owned ones and entrances.

== Development and release ==
Super Mad Champ was created by most of the same team that worked on previous projects such as Shin Nekketsu Kōha: Kunio-tachi no Banka, with Nanako Geya acting as the project's director. Artists "Duke" Ishikawa, "Ryukun King!!" and Nao Yuki were responsible for character designs, while Toshiaki Fujioka and Yasuo Wakatsuki created the pixel art. Hiroko Yamabiko, "Shiochi" and "Sorimachin" served as programmers, while composer Hikoshi Hashimoto scored the soundtrack and created the sound effects. A member under the pseudonym of "Kishi" collaborated as the game's sole designer. Producers Noriyuki Tomiyama, Takeshi Wakui and Yukio Tomita oversaw its development process. Other members also collaborated in its making.

Super Mad Champ was released only in Japan by Tsukada Original on 4 March 1995. Prior to launch, it was originally intended to be published by Technōs Japan and had the working title of Mad Champ 2088. (Note: マッドチャンプ2088 (Maddo Chanpu 2088))
