= Eccky =

Social simulation game

Eccky was an online game. Until 2009, it was an MSN-based social simulation game in which two people work together to create and raise a virtual baby. Eccky won the 2005 SpinAwards for Innovation and for Best Interactive Concept. In 2009, the game play changed to a real-time virtual world on Hyves. As of 2024, the game is no longer available.

== History ==
Eccky was created in August 2005 by Dutch developer Media Republic in association with MSN in the Netherlands. Eccky has characteristics of life simulation and virtual pet games. The gameplay of the first version of Eccky involved a virtual baby, or Eccky, which was born on the basis of information derived from both Eccky user players. Eccky used an AIML chatbot and MSN Messenger for chat between users and the Eccky baby. In 2006, Eccky became an independent company as a subsidiary of Media Republic.

From its live introduction to the public until August 2006, Eccky required an initial fee which could be paid by either user player. However Eccky has been free to play since September 2006.

== Eccky 1.0 (2005-2007) ==
In the first version of Eccky, two users create a virtual baby, and raise him/her with the goal of making the child as happy and satisfied as possible. A user fills out a questionnaire with information regarding their personal characteristics, child-rearing attitudes, favorites, etc. Once registration and the "DNA" test have been completed, a user may invite another person to make an Eccky. Upon accepting the invitation, the second user also registers on the Eccky website, and completes his/her own "DNA" test. Both players then choose both a masculine and feminine name for their future Eccky. Thereafter Eccky is born, with characteristics determined by the combination of both users' DNA profiles. Eccky's sex is randomly determined, as is Eccky's name (which is chosen randomly between the four possible names chosen by the user parents).

Over a six-day period from Eccky's birth, Eccky grows and ages three years for every one day of gameplay. Thus, in six days, Eccky develops from a cooing baby into an eighteen-year-old young adult with its own character. Every Eccky is unique at birth, and the way in which the users raise their Eccky further individualizes Eccky's demeanor and characteristics. On the sixth day, or upon turning 18, Eccky leaves the house to venture off into the wide world, and the game ends.

Eccky played principally via the Eccky website and MSN Messenger, though also via mobile phone. Upon Eccky's birth, Eccky is automatically added as a contact to the MSN contact lists of both players. This allows users to talk to their virtual child. Running on an AIML chat engine, Eccky is able to speak from the moment following birth, both in response to users addressing Eccky and by initiating conversations him/herself. Eccky initiates conversation either randomly or to express any particularly pressing need he/she may have (i.e. being extremely hungry, having to go to the bathroom, being very sick, feeling neglected, etc.) Eccky's vocabulary is initially limited to newborn babble. Then, as with a real child, Eccky's command of vocabulary grows with each day of gameplay, to a final capability of being able to respond with over 60,000 unique answers on more than 4,000 diverse subjects. Since June 2007, Eccky also features an in-game chat functionality.

Eccky and users can also exchange text messages via mobile phone. Exchange of text messages requires that the user have a mobile phone, and that the user purchase a mobile phone for Eccky within the game environment. This feature involves extra costs to the user, specifically the cost of sending text messages, and can be turned on and off at the user's discretion.

Most games are intended to be played with users playing against their Eccky and vice versa. Others are played in cooperation with Eccky. Of note are the racing games, some of which allow users to create their own tracks and race on them with Eccky. Though most games are free to play, some games require additional credits to play.

Eccky's physical and emotional states are subject to continual change, determined by 180 dynamic variables, and are influenced by the interaction with and treatment by users, both via the virtual world and via the chat. The levels of these physical and emotional states are continually assessed and are made visible to users via meters that gauge happiness, hunger, toilet needs, popularity, who Eccky's favorite parent is, etc. For example, if Eccky is not sufficiently fed, users will see this in Eccky's hunger meter. In worst-case scenarios, an Eccky can be neglected, physical and emotionally, to the point of needing to be sent to the hospital. During this time, gameplay continues and users may chat with Eccky, but may not interact with Eccky in the virtual world. Further, Eccky's physical and emotional states are reflected in the chat element, as Eccky will either comment, unsolicited, on how he/she is doing physically and emotionally, or respond to a user in such a way as to make his/her physical and emotional state known.

It is also possible to send Eccky away for a period, either to live in other accommodations such as in a hotel, on vacation, or to stay with a babysitter. A babysitter may be anyone with an MSN Messenger account. Sending Eccky to a hotel or on vacation does involve additional costs (sending Eccky to a babysitter does not), and as with Eccky staying in the hospital, users may continue to speak with Eccky via chat but cannot interact with Eccky in the virtual world setting during this time. A user can retrieve their Eccky at any time during a stay away from home. Eccky was closed down in 2007 and until it was launched in a new format in 2009.

== Eccky 2.0 (Since 2009) ==
In 2009, Dutch/Chinese developer TribePlay created a new version of Eccky and launched it in Hyves as one of the first social networking virtual worlds. In Eccky, players can make a character (an Eccky) with their social network profile. After that, they enter the Eccky world. In this world, they have access to various locations, such as a city center, park, mountain top and beach. Players can also visit their own or other users' houses. In any of these virtual locations players can chat, play mini games and do a variety of other things.

Eccky is integrated into Hyves and Facebook. Together with their Hyves or Facebook friends, players can chat, play mini games and post their Eccky's activities on their social networking profile. Eccky has many games. Games can be played in single-player or multi-player format. Ecckies can also play with their Wobble. A Wobble is Eccky's own pet. Wobbles were the first inhabitants of the Eccky world. Wobbles live together with Ecckies and need to be taken care of. Once Ecckies advance in levels, they receive superpowers to be used in the game.
