= Barbarossa (video game) =

1992 video game

- Cover art (illustration by Yasushi Torisawa)
- Developer(s): SystemSoft
- Publisher(s): Sammy
- Platform(s): Super Famicom
- Release: JP: November 27, 1992
- Genre(s): Strategy
- Mode(s): Single-player, multiplayer

Barbarossa (バルバロッサ, Barubarossa) is a 1992 Japan-exclusive Super Famicom strategy video game that revolves around Nazi Germany's involvement in the World War II campaign called Operation Barbarossa.

The game was originally ported from the Japanese personal computer to the Super Famicom.

== Gameplay ==
Gameplay screenshot

The player fights on the Eastern Front of World War II as a senior officer in the Wehrmacht and SS. The object is to capture Moscow and the player is given a timeline between 1941 and 1945 to do so. Cut scenes displayed before the start of the game, in between missions, and after the end of the campaign help to tell the story of the rise and fall of Nazi Germany. A map of Europe that starts in Berlin and ends about hundreds of miles east of Moscow. There are a total of 11 missions in the campaign plus a two-part final mission that portrays the Battle of Berlin.

Each unit has a special ability regarding their speed, searching ability, fuel consumption, and attack power. There are three to five attacking squads within a unit. When one unit attacks another unit, a combat screen appears to resolve the conflict and to show the damage. Customizing each unit before every mission in the campaign is possible as a measure to ensure that each unit has plenty of ammunition, fuel, and fighting strength. Attacking squads range in strength from weak mechanized infantry units to powerful artillery and armored tanks.

Mountains, trees, and settlements are clearly dotted on the map in their appropriate colors. Each type of terrain has its own bonuses for offense, defense, and movement. A typical mission in a campaign lasts for at least 27 turns per side and wind levels come in five degrees of severity. The board is divided into multiple hexagons like in similar turn-based strategy games.

== See also ==
- List of World War II video games
- Koutetsu no Kishi
