= Survival (1984 video game) =

1984 video game

- Developer: Five Ways Software
- Publishers: Macmillan Software; Sinclair Research
- Platform: ZX Spectrum
- Release: 1984
- Genres: Life simulation, educational
- Mode: Single-player

Survival is a ZX Spectrum video game developed by Five Ways Software. It was published by Sinclair Research in association with Macmillan Education in 1984 as part of their "Science Horizons" series. It is an educational game in which the player takes on the role of one of a series of animals, and had to find food to survive while avoiding predators.

== Gameplay ==
Screenshot

The aim was to teach users about food chains; as an insect life is short, with the constant danger of being eaten by a bird - but as an eagle the player is at the top of the food chain with mankind or starvation as the only dangers.

The simulation allows the player to be one of six animals: a hawk, a robin, a lion, a mouse, a fly or a butterfly. The world appears in scrolling grid form, with ice caps to the north and south. The player moves one square at a time, with visibility depending on the chosen animal, avoiding predators and find food and water. The game ends when the animal dies, either through starvation, dehydration, being killed by a predator, or old age.

== Development ==
Survival was developed as part of a series of educational software aimed at children aged between 5 and 12. This "Science Horizons" series was instigated by Sir Clive Sinclair and ex-Prime Minister Harold Macmillan.

== Reception ==
CRASH magazine described Survival as an interesting and enjoyable program which can be used to reinforce learning, or on a self-discovery basis. One criticism was difficulty in remembering the control keys.
