= Givro Corporation =

Japanese video game development company

Givro Co., Ltd.
- Trade name: Givro
- Native name: 株式会社ギブロ
- Romanized name: Kabushiki gaisha Giburo
- Formerly: Almanic Corporation
- Type: Kabushiki gaisha
- Industry: Video games
- Founded: 1989; 37 years ago
- Founder: Takashi Yoneda
- Defunct: 1998; 28 years ago
- Fate: Dissolution
- Headquarters: Tokyo, Japan
- Area served: Japan
- Key people: Noriyuki Tomiyama (president); Takashige Shichijo (development director)
- Products: Video games

Givro Corporation (Note: Japanese: 株式会社ギブロ, Hepburn: Kabushiki gaisha Giburo) was a Japanese video game development company founded in 1989 in Tokyo, Japan by Takashi Yoneda, who was previously employed by Technos Japan and Enix. The company was originally established under the name Almanic Corporation, (Note: 株式会社アルマニック (Kabushiki gaisha Arumaniku)) which it operated under for a few years before changing its corporate name in 1995. Givro would go on to produce games for home consoles such as the Super Nintendo Entertainment System, Sega Genesis, 32X, Nintendo 64, and Sega Saturn. Givro released their final game in late 1997 and quietly dissolved at the end of the following year.

Givro's most critically acclaimed creations were the Enix published Wonder Project J2 on the N64 and Nanatsu Kaze no Shima Monogatari on the Sega Saturn. Enix also published Almanic's most famous titles such as the first Wonder Project J and E.V.O on the SNES.

== Games ==
| Year | Title | Original platform(s) | Publisher | Co-developer | Co-Publisher | Ref. |
|---|---|---|---|---|---|---|
| 1990 | 46 Okunen Monogatari: The Shinka Ron | NEC PC-9801 | Enix | Deltasoft, Dynamic Inc. | —N/a | |
| 1992 | CB Chara Wars: Ushinawareta Gag | Super Famicom | Banpresto | —N/a | —N/a | |
| 1992 | E.V.O.: Search for Eden | Super Nintendo Entertainment System | Enix | Brahman, Cube, Micro Creative | —N/a | |
| 1993 | Mazin Saga: Mutant Fighter | Sega Genesis | Sega | ALU, Team "Saga" | Vic Tokai | |
| 1994 | Shien's Revenge | Super Nintendo Entertainment System | Dynamic Planning | Bee Media, Shuna | Vic Tokai | |
| 1994 | Shin Nekketsu Kōha: Kunio-tachi no Banka | Super Famicom | Technōs Japan | ALU, Mint | —N/a | |
| 1994 | Cosmic Carnage | 32X | Sega | ALU | —N/a | |
| 1994 | Wonder Project J | Super Famicom | Enix | Mint, Omnibus Promotion | —N/a | |
| 1995 | Super Mad Champ | Super Famicom | Tsukuda Original | —N/a | —N/a | |
| 1996 | Wonder Project J2 | Nintendo 64 | Enix | Mint | —N/a | |
| 1997 | Nanatsu Kaze no Shima Monogatari | Sega Saturn | Enix | Buddy Zoo, Crowd, Two Five | —N/a | |
