= WolfQuest =

- Logo for WolfQuest
- Developers: Minnesota Zoo, Eduweb
- Publisher: Eduweb
- Engine: Unity
- Platforms: Windows, Mac, Android, IOS
- Release: October 31, 2007 (Demo); December 21, 2007 (Episode 1: Amethyst Mountain); April 24, 2008 (Episode 1 Deluxe); January 2, 2010 (Episode 2: Slough Creek); October 6, 2011 (Episode 2.5); November 17, 2015 (WolfQuest 2.7 Release, itch.io); March 25, 2016 (WolfQuest 2.7 Release, Steam); September 2, 2016 (WolfQuest 2.7 Release, iOS); September 16, 2016 (WolfQuest 2.7 Release, Android and Kindle); March 13, 2020 (Lost River Classic); September 18, 2020 (Multiplayer); December 30, 2020 (Episode 2: Slough Creek); December 16, 2021 (Episode 2: Slough Creek Multiplayer); December 15, 2022 (Lost River DLC Map); April 11, 2024 (Hellroaring Mountain DLC Map); December 9, 2024 (Saga); June 3, 2025 (Saga Multiplayer); July 22, 2025 (WolfQuest: Anniversary Edition); January 28, 2026 (Tower Fall DLC Map)
- Genre: 3D Life simulation
- Modes: Single-player, Multiplayer

WolfQuest is a 3D wildlife simulation video game originally developed by the Minnesota Zoo and game developer company Eduweb, and developed solely by Eduweb since 2013. The game's main purpose is to help players understand wolves and the roles they play in nature by living the life of a gray wolf in Yellowstone National Park.

In September 2006, the National Science Foundation awarded the Minnesota Zoo and Eduweb a US$508,253 informal education grant to develop WolfQuest. The game was funded by numerous other foundations and donors (including Best Buy) and then distributed as a free download for Mac and Windows computers. In November 2015, Eduweb released WolfQuest 2.7, an improved and expanded version of the game for purchase. In 2017, Eduweb began development of a new version, WolfQuest: Anniversary Edition, a complete remake and expansion of the game.

== History ==
WolfQuest is largely based on the history of wolves in Yellowstone, specifically the re-introduction of gray wolves in 1996 after being extirpated since 1926. Now totaling about 100 wolves in the park today, in 1996 there were 41 wolves released in the Lamar Valley, a playable location in-game. With the Anniversary Edition DLC, players can choose to play as one of the five original wolves who repopulated Yellowstone during the re-introduction: 7F (Leopold pack founder), 42F aka Cinderella (Druid pack leader), 21M (Druid pack leader), 9F (Rose Creek pack founder), or 10M (Rose Creek pack founder); or as one of five wolves who became "famous" among wolf-watchers: The White Lady, 832F aka '06, 755M, 926F aka Spitfire, or 302M aka Casanova. WolfQuest takes place in real-world locations and depicts the geology, common vegetation, and animals that you would see there. Each WolfQuest map recreates a different area of the Northern Range and the gameplay follows the seasons and prey migration patterns.

The game's producer, Dave Schaller of Saint Paul, Minnesota, and the rest of his team members from Eduweb, travel to Yellowstone every other year to access the terrain and make sure their virtual Yellowstone National Park is as close as possible to the real one. Schaller states that some of the top wolf biologists in the country were consulted during game development.

The first playable demo of WolfQuest was released on October 31, 2007. The first episode of the game was released December 21, 2007, as a free, downloadable game for Macintosh and Windows computers. Amethyst Mountain Deluxe, an expansion of the original Amethyst Mountain map, was released April 23, 2008. A second episode of the game, titled Slough Creek: Survival of the Pack, was further released on January 1, 2010. The WolfQuest series has received many revamps, updates, and patches over the course of its development, one of the most notable being the 2.7.2 update on July 4, 2016, featuring graphical improvements to the 3D environment, and many new animals, such as cougars, foxes, and ravens. On November 17, 2015, Wolfquest 2.7, a greatly improved and expanded version of the game, was released. On September 2, 2016, Eduweb released the game for iOS devices, with releases for Android and Kindle devices coming later in the month. The most recent version of the game, WolfQuest: Anniversary Edition, was released for early access on PC/Mac on July 25, 2019. It is a complete remake of the original game, with improved graphics, more animals, and an expanded map. Since then, Eduweb has added the Lost River map from WolfQuest 2.7, multiplayer modes, the Slough Creek episode, a new, reimagined Lost River DLC map and the Hellroaring Mountain DLC map with the addition of wolverines. On January 28th, 2026, Tower Fall, a real location in Yellowstone National Park, was added nine years after it was announced as a DLC, costing $10 USD.

== Gameplay ==
The game has two modes: singleplayer, where the player must find an NPC mate, or multiplayer, where anyone can join (8 players per game) and raise pups together.

=== Singleplayer ===
WolfQuest was initially developed episodically, and the following episodes form the main single-player game arc:

==== Amethyst Mountain ====
In single player, the player must survive as a gray wolf in Yellowstone National Park which has departed from its birth pack (called a "dispersal wolf" in game). To do so, they must hunt elk, moose, and hares, or feed off already-dead elk carcasses. They must also avoid dangers such as grizzly bears, cougars, and non-dispersal wolves. However, it is possible to fight off the bears and cougars by chasing them, and fight off other wolves. The player has the option to find a mate, which will follow and aid the player throughout the rest of the game. In order to find a mate, the player must first earn 800 experience points, mainly by hunting elk, and then search for a mate, which can be found in all territories.

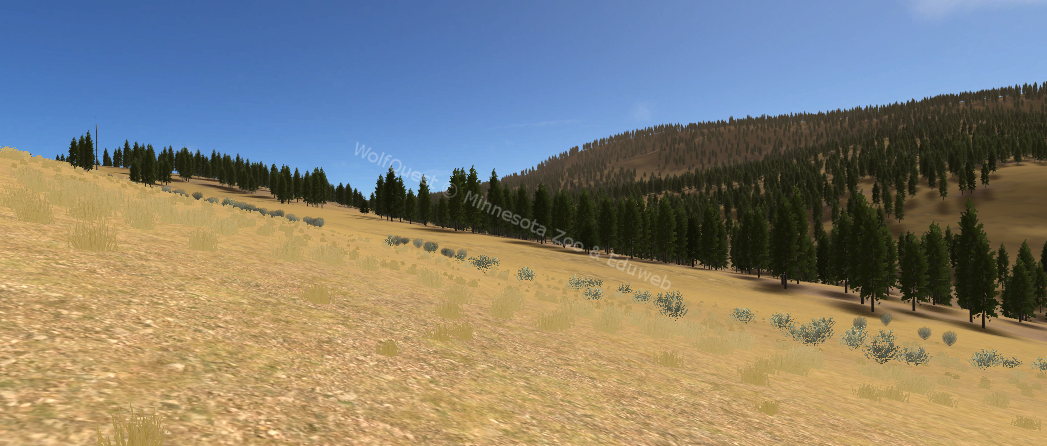
In-game screenshot of Amethyst Mountain (Survival of the Pack)

When creating their wolf character, players are free to choose the gender, fur coloration, stats, and name of their wolf. There are a variety of coats to choose from, with two sliders that let players change the tints of the guard hairs and undercoat of the wolf. WolfQuest 2.7 added many new customization features, including more coats as well as injuries and a radio collar accessory. Just like real wolves, males are larger in size than females.

==== Slough Creek ====
Upon leaving Amethyst Mountain, players (together with their mate) enter the Slough Creek map and search for a den to raise pups. However, after finding a den site, the player must scent mark the area around the den to make it safe from predators and stranger wolves. After completion, the player will obtain pups. Predatory bears, coyotes, eagles, cougars, and wolves roam the map, posing a new threat and attempting to prey on the young pups. At the end, the player, their mate, and their surviving pups must make a journey to a summer den site in the Douglas fir forests. Along the way, they will run into grizzlies, coyotes, and eagles, and are forced to cross a river or drown. NPC wolves' territories will also expand as the chapter progresses, forcing the player to leave Slough Creek.

=== Multiplayer ===
In multiplayer, the objectives of the game are the same as the singleplayer mode with two exceptions. The player cooperates with a maximum of 8 wolves including themself, and can have no NPC mate. Public multiplayer games allow anyone to join. Private games require a game-name and password to join, and allow text and voice chat while in game.

Players in multiplayer can start pack rallies by howling repeatedly, which provide a temporary stamina boost, to hunt bull elk and moose cooperatively. Bull elk have more meat than cow elk and are many times harder to kill. Moose are far more difficult to hunt than any elk, but provide more meat. WolfQuest 2.7 added a multiplayer mode to the Slough Creek mission arc.

=== DLC maps ===
==== Lost River ====
A new map was included with WolfQuest 2.7. Called Lost River, it depicts a fictional valley outside the boundaries of Yellowstone National Park and features both wilderness and urban areas. Humans have abandoned the valley but left clues about some sort of catastrophe. Players are left to speculate what might have happened to them. This map is available for both singleplayer and multiplayer games. On December 15, 2022, Wolfquest: Anniversary Edition released an updated Lost River DLC with an expanded map and the ability to raise pups.

==== Hellroaring Mountain ====
Released on April 11, 2024, this map takes place in a real-world location in north-central Yellowstone, west of Slough Creek overlooking the Black Canyon. Hellroaring Mountain is the largest granite mountain in the park. This DLC introduced wolverines as a rival animal and is 30% larger than the other maps in the game.

==== Tower Fall ====
Released on January 28, 2026, this map takes place in a real-world location called Antelope Creek Watershed, west of Amethyst Mountain below the ancient volcano Mount Washburn. This DLC introduced lynx as a rival animal and features Yellowstone's Grand Loop Trail, which partially runs through the game map allowing players to occasionally see daily sightseeing buses and park ranger trucks. The vehicles are not a threat to the wolves or any other animals.

=== Other in-game animals ===
- Prey animals: elk, hares, moose, pronghorn, mule deer, bison, beavers, cattle
- Rival animals: grizzly bears, coyotes, golden eagles, cougars, red foxes, wolverines, lynx, other wolves
- Miscellaneous animals: common ravens, moles, squirrels, humans, dogs

=== Collectible items ===
- Amethyst Mountain: amethyst crystals, binoculars, handbag, hiking boots, metal bucket, oil lamp, rusty bowl, umbrella
- Slough Creek: fishing pole, flashlight, frisbee, horseshoe, plastic cooler, straw hat, teddy bear, toy shovel
- Tower Fall: bison plush, ice cream cone, junior ranger hat, radio tracking antenna, scat tracker, toy guitar, wine bottle, wolf plush
- Hellroaring Mountain: canteen, chewed collar, coyote decoy, glowstick, hunting cap, leg-hold trap, snowshoes, traffic cone
- Miscellaneous collectibles: antlers, skulls

== Slough Creek: Survival of the Pack ==
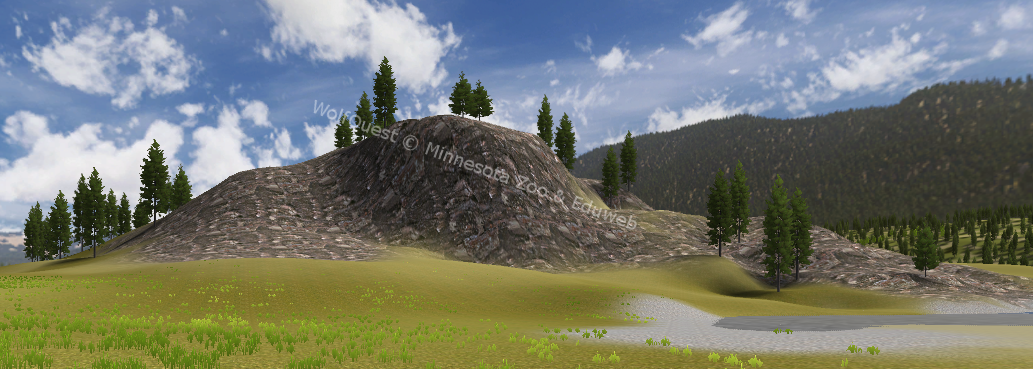
In-game screenshot of Slough Creek (Survival of the Pack)

=== Episode 2.5: Survival of the Pack: Deluxe ===
In August 2010, WolfQuest held an "idea contest" via the WolfQuest Community Forum. The winner for the "Big Idea" section of the contest was the idea "Time and Weather", which would alter hunting conditions based on weather and time of day. The winner for the "Game Enhancement" section was the idea "I need a rest!", where players can make their wolves sit or lie down to regain stamina faster than they would standing still.

Survival of the Pack: Deluxe was released on October 5, 2011, with several new features added to it, including time and weather effects and the ability to rest to regain stamina. It includes both the Amethyst Mountain and Slough Creek. Weather conditions include snow, rain, lightning and fire, and affect scents that can be detected by the player during hunting.

Shortly after the Survival of the Pack: Deluxe release, version 2.5.1 came out on October 11, 2011. It added weather effects, changing the time of day, a new phrase chat, improved lexicon chat safeguards, and other fixes to minor bugs.

=== Development hiatus ===
Between 2011 and January 2014, there were no plans for further development for several years. A third and fourth episode were originally planned for release, as stated on the official website's frequently asked questions page. However, on November 28, 2011, the developers announced that while they were discussing options for future expansions, they were not working on any new game content at the time.

== WolfQuest episode 2.7 development ==
In spring 2014, Eduweb announced that a tablet version of the game was under development, to be released in the near future. Development took more time than anticipated, and platform support was expanded to include Mac and Windows computers. This new version, called WolfQuest 2.7, released in November 2015 for Mac and Windows and in September 2016 for phones and tablets. This version includes the entire game up to that point, plus many enhancements and new features. Following Eduweb's plans to continue with the project's development, the community forums and website will remain online and freely accessible for the foreseeable future, rendering the 2012 announcement outdated as of 2014.

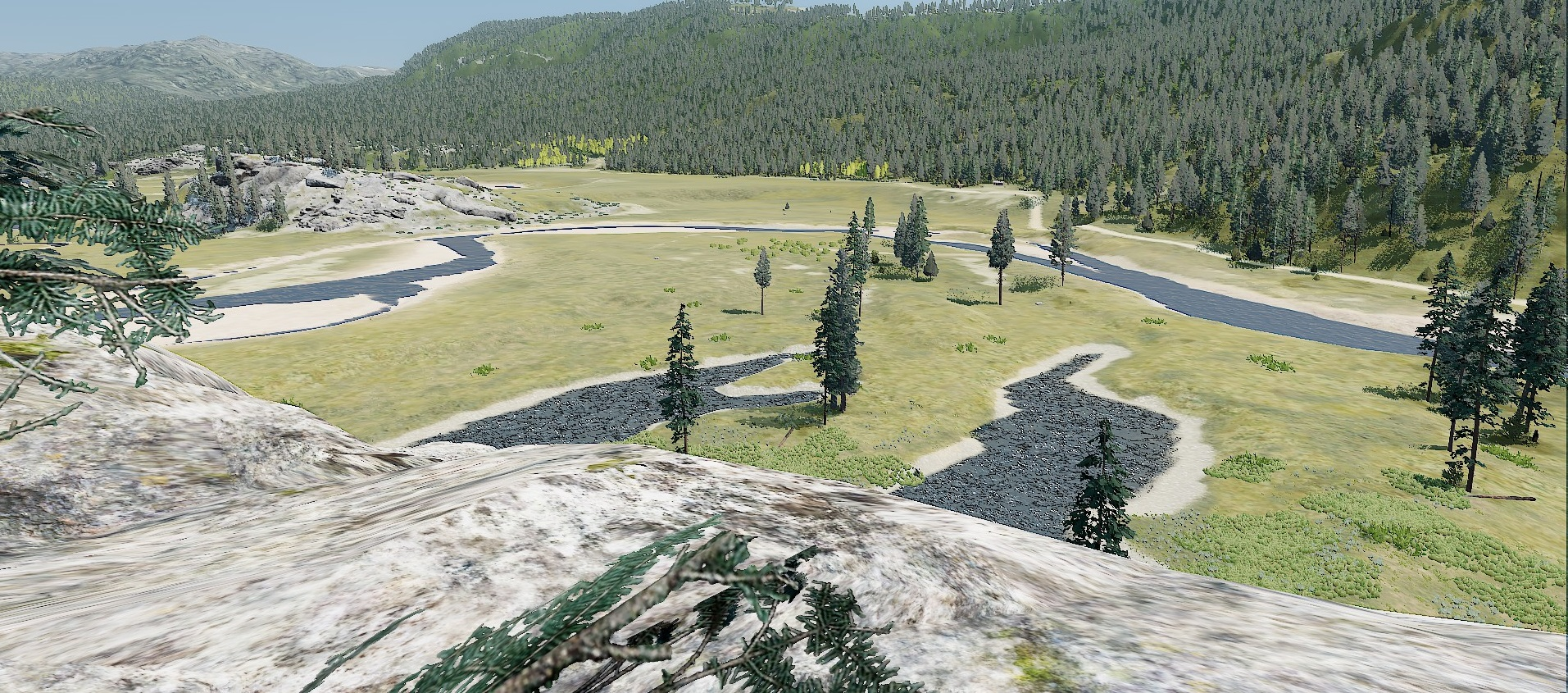
In-game screenshot of Slough Creek (Anniversary Edition)

== WolfQuest: Anniversary Edition ==
=== Development ===
In August 2017, Eduweb announced that development of WolfQuest: Anniversary Edition was underway. This new version, a complete remake and expansion of the original game, would serve as the foundation for new chapters.

WolfQuest: Anniversary Edition includes:

- A 49 square kilometer game world stretching from the Lamar River to the summit of Amethyst Mountain;
- Expanded gameplay, including tracking prey, fighting other wolves, and courting mates;
- Ecological simulation of elk herds and wolf packs;
- Improved graphics;
- Expanded wolf customization;
- Dynamic weather and a day-night cycle.

=== Release ===
Eduweb released WolfQuest: Anniversary Edition in early access on July 25, 2019, for PC and MacOS on Steam and itch.io, with a full release following on July 22, 2025. While in early access, Eduweb updated the game frequently to add more features, multiplayer, and ultimately the Slough Creek episode, including pups, until the game released out of early access on July 22, 2025.

A significant expansion of the game allows the life of the pack to continue beyond the length of one chapter. Pups can grow up, learn to hunt, help with the next year's litter of pups, and eventually disperse from their birth pack - and so on, year after year, until the player-wolf dies. After a grown pup decides to disperse from the pack, the player can choose to start a new game playing as their pup, retaining the same pack territories on the map as when dispersed.

As well as the saga being released December 9, 2024. Tower Fall released on January 28, 2026. As of recent, another expansion known as Katmai Coast, focusing on the life of coastal wolves living on the southeastern shoreline of the Alaskan peninsula, was also announced on July 14, 2026. Many new additions are to be added, including harbor seals, sea otters, salmon and a fishing mechanic to suit the dietary needs of the wolves.

== Reception ==
Reviewers have praised WolfQuest for being a fun and educational way to teach a younger audience about biology and ecology. Randy Salas from the Star Tribune wrote that "authenticity abounds in WolfQuest," and that "the game seems ideally suited for its target age range." Following updates and new releases, reviewers agree that WolfQuest continues to offer new experiences that emulate encounters in the wild. Christy Matte from Common Sense Media says that "WolfQuest is a compelling simulation that's bound to draw kids into what it is like to be a wolf."

WolfQuest is the first computer game to be paid for by the National Science Foundation. Although not highly involved in the development of the game, the zoo's director at the time, Lee Ehmke, stated that the half million-dollar grant is the largest the Science Foundation has ever awarded the zoo.

Programmers faced some challenges in making the game as immersive and realistic as possible while staying within the bounds of government-financed taste. Mating, blood and gore, energy management, and even wolves' sleep schedule presented challenges in making the game appeal to their target audience. Although the game is aimed at children that are slightly older than those typically taken to the zoo, developers still needed to keep the game reasonably tame. For mating, Ehmke stated, "they just rub noses and it goes to black. We gloss over that part of the story. The pups magically appear." Wolves also sleep between 8 and 13 hours per day, determined by several key factors such as seasonality, pack dynamics, and age. To keep the game interesting for kids, programmers had to modify the natural sleeping patterns of both the wolves and other in-game animals to accommodate. For the blood and gore seen during hunting and eating, as well as carcass decomposition, players can adjust gore levels in the game settings from minimal gore to adding extra gore. This setting also pops up the first time the player encounters a carcass.

"In action games, you kill everyone, but wolves don't do that. They chase elk to death. It can take them hours. It's about energy management. We had to modify reality a bit to make it fun to play."

— David Schaller,

=== Accolades ===
Year	Award	Category	Institution	Notes
2008	Special Recognition Award	Serious/Educational Game Development and Multiplayer Development	Unity	Awarded for excellence in a particular area of game design
2009	MUSE Bronze Award	Games	American Alliance of Museums	Awarded for outstanding achievement in Galleries, Libraries, Archives or Museums (GLAM) media
2009	Editor's Choice Award	Games	Children's Technology Review	
2010	Education Award	Top Honors	The Association of Zoos and Aquariums	Awarded for outstanding achievement in educational program design
