= King Arthur's World =

- North American box art
- Developer: Argonaut Software
- Publisher: Jaleco
- Artist: Nigel Brownjohn
- Composer: Justin Scharvona
- Platform: Super Nintendo Entertainment System
- Release: 1992
- Genre: Real-time strategy
- Mode: Single-player

King Arthur's World is a 1992 strategy video game developed by Argonaut Software and published by Jaleco for the Super Nintendo Entertainment System (SNES).

== Gameplay ==
In King Arthur's World, the player controls King Arthur. At the start of each level, only the King is present and various types of troops can be brought out of the tent where he starts. The King and his troops can be commanded to move in a direction, which they do until they receive new orders, are killed or come across enemy troops, which they fight if they can. Also, some troops have special commands, such as for archers to fire arrows.

The aim of each level is to proceed from the tent at the start to the finishing point. This may require the player to defeat various enemies, avoid traps and obstacles. King Arthur is the only essential character. If he dies, the player has failed and play can only continue if 100 gold coins are spent to rescue him, in which case the player restarts at their tent. The game can be played with a standard controller or, alternatively, with the Super NES Mouse.

== King Arthur's World Mobile ==
In 2018 some of the original makers of the game had reunited to redevelop King Arthur's World, initially for mobile platforms.
