= Pieces (video game) =

1994 video game

- North American cover art by Bryan Ballinger
- Developer: Prism Kikaku
- Publishers: JP: Hori Electric; NA: Atlus USA
- Director: Kōichi Kitazumi
- Producer: Sadao Hashiguchi
- Composer: Nobuyuki
- Platform: Super NES
- Release: JP: July 22, 1994; NA: December 1994
- Genre: Puzzle
- Modes: Single-player, multiplayer

Pieces (known in Japan as Jigsaw Party (ジグソーパーティー) is a 1994 puzzle video game for the Super NES. It was developed by Prism Kikaku and published by Hori Electric in Japan and by Atlus Software in North America. In the game, the player has to solve jigsaw puzzles. In 2002, the spiritual successor developed by the same company, Jigsaw Madness, was released for the PlayStation.

== Gameplay ==
The player can face either a computer or up to five human players. The computer players come at three difficulty levels (easy, normal or hard) and feature a wide array of opponents, such as a crab made out of a rice bowl and a beautiful laughing mermaid. A few puzzles must be solved before the opponent's puzzle is solved. If the player is quick enough, items will appear. These can do anything from guiding the puzzle pieces to freezing the opponent.

== Release and reception ==
Reception

Review scores
Publication	Score
AllGame	4/5
Electronic Gaming Monthly	8/10, 8/10, 8/10, 8/10, 8/10
Famitsu	7/10, 6/10, 7/10, 5/10
Game Players	81%
Next Generation	3/5
VideoGames	9/10

Pieces was released for the Super Famicom in Japan on July 22, 1994, and for the Super Nintendo Entertainment System in North America in December 1994. GamePro's Earth Angel judged the game as "an interesting variation on the standard puzzler theme". He praised the solid challenge, easy controls (particularly with the use of the Super NES Mouse) and the variety of puzzles.

Mike Weigand of Electronic Gaming Monthly similarly described Pieces as "unique" with solid challenge, but singled out the two-player "Versus Mode" as the game's strongest feature. The magazine's team of five reviewers scored it an 8.2 out of 10. A reviewer for Next Generation commented positively on the large number of puzzles and the intensity of the two-player "Versus Mode", and gave the game three out of five stars, concluding, "Although it doesn't touch, say, Super Bomberman in the party game category, this title is still its own sort of blast."
