= Akihiko Mori =

Japanese video game composer

Akihiko Mori (森彰彦) born 1966, was a Japanese video game music composer who worked for Copya System Ltd., later becoming a member of Mint Co., Ltd. where he worked with other composers. Mori died of stomach cancer on January 8, 1998.

== His works ==
=== Game Boy ===
- Popeye 2
- Volley Fire
- Zen-Nippon Pro Wrestling Jet
- Zettai Muteki Raijin-Oh

=== Mega Drive / Genesis ===
- Cutie Suzuki no Ringside Angel

=== PC Engine ===
- Power Drift

=== Super Famicom / Super NES ===
- Acrobat Mission
- Bassin's Black Bass with Hank Parker (Super Black Bass 2)
- Galaxy Robo
- Gokinjo Boukentai
- Keiba Yosou Baken Renkinjutsou
- Kidou Senshi Z-Gundam: Away to the NewType
- Koutetsu no Kishi
- Koutetsu no Kishi 2: Sabaku no Rommel Shougun
- Koutetsu no Kishi 3: Gekitotsu Europe Sensen
- Lennus II: Fuuin no Shito (Sound Design-Performer)
- Mystic Ark
- Otoboke Ninja Colosseum
- Paladin's Quest (Sound FXs)
- Seifuku Densetsu: Pretty Fighter
- Shien - The Blade Chaser (Shien's Revenge)
- Shounen Ninja Sasuke (Sound Design)
- Super Air Diver (Lock On)
- Wonder Project J

=== Sega Saturn ===
- Seifuku Densetsu: Pretty Fighter X

=== Nintendo 64 ===
- Wonder Project J2

=== PlayStation ===
- Doraemon 2: SOS! Otogi no Kuni
- Pro Wrestling Sengokuden
- Pro Wrestling Sengokuden 2
