= Kōtetsu no Kishi 3: Gekitotsu Europe Sensen =

1995 video game

- Developer: Dual
- Publisher: Asmik Ace Entertainment, Inc
- Designer: Takashi Abe
- Composer: Akihiko Mori
- Platform: Super Famicom
- Release: JP: January 27, 1995
- Genres: Strategy, war game
- Modes: Single-player, multiplayer

Kōtetsu no Kishi 3: Gekitotsu Europe Sensen (鋼鉄の騎士3 −激突ヨーロッパ戦線−; lit. "Steel Knights 3: Clash on Europe Front") is a Super Famicom strategy video game about Europe during World War II.

The player can play as either Nazi Germany or the Allied forces. The game is mostly in Japanese, although ASCII letters can be used when typing in names. Once in the game mode, the X button is used to confirm orders. Each stage has its own individual background sound that provides additional tension to the atmosphere. It is the final game in the Kōtetsu no Kishi trilogy, following Kōtetsu no Kishi and Kōtetsu no Kishi 2: Sabaku no Rommel Shōgun.

== Gameplay ==
=== General gameplay ===
There are three difficulty levels: easy, medium, and hard. There is also fuel and ammunition to consider when planning strategy for offense or defense. Once all combatant units are eliminated or once everyone runs out of ammo and/or fuel, the battle is resolved. The game can end in a draw, however, if fuel or ammunition runs out and there are still a decent amount of combat units on both sides of the conflict. The actual battle scenes play like a dice game with the player having the least amount of luck in two different rounds losing his units, similar to Risk.

There are different scenarios from 1939 to 1945, with all the major battles covered from the Nazi invasion of Poland (resulting a decisive victory ). A hidden 16th scenario appears after the player successfully finishes all 15 of the scenarios that the game originally provides.

=== Construction mode ===
This mode allows the player to take one of the scenarios and customize them. Using the construction mode, a battle can take place using the seasons of winter or summer, involve either one or two players, and players can even replace the units and the drivers that are involved in the battle. For example, Poland can have Soviet or German tanks for an equal confrontation with the Nazi forces in the battle for Poland during the month of September 1939.

== See also ==
- SNES Mouse
- List of World War II video games
