= Lion (video game) =

1995 video game

- Developer: Manley & Associates
- Publisher: Sanctuary Woods
- Platform: MS-DOS
- Release: NA: December 16, 1995
- Genre: Life simulation
- Mode: Single-player

Lion is a 1995 animal simulation video game for MS-DOS where the player takes the role of a lion. It was published by Sanctuary Woods in 1995 as a follow-up to Wolf.

== Gameplay ==
The gameplay is divided into two parts. The first is a sandbox simulation mode, where the player has no predetermined goal. The second is a scenario mode, where the player has to complete specific actions; this is comparable to quests given in RPGs.

As in the original, the player takes on the role of a lion chosen from a pool of 20 different animals, with varying attributes, in existing prides or handpicked groups made by the player. The player can control a single animal or all members of a pride.

Unlike Wolf, which takes place in three different locales, Lion is played only on the savannas and plains of the Serengeti National Park in Tanzania (though in four different seasons).

Also includes a "Lion Safari", an interactive tour of the leonine life on the Serengeti.

== Reception ==
Reception

Review scores
Publication	Score
Next Generation	4/5
Computer Game Review	77/68/74
PC Games	B

A Next Generation critic commented, "Sanctuary Woods hit a home run with its predator simulation Wolf. Its next title in the series, Lion, continues the trend by demonstrating in a very entertaining way what life can be like for large, aggressive creatures living in today's wilds." While remarking that the controls take considerable time to get used to, he found the game to ultimately be both educational and entertaining, and scored it four out of five stars.
