= Odell Down Under =

1994 video game

- Developer(s): MECC
- Publisher(s): SoftKey
- Platform(s): Classic Mac OS, Windows
- Release: 1994
- Genre(s): Educational
- Mode(s): Single-player

Odell Down Under is a 1994 game for Microsoft Windows and Classic Mac OS that takes place in the Great Barrier Reef of Australia. Released by MECC, it is the sequel to Odell Lake.

== History ==
Odell Down Under was released alongside a re-release of its companion game, Odell Lake. The game was recommended for ages 9 to adult.

The game was generally praised; School Library Journal cited the "realistic and beautiful" graphics and detailed field guide as strengths, while Booklist called it a "marvelous introduction to life in a thriving underwater community". The game was a finalist for MacUser's 1994 Editor's Choice Award for Children's Software.

== Gameplay ==
The player takes on the role of a fish who in turn must eat, stay clean and avoid being eaten by predators to survive. There are several modes of gameplay. In Tournament mode, the player plays every fish in the game, starting as the tiny silver sprat and eventually reaching the great white shark. A shorter Challenge mode picks four random fish (from smallest to largest) instead. The player can choose to play any fish in Practice Mode.

Finally, in Create-A-Fish the player creates their own species based on various parameters such as size and agility, which also affect the appearance of the fish. The color, special ability, and nocturnal or diurnal habits are also selected. Special moves, also present for some 'real' fish, include the stingray's sting and the cuttlefish's ink squirt.

Each fish has different preferences for food, as described in the educational summary before the game starts. The game consists of nine screens, arranged in three levels from the sandy bottom to the reef's top, that various fish, including the player, move through looking for food. To survive, or to gain enough points to reach the next fish, the player's fish has to find enough food (which can include plants, crustaceans or coral as well as fish) to prevent its constantly decreasing energy bar from reaching 0 and death. The other main concern, besides avoiding predators, is health, which can only be repaired by finding a bluestreak cleaner wrasse while playing as a diurnal fish, or a banded coral shrimp while playing as a nocturnal fish, and moving next to it. Health takes a serious drop if the fish eats something poisonous to it, often a sea slug or sponge.

The game also includes a field guide with information about the tropical fish featured in the game. Some versions included a teacher management system, allowing teachers to track students' scores and change preferences such as sound and music.
