= Wonder Project J2 =

1996 video game

- Nintendo 64 cover art
- Developer: Givro Corporation (Note: Additional work by Mint.)
- Publisher: Enix
- Director: Takashi Yoneda
- Producer: Hiroki Fujimoto
- Designer: Takashi Yoneda
- Programmers: Hiromitsu Shioya; Noriyuki Tomiyama; Seiji Kato
- Artists: Akihiko Yamashita; Keiichi Sato
- Writer: Takashi Yoneda
- Composer: Akihiko Mori
- Series: Wonder Project J
- Platforms: Nintendo 64, iOS
- Release: Nintendo 64: JP: November 22, 1996; iOS: JP: April 12, 2010
- Genre: Life simulation
- Mode: Single-player

Wonder Project J2 (Note: Known as Wonder Project J2: Josette of the Corlo Forest (Japanese: ワンダープロジェクトジェイツー: コルロの森のジョゼット, Hepburn: Wandā Purojeku Jei Tsū: Koruro no Mori no Jozetto) in Japan.) is a 1996 life simulation game developed by Givro Corporation and originally published by Enix for the Nintendo 64. It is the sequel to Wonder Project J, which was released in 1994 for the Super Famicom.

== Gameplay ==
Nintendo 64 version screenshot

Wonder Project J2 is a bishōjo life simulation game similar to its predecessor, where the player communicates with Josette, a robot who is trying to become human, through her robot, Bird. The player answers her questions on-screen by selecting "yes" or "no". Josette cannot hear or see the player, but learns about the player through successive binary questions. For example, "if I am going to a party should I wear this?", she recalls the answers later throughout the story. The player can command Josette through Bird, though she does not always listen. Player advancement through the game is dependent on how well their teachings mesh with other activities on the island. After teaching Josette a series of fundamental human interactions, the plot-driven second chapter guides Josette through a series of hardships and confrontation with the Siliconian Army.

== Synopsis ==
Wonder Project J2 takes place after the events of Wonder Project J. Josette is a girl Gijin (robot) created by Dr. Geppetto, who built Pino 15 years prior. Having just completed Josette, the aged doctor had little time to raise her, so the player assists. Messala, antagonist of the previous game, receives orders from king Siliconian XIII to "find the girl who lives on the island of Corlo who is in possession of the J", an object of great power capable of giving Gijin humanity and realize their dreams. Siliconian armies are dispatched to find the girl at Corlo island. Before dying, Geppetto tells Josette to leave Corlo for Blueland island, where she will meet someone to help her. However, Blueland is occupied by the Siliconian Army harvesting Proton, a mineral fuel source.

== Development ==
Givro Corporation began talks of a sequel to Wonder Project J quickly after its December 1994 release.

== Release ==
Wonder Project J2 was first released for the Nintendo 64 by Enix in Japan on November 22, 1996, packaged with a game-themed Controller Pak. Interest about the game was sparked in North America by previews from western publications such as Electronic Gaming Monthly and Next Generation, and Nintendo Power featured it in their "Epic Center" section as one of its last appearances before it was discontinued due to lack of role-playing games on Nintendo 64. When asked about a possible North American release from Nintendo, Nintendo Treehouse member Jim Henrick stated he did not know when it would be published, as Enix ceased distribution of their titles in the region. Though initially planned as a Nintendo 64 exclusive, Enix later announced a PlayStation port with additional animated sequences which would not fit within the memory limitations of the Nintendo 64 Game Pak in 1997, but this version was never released. Because Wonder Project J2 was never published outside Japan, a fan translation was released in 2007. Square Enix re-released the game as a two-part download for mobile phones in Japan on April 12, 2010.

== Reception ==
Reception

Review scores
Publication	Score
Famitsu	8/10, 8/10, 9/10, 8/10
GameSpot	5.2/10
Joypad	80%
N64 Magazine	55%
Super Game Power	4/5
64 Extreme	75/100

Wonder Project J2 received largely positive reviews. The four reviewers in Famitsu said the game was superior to the previous game, with one reviewers saying any sluggishness in it is gone and being able to see the characters interactions is better than the previous numeric rating.GameSpot gave it a 5.2 out of 10 score. N64 Magazine gave it 55%. 64 Extreme gave it 75%. German magazine Total! praised the game. 1UP.com noted that the 3D sections felt awkward. Nintendo Life strongly praised the game.
