= Saurian (video game) =

- Developer: Urvogel Games
- Publisher: Urvogel Games
- Engine: Unity
- Platform: Windows
- Release: August 2, 2017 (early access)
- Genres: Survival, simulation
- Modes: Single-player, multiplayer

Saurian is an upcoming survival simulation video game developed and published by American studio Urvogel Games for Microsoft Windows. It focuses upon accurately simulating the natural ecosystem of the Hell Creek Formation in an interactive format where players take control of a dinosaur. The game uses the Unity engine as its base. It was launched on Steam as an early access game on August 2, 2017. Versions were also planned for MacOS and Linux, but have yet to be released as of 2026.

== Gameplay ==
Saurian is a survival simulation game focused on the life of a dinosaur. The game is set in the Hell Creek Formation during the Cretaceous. Locales include woods and rivers. Originally, the player would take on the role of a lightly feathered Dakotaraptor. New playable animals were subsequently added, including Tyrannosaurus, Triceratops, Pachycephalosaurus, Anzu and Ankylosaurus.

As a Dakotaraptor, the player has a family consisting of parents and siblings. The player's goal is to survive through life, which requires eating and sleeping. A scent-tracking feature is used to locate other dinosaurs, as well as lizards which can be consumed for nourishment. The player starts out with a biting ability. Upon growing into a young adult, the player can leap onto other dinosaurs and tear into them using its toe claws. Older raptors ignore the player as a baby, but will fight back as the player ages and becomes a competitor for food. The player's Dakotaraptor parents sometimes resort to cannibalistic behavior, or may abandon the player.

== Development and release ==
Saurian was developed by Urvogel Games, based in Duluth, Minnesota. The game was conceived by Nick Turinetti, a dinosaur enthusiast who owned a 10-percent stake in Urvogel. Turinetti conceived the idea for a dinosaur simulation game around 2008, after playing a dinosaur shoot 'em up game, which sparked an interest in developing a scientifically accurate dinosaur game. Over the years, Turinetti would carry around a notepad to write down ideas whenever he felt inspired. He eventually began assembling a team of developers to put the game together.

Saurian was largely inspired by Jurassic Park: Operation Genesis (2003), although other games were also influential, including Jaws Unleashed (2006), Spore (2008), and Red Dead Redemption (2010). Turinetti finalized the basic concept around early 2013, when part-time development began, with the use of the Unity game engine. The development team conducted various research into dinosaurs to ensure up-to-date authenticity, an idea supported by paleontologists who expressed interest in the project. An emu, owned by one of the game's animators, was studied as a model for the game's dinosaurs. Hell Creek was chosen as the game's setting due to an extensive amount of research that had been undertaken there. The developers sought to accurately recreate the area's prehistoric flora and fauna.

Urvogel launched a Kickstarter campaign in May 2016, hoping to raise $55,000 to fund full development of the game. The necessary funds were raised in two days, and the campaign closed a month later, raising more than $220,000. Turinetti credited the desire for dinosaur accuracy – including feathered dinosaurs – as the reason for the Kickstarter's success. The development team consisted of approximately 14 people from around the world who worked on the game remotely. The team worked together using Skype, Discord, and Dropbox. Differences in time zones presented challenges for the team, which was divided across four continents. Turinetti served as the project manager.

Saurian was released for Microsoft Windows on August 2, 2017, as an Early Access game on Steam. It had also been planned for release on MacOS and Linux. A virtual reality version was also planned. However, the game is only available for Windows as of 2026.

== Reception ==
Christopher Livingston of PC Gamer found the game difficult when playing as the Dakotaraptor. Alec Meer of Rock Paper Shotgun described the game as "more Walking With Dinosaurs than Jurassic World". He found the gameplay repetitive, and questioned whether new playable dinosaurs would be enough to sustain players' interest in the game.
