= Hellroaring Mountain =

Mountain in Montana, United States

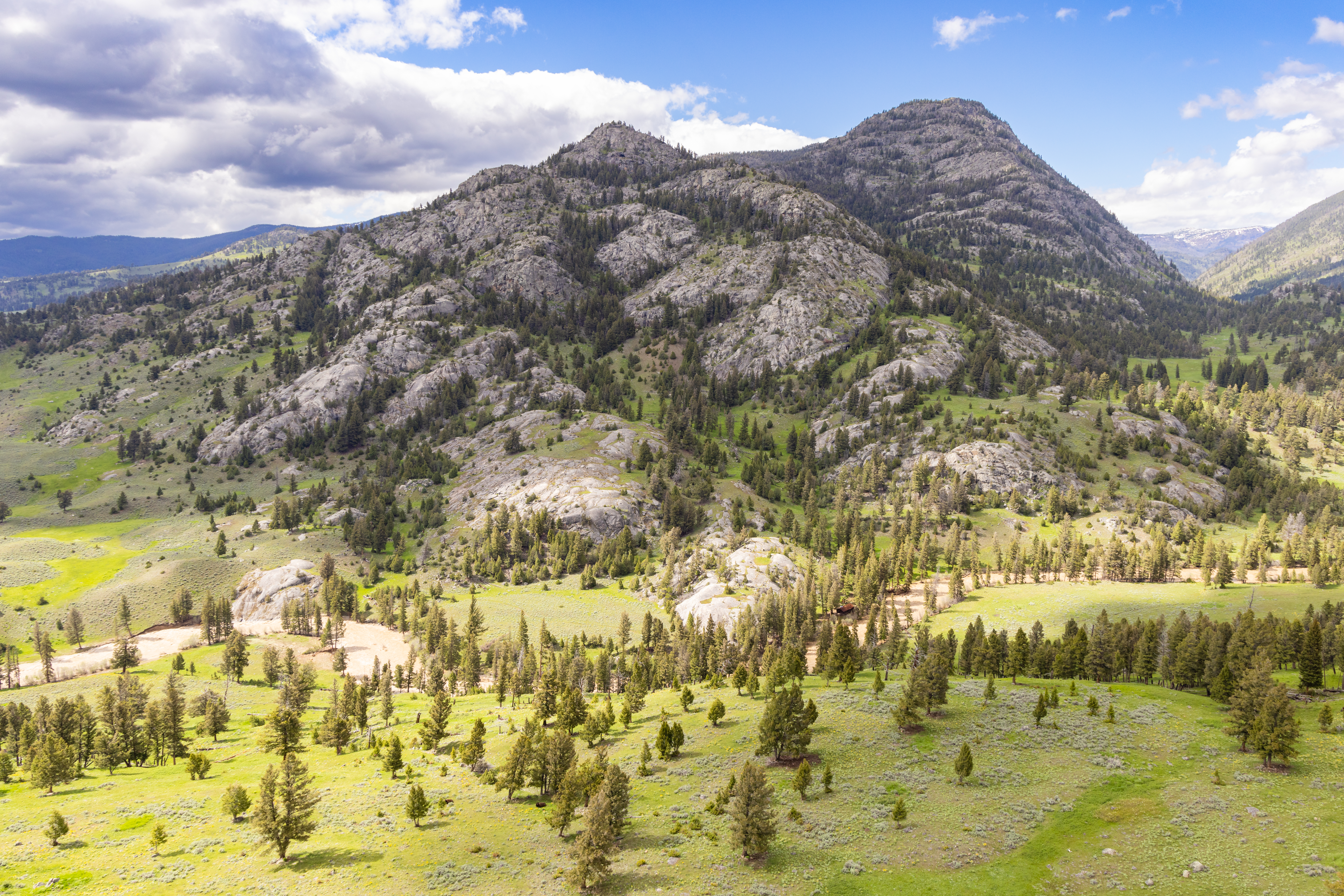
- South aspect

Highest point
- Elevation: 8,374 ft (2,552 m)
- Prominence: 439 ft (134 m)
- Isolation: 1.24 mi (2.00 km)
- Coordinates: 45°00′10″N 110°26′40″W

Naming
- Etymology: Hellroaring Creek

Geography
- Location within Montana Location within the United States
- Country: United States
- State: Montana
- County: Park
- Protected area: Yellowstone National Park
- Parent range: Absaroka Range; Rocky Mountains
- Topo map: USGS Specimen Creek

Geology
- Rock age: Precambrian
- Rock type(s): Gneiss, Schist, Granite

Hellroaring Mountain is an 8,374-foot (2,552-metre) summit in Park County, Montana, United States.

== Description ==
Hellroaring Mountain is located in the Absaroka Range which is a subrange of the Rocky Mountains. It is set within Yellowstone National Park, with the summit in Montana and the lower south slope in Wyoming. Precipitation runoff from the mountain's slopes drains into Hellroaring Creek which is a tributary of the Yellowstone River. Topographic relief is significant as the summit rises 2,200 feet (671 meters) above the creek in 0.6 miles (0.97 km) and 2,750 feet (838 meters) above the river in 2.3 miles (3.7 km). The mountain is composed of Precambrian gneiss, granite, and schist. This rock is an anomaly in Yellowstone Park and is significantly older than the volcanic rock that is common in the park. Hellroaring Mountain is the largest outcropping of granite in the park, and the 2.7-billion years old rock is some of the oldest exposed rock in the world. The mountain is located at the bend of Hellroaring Creek and was so named by prospectors in 1867. The mountain's toponym was officially adopted as Hell Roaring Mountain in 1930 by the United States Board on Geographic Names, then officially amended to Hellroaring Mountain in 1965. However, it did appear in publications as Hellroaring Mountain as early as 1891, and was recorded as '"Hell-Roaring Mountain" by Ferdinand Vandeveer Hayden in 1872. The Hellroaring Fire burned thousands of acres near the mountain during the Yellowstone fires of 1988.

== Climate ==
Based on the Köppen climate classification, Hellroaring Mountain is located in a subarctic climate zone characterized by long, usually very cold winters, and mild summers. Winter temperatures can drop below 0 °F with wind chill factors below −10 °F.

== See also ==
- Geology of the Rocky Mountains
- List of mountains and mountain ranges of Yellowstone National Park

== Gallery ==
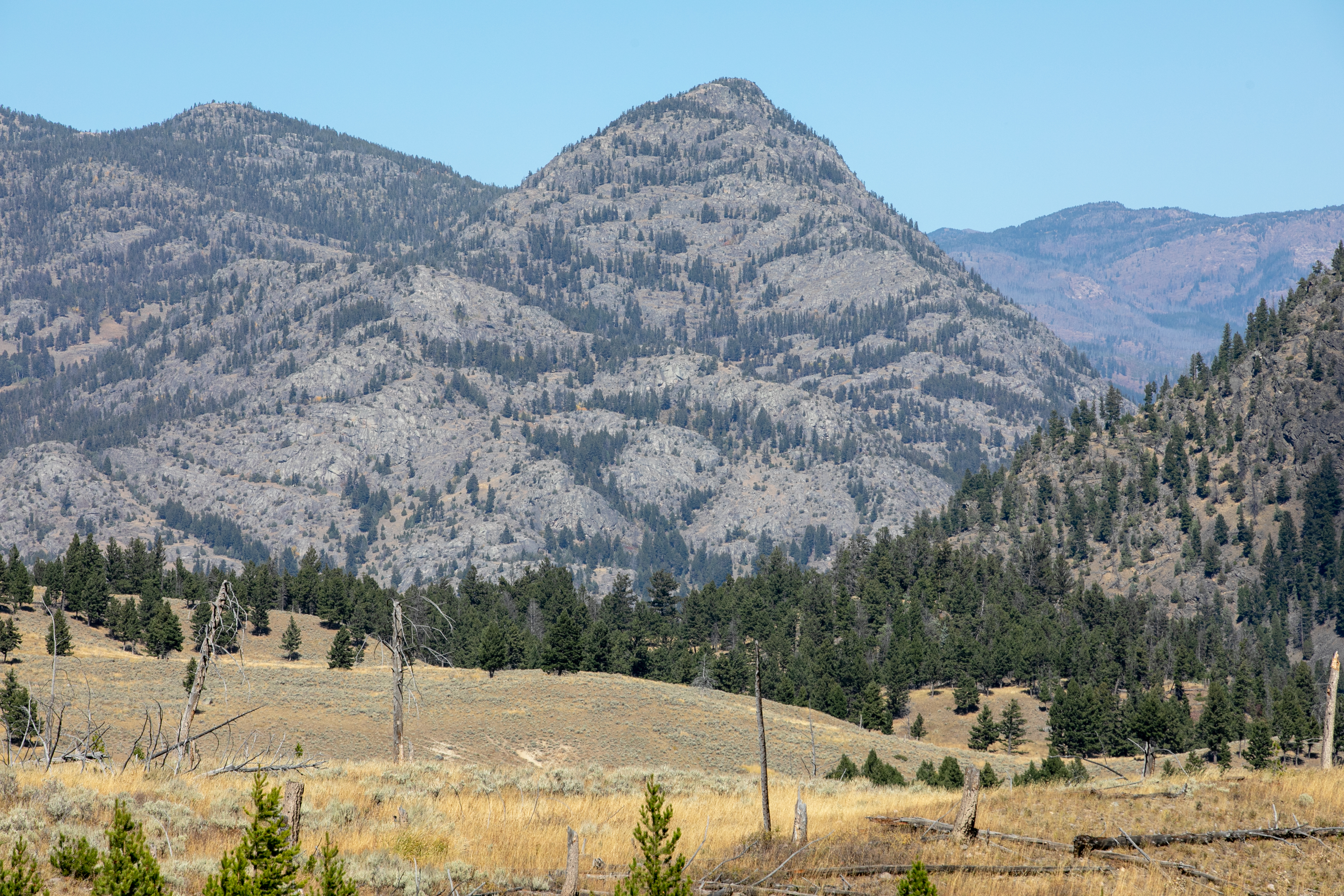
South aspect

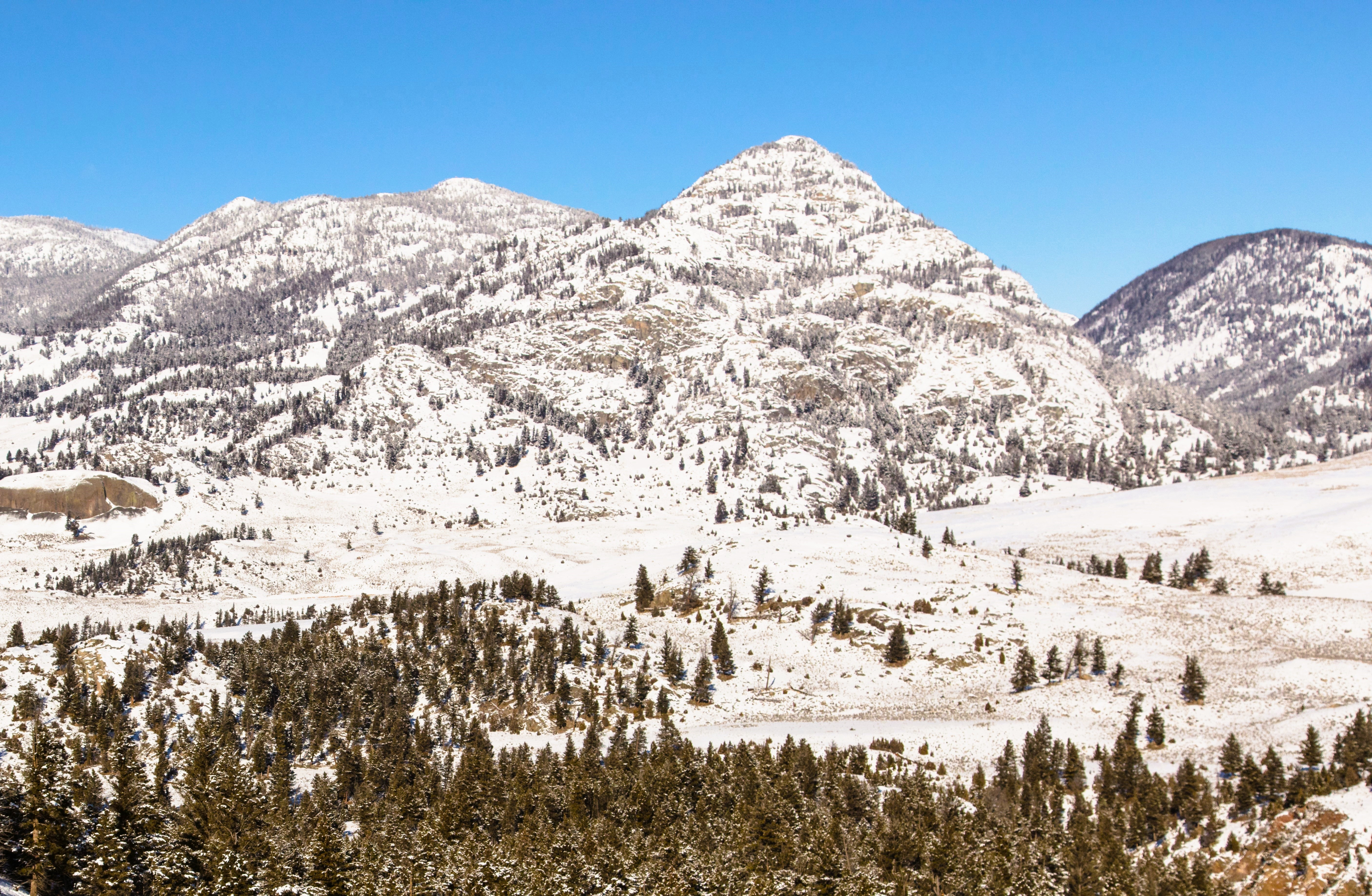
Hellroaring Mountain in winter

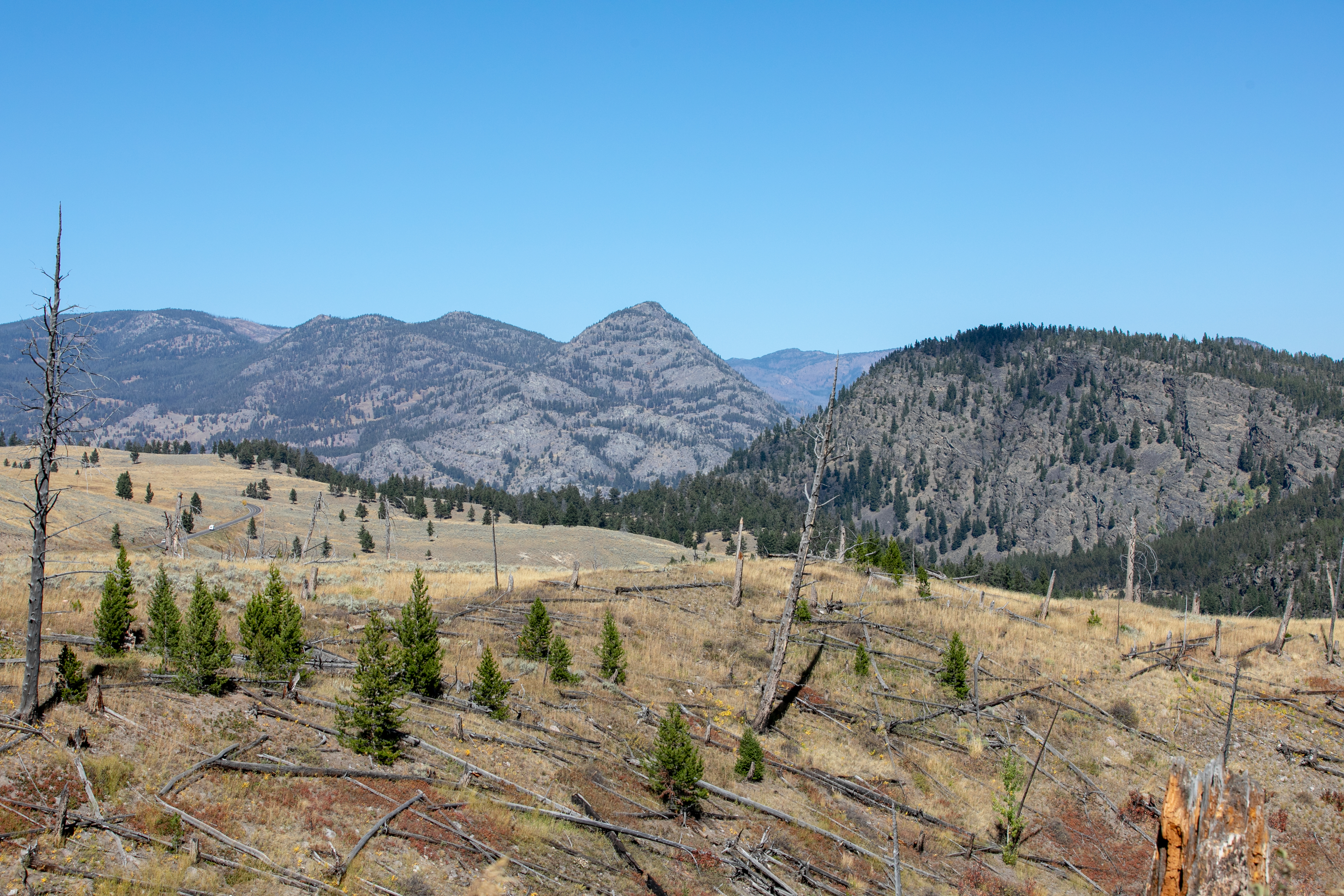
Hellroaring Mountain centered and Garnet Hill (on the right)
