= Wonder Project J =

1994 video game

- Developer: Almanic Corporation (Note: Additional work by Mint and Omnibus Promotion.)
- Publisher: Enix
- Director: Takashi Yoneda
- Producer: Hiroki Fujimoto
- Designer: Takashi Yoneda
- Programmers: Hiroko Yamahiko; Hiromitsu Shioya; Takashi Sorimachi
- Artists: Toshihiro Kawamoto; Umanosuke Iida
- Writer: Takashi Yoneda
- Composer: Akihiko Mori
- Series: Wonder Project J
- Platform: Super Famicom
- Release: JP: 9 December 1994
- Genre: Life simulation
- Mode: Single-player

Wonder Project J (Note: Known as Wonder Project J: Machine Boy Pino (Japanese: ワンダープロジェクトJ: 機械の少年ピーノ, Hepburn: Wandā Purojeku Jei: Kikai no Shōnen Pīno) in Japan.) is a 1994 life simulation video game developed by Almanic Corporation and published by Enix for the Super Famicom. In the game, the player cares for a boy Gijin (robot) created by Dr. Geppetto named Pino. Directed by Takashi Yoneda, the title was created by most of the same personnel that worked on previous projects at Almanic such as E.V.O.: Search for Eden. It was met with positive reception from critics and sold over 1.3 million copies in Japan, making it one of the best-selling Super Famicom games. A sequel, Wonder Project J2, was released in 1996 for the Nintendo 64.

== Gameplay ==
Gameplay screenshot

Wonder Project J is a life simulation game in which the player raises a Pinocchio-like boy named Pino, who displays a very large amount of animations to make him appear more human. The game uses Pino's fairy companion Tinker as a point and click interface like an adventure game, with the main objective being to educate Pino to make him more human. This can be accomplished by scolding him when he does something wrong and praising him when he does something right.

The player collects a variety of items during the adventure. Some are used to train the parameters of his character (strength, kindness, etc.), some are consumables which instantly adjust his character parameters (pudding increases his trust, batteries increase his health, etc.), while others are used to teach him certain behaviours (sowing seeds, fighting with a sword, etc.).

Pino needs to succeed in various challenges and confrontations to activate virtue circuits and eventually “Circuit J”. These tasks are accomplished based on the parameters of his character (is he strong enough, does he have enough luck, etc.) The purpose of the last circuit is to help with the final task to foster relations between humans and the robot-like Gijin.

Pino has two health bars. One is physical health while the other is mental health. Physical tasks (like climbing up a rope) or getting hurt reduces physical health. Mental tasks (like reading a book) or being offended reduces mental health. Some tasks may reduce both health bars.

Pino may sleep to restore health in exchange for a small amount of money and the passing of one day. The day counter does not affect the game, except for certain tasks like farming and setting out to sea.

Upon finishing the game, Dr. Geppetto and Tinker encourage the player to start again, finishing each act within a certain amount of days, in order to get the secret ending.

== Development and release ==
Wonder Project J was developed by Almanic Corporation, which also developed E.V.O.: Search for Eden, in conjunction with Mint and Omnibus Promotion. Takashi Yoneda served as the project's director, as well as designer and writer. Hiroki Fujimoto also served as producer. Yoneda recalled on his personal website that he had a hard time understanding the concept of communicating with a character via a point and click interface, however he succeeded in realizing the game due to cooperation with anime director Umanosuke Iida. Yoneda said he used both Sekai Meisaku Gekijō and works from Toei Animation as models for world building. Yoneda has since regarded the title as "the most thoughtful and deep work" for him. Japanese animator Toshihiro Kawamoto also worked as an artist for the game and illustrated the cover art.

Wonder Project J was first released for the Super Famicom by Enix in Japan on 4 December 1994. An official strategy guide was also released in Japan by Enix. Since the game was never published outside Japan, a fan translation was released in 2001.

== Reception ==
Reception

Review scores
Publication	Score
Famitsu	(SFC) 28/40
PlayStation Magazine (JP)	(SFC) 22.6/30
Super Game Power	(SFC) 4.2/5.0

In April 1995, Famitsu's "Reader Cross Review" section gave Wonder Project J a 7 out of 10. The game was a commercial hit, with sales of 1.3 million units in Japan alone. Hardcore Gamer gave the title a positive retrospective outlook. In 2011, 1UP.com's Bob Mackey listed it among the "Six Must-Play Super Nintendo Imports".

== Sequel ==
A sequel, Wonder Project J2, was developed by Givro Corporation (previously Almanic Corp.) and released by Enix for the Nintendo 64 in 1996, serving as one of the last projects by Givro prior to their dissolution in 1998. The sequel was later re-released by Square Enix as a two-part download for mobile phones in Japan in 2010.
