= Real Lives (video game) =

2001 video game

RealLives
- Logo from the 2010 release of RealLives
- Developer: Educational Simulations / Neeti Solutions
- Publisher: Neeti Solutions
- Platform: Cloud
- Release: 2001, 2007, 2010, 2018
- Genres: Education, simulation
- Modes: Laptop & Desktop Version

RealLives is a 2001 educational video game originally designed by Educational Simulations. It is now operated by Neeti Solutions (Pune, India). The third version of the game is currently running after including player feedback. The game allows players to live out lives of randomly generated people. In the game players can choose their jobs, social activities, and start families. Part of their decisions are affected by real statistical data. For example, if your character was born a girl in India, a database of Indian girl's names would be consulted as well as a database of Indian cities, Indian health statistics, etc. Throughout the game players lives can be affected by random events such as floods, war, disease, accidents, and other major life-changing events. Players get to play from the moment of birth until they die in the game. Features from the 2010 edition of the game include a three-dimensional face for the player's character and family, the ability to start a business, and Google Maps connectivity to show the exact place the character is born.

Different countries mean different possibilities for the player's character. Character information is randomized and partly based on what country you are in.

== Gameplay ==
The game is structured in rounds which represent a year. You can make decisions about your education, profession, leisure, relationships, and if you want to live with your parents and how you spend your money when moved out. There are also certain sudden events that need an instant decision.

You have 12 attributes which are health, resistance, happiness, intelligence, artistic, musical, athletic, strength, endurance, appearance, conscience, and wisdom. Every year events can occur, and the character's attributes change. People can get sick or change their jobs or relationships. There can also be regional natural disasters or warfare. During most of the events, additional information is available which can be accessed by clicking on the "Learn More" button. This information can explain the origin or effect of an illness, the possibility of natural catastrophes as well as actual structures in society and state. Some of the events happening do not have an effect on the game but teach players the way things happen in the real lives of other people.

== Reception ==
Rock Paper Shotgun said that "everyone should play it at least once in their own lives." But it also criticized the game for turning characters into "numbers on a stats screen, beset by a random number generator". PopMatters praised the game's social messaging.

== See also ==
- 1 in 8 Billion
