= E.V.O.: Search for Eden =

1992 video game

- North American cover art
- Developer: Almanic
- Publisher: Enix
- Director: Takashi Yoneda
- Producer: Keizo Mochizuki
- Designer: Takashi Yoneda
- Programmers: Saburou Contora; Tetsuya Furuta; Hiromitsu Shioya
- Artist: Masahiro Hirasawa
- Composer: Koichi Sugiyama
- Platform: Super NES
- Release: JP: December 21, 1992; NA: July 15, 1993
- Genre: Action role-playing game
- Mode: Single-player

E.V.O.: Search for Eden (Note: The game was titled 46 Okunen Monogatari ~Haruka naru Eden E~ (４６億年物語 はるかなるエデンへ; "4.6 Billion Year Story: To Distant Eden") in Japan.) is a 1992 action-adventure game developed by Almanic Corporation and published by Enix for the Super NES. Combining traditional platforming mechanics with experience and leveling mechanics originating from role playing games, E.V.O.: Search for Eden involves the player navigating a creature through a number of side-scrolling levels while undergoing bodily evolution to cope with ever-changing environments. It is heavily based on Almanic's original title, 46 Okunen Monogatari ~The Shinka Ron~ ( 4.6 Billion Year Story: The Theory of Evolution), released in Japan in 1990 for the PC-9801.

Spanning a period of over a billion years, the game's story involves Gaia, daughter of the sun and mystical embodiment of the Earth, guiding the player through five distinct geological periods of the planet's history. Beginning the game as a fish, the player must travel across the planet defeating enemies and gaining the strength to evolve into more powerful and complex organisms before eventually earning a chance to enter the paradise realm of Eden, becoming Gaia's immortal partner. Most critics enjoyed the originality of E.V.O.: Search for Eden, but criticized the tedious gameplay and subpar graphics.

== Gameplay ==
E.V.O.: Search for Eden is a side-scrolling platform game where players must navigate a creature of their own design five geological periods. The periods include: the Cambrian Period and the Ordovician Period of the Paleozoic Era ("The World Before Land") from 500 million years ago to 450 million years ago, then the Carboniferous period ("Early Creatures of Land"), the Mesozoic Era ("Age of Dinosaurs"), the late Neogene period ("Ice Age"), and finally the early Quaternary period ("Early Man"). Each period has its own map screen, which is divided into various levels. While each era takes historical liberties with both its inhabitants and time frames, the player's choices for evolution are dependent on the current era of play, ranging from aquatic bodies during the Age of Fish to mammalian physiology during the Age of Man.

As the player progresses through each level, other organisms are encountered who must be confronted by biting, ramming them with horns, jumping on them until they are defeated, or jumping over them to avoid them. Defeated enemies leave behind meat which the player can consume to grant them "evolution points" used towards upgrading specific body parts. The body of the character controlled by the player is divided into eight sections which can be upgraded by spending evolution points, making them stronger as well as changing their appearance. New abilities such as greater jumping ability and increased movement speed can also be obtained through evolution.

During gameplay, the player will also encounter crystals that either display hints and tips, grant large amounts of Evolution Points or transform their character into a unique body for a limited time. As the player takes damage from enemy creatures, one may restore health at any time by either consuming the meat of their foes, eating nearby plant life, or by undergoing selective evolution. At the end of each level, the player must face a stronger boss character in order to progress, requiring much more effort to defeat than a typical foe. There is no game over mechanism, if the player's character loses all their health points the player is revived by Gaia and sent back to the game's map screen with a deduction of roughly half of their Evolution Points. The game utilizes a built-in battery backup save system for storing game data. The player may record progress directly to the cartridge to be continued at another time, and store up to fifty previously created creatures using the game's built-in "Book of Life" feature. Creatures stored in this index have the option to be recalled at any time when the player encounters special crystals during the quest.

== Plot ==
Biting one of the few remaining dinosaurs in Chapter 4 (the Ice Age) as an early mammal hybrid. The upper bars show the player's health, as well as their current evolution points for that stage.

E.V.O.: Search for Eden tells a mythical saga of life's evolution on Earth, with a subtext of a creation myth and polytheistic evolution. The player takes the role of one of many billions of lifeforms created by Gaia (personification of the planet Earth), the nurturing and benevolent daughter of Sol, the Sun. Among the creatures known as life, there is a competition to evolve, and the best lifeform will eventually be granted the privilege of entering the Garden of Eden and becoming the husband and partner of Gaia. As the game progresses, it soon becomes apparent some mysterious external force is interfering with evolution on Earth in a destructive manner. Strange crystals not native to Gaia appear across the planet, and creatures that eat the crystals are transformed into monstrously powerful beings that dominate all other lifeforms, overconsume resources and disrupt the flow of evolution. In each Age, the player character is tasked with confronting the species transformed by the crystals and defeating them so that the evolution of life can continue as intended.

In the final Age, the Age of Eden, the player learns a mysterious entity is controlling the world's other lifeforms and sending them against the player. This entity turns out to be Bolbox, a lifeform that has evolved into a freakish and evil advanced being by consuming the crystals, believing itself to be the first human, but in reality is a gigantic single-celled organism. In the game's final battle, the player and Bolbox fight to determine who will gain entry into Eden and become Gaia's partner. Bolbox is defeated, and the player joins Gaia in Eden and is granted the gift of intelligence. It is also revealed the crystals were introduced to Earth by an advanced civilization on Mars, who misguidedly wished to help Earth by speeding its evolution with the crystals. Upon realizing the dangers the crystals create, the Martians decide to leave Earth alone and observe until it becomes advanced enough for them to interact with.

== Development ==
Screenshot from 46 Okunen Monogatari ~The Shinka Ron~ on the NEC PC-9801. The game served as the model on which E.V.O.: Search for Eden would be based.

E.V.O.: Search for Eden was developed by Almanic Corporation in early 1992 and was headed by project director Takashi Yoneda, who had designed Quintet's Actraiser three years prior. The title was largely based on the company's earlier successful role-playing game E.V.O.: The Theory of Evolution under the Japanese title 46 Okunen Monogatari ~The Shinka Ron~ (４６億年物語 －THE進化論－; "4.6 Billion Year Story: The Theory of Evolution"), released for the NEC PC-9801 home computer in 1990, and carries over much of the game's theme, designs and story. Although the design staff had opted to give a fantastic rather than scientific representation of evolutionary theories and planet development, the crew was assisted by teachers from local schools to provide information on geology and biology to the programmers. While some of the game's designers were similar to that of the original PC-9801 title, much of the staff for the Super Nintendo Entertainment System version was made up of a younger, less experienced crew, which Yoneda stated made things "interesting" during development.

The North American version was translated and marketed by Enix America Corporation. While originally planned for a March 1993 release, the game was beset by last-minute delays for several months until the following June. The company would later hold a promotional contest where players could send in photographs of their favorite customized creatures for a chance to win a free Enix game.

=== Music ===
The music for E.V.O.: Search for Eden was originally composed by Koichi Sugiyama for 46 Okunen Monogatari ~The Shinka Ron~. Motoaki Takenouchi, a former student of Sugiyama's, adapted the music for E.V.O.. In late 1992, select pieces from the game were performed by the Tokyo City Philharmonic Orchestra during their second annual Game Music Concert series in Tokyo, Japan. Two of these pieces, "Great Hymn of Nature, Earth" and "Sorrow" were made available on the Orchestra Game Music Concert 2 album the following November. In December of the same year, an official soundtrack for 46 Okunen Monogatari ~The Shinka Ron~ was released exclusively in Japan by Apollon Records. Rather than featuring the same instrumentation present in the game, the 46 Okunen Monogatari Symphonic Synth Suite soundtrack was composed of music also re-recorded and arranged by Takenouchi.

== Reception ==
Reception

Review scores
Publication	Score
AllGame	2/5
Famitsu	7/10, 5/10, 8/10, 6/10
Super Play	47 / 100

In Famicom Tsūshin, Hamamura Tsūshin said it may appear like a lesser game compared to the developers' other RPGs, but its careful design made it more addictive in comparison to more story-driven RPGs. A second reviewer found it lacked interesting surprises and that gaining experience points felt like a chore and that the action elements were flawed. The final reviewer found it to be an enjoyably simple game that may be perfect for "people who find "Sim Something" complicated and tedious."

GamePro magazine praised the game's originality and overall design but found fault with the visual presentation of the title, stating "although this game has an interesting concept, the sluggish game play and average graphics may make you return to the caves." The publication also found the background music lacking, stating the game's compositions ranged from "soothing" to "annoying". Nintendo Power called attention to the game's ingenuity and theme, remarking that "[t]he idea of this game is great and the weird creatures you can evolve can be both bizarre and hilarious." However, the magazine felt the game's representation of the concept of evolution was too fanciful, also stating the process of obtaining power-up items being "tedious". Nintendo Power would later give the game an honorable mention during its "Top Titles of 1993" awards segment as one of the most innovative games of the year.

AllGame was even less positive about the game, giving it two stars out of five. They praised the challenge that the bosses presented, and the quantity of creatures the player could evolve into, but noted that the game was "marred by mediocre graphics and sluggish gameplay." Although not officially released in Europe, the game was covered in an import review by Super Play in late 1993 and although they found the game's strategy components to be "top-notch", the rest of the game was regarded as "very mediocre", garnering only a 47% average score.

Later retrospective reviews of the game were largely positive. In February 2007, IGN ranked E.V.O.: Search for Eden second in its list of the greatest "Prehistoric Games" of all time, stating "[n]o other title before or since has so effectively captured the essence of evolutionary theory in videogame form." The website additionally likened the title to the then-upcoming and highly anticipated Spore by Maxis, calling E.V.O.: Search for Eden the "original success story" in life-simulation gaming and the standard for which it would be judged. The same website rated the game 42nd on its Top 100 SNES Games. They praised the game commenting: "One of the most brilliantly original game designs ever conceived."
