= List of Maxis games =

This is a list of games created by Maxis. Maxis is an American video game developer that was founded in 1987 and became a division of Electronic Arts (EA) in 1997. Maxis' second software title was the seminal SimCity, a city simulation and planning game. Maxis is the creator of the best-selling PC game of all time, The Sims, and its sequel, The Sims 2. These three titles and their related products are the brand's most popular and successful lines.

Most of the Maxis titles are simulation-based, though none are considered traditional simulations. Maxis founder Will Wright likens them as "digital dollhouses". Maxis has also released games developed by other production houses, such as A-Train and SimTower.

== Games ==
Year	Title	Platform(s)	Notes
1988	SkyChase	Amiga, Atari ST	
1989	SimCity	Amiga, Commodore 64, DOS, Macintosh	
1990	SkyChase	DOS	
1990	SimCity	Atari ST	
1990	SimEarth: The Living Planet	DOS, Macintosh	
1991	Mysterium	Game Boy	
1991	RoboSport	Macintosh, Amiga, Microsoft Windows	
1991	SimCity	Super Nintendo	
1991	SimAnt	DOS, Macintosh, Microsoft Windows	
1992	SimEarth: The Living Planet	Amiga	
1992	SimLife	DOS, Macintosh	
1993	El-Fish	DOS, Macintosh	Published by Maxis
1993	Rome: Pathway to Power	DOS	Published by Maxis
1993	SimCity 2000	DOS, Macintosh, Microsoft Windows	
1993	SimCity: Enhanced CD-ROM	DOS	
1993	SimFarm	DOS, Macintosh	Published by Maxis
1993	SimLife	Amiga	
1993	SimRefinery	DOS	Unreleased prototype made to simulate Chevron's Richmond refinery,
1993	Unnatural Selection	DOS	
1994	SimCity 2000	Amiga, OS/2 Warp	
1994	SimHealth	DOS	Published by Maxis
1994	SimTower: The Vertical Empire	Macintosh, Microsoft Windows	Published by Maxis
1994	Wrath of the Gods	Microsoft Windows	Distributed by Maxis
1995	Read-A-Rama	Microsoft Windows	Distributed by Maxis
1995	Spell-A-Rama	Microsoft Windows	Distributed by Maxis
1995	Marty and the Trouble with Cheese	Macintosh	Published by Maxis
1995	Tony La Russa Baseball 3	DOS	
1995	SimCity	Microsoft Windows	
1995	SimCity 2000	Sega Saturn	
1995	SimCity: Enhanced CD-ROM	Macintosh	
1995	SimFarm	Microsoft Windows	
1995	SimIsle: Missions in the Rainforest	DOS	Published by Maxis
1995	SimTown	Macintosh, Microsoft Windows	
1995	Full Tilt! Pinball	Macintosh, Microsoft Windows	European title: Pinball '95
1995	Widget Workshop: The Mad Scientist's Laboratory	Macintosh, Microsoft Windows	Published by Maxis
1996	A-Train	PlayStation	Published by Maxis
1996	SimCity 2000	PlayStation	
1996	SimCity 2000: Network Edition	Microsoft Windows	
1996	SimCopter	Microsoft Windows	
1996	SimGolf	Microsoft Windows	
1996	SimIsle: Missions in the Rainforest	Macintosh, Microsoft Windows	Published by Maxis
1996	SimPark	Macintosh, Microsoft Windows	
1996	SimTunes	Microsoft Windows	
1996	Full Tilt! 2 Pinball	Microsoft Windows	European title: Pinball '97
1996	The Crystal Skull	Macintosh, Microsoft Windows	Published by Maxis
1997	Fathom: The Game of Tiles	Microsoft Windows	
1997	Kick Off 97	DOS, Microsoft Windows	Published by Maxis
1997	Marble Drop	Microsoft Windows	
1997	Streets of SimCity	Microsoft Windows	
1997	Tony La Russa Baseball 4	Microsoft Windows	Published by Maxis
1998	SimSafari	Macintosh, Microsoft Windows	
1999	SimCity 3000	Microsoft Windows	
2000	SimCity 3000 Unlimited	Microsoft Windows	
2000	The Sims	Microsoft Windows	
2002	The Sims Online	Microsoft Windows	
2003	SimCity 4	Microsoft Windows	
2003	The Sims	GameCube, PlayStation 2, Xbox	Assisted Edge of Reality
2003	The Sims: Bustin' Out	Game Boy Advance	Assisted Griptonite
2003	The Sims: Bustin' Out	GameCube, PlayStation 2, Xbox	
2004	The Sims 2	Microsoft Windows	
2004	The Urbz: Sims in the City	GameCube, PlayStation 2, Xbox	
2005	The Sims 2	Macintosh, GameCube, PlayStation 2, Xbox, Nintendo DS	
2007	The Sims: Pet Stories	Microsoft Windows	
2008	Spore	Microsoft Windows	
2008	Spore Creature Creator	Macintosh, Microsoft Windows	
2008	Spore Creatures	Nintendo DS	Assisted Griptonite
2009	The Sims 3	Macintosh, Microsoft Windows	
2010	The Sims 3	PlayStation 3, Xbox 360, Nintendo DS, Nintendo Wii	
2011	The Sims 3	Nintendo 3DS	
2011	Darkspore	Microsoft Windows	
2013	SimCity	Macintosh, Microsoft Windows	
2014	The Sims 4	Macintosh, Microsoft Windows, PlayStation 4, Xbox One	Working on updates and expansions packs after initial release
2018	The Sims Mobile	iOS, Android	In 2019, development of the game and its updates has been transferred from Maxis to Firemonkeys Studios

== Cancelled games ==
Cancellation year	Title	Platform(s)	Notes
1997	Crucible	Unknown	Developed by Maxis South. A dungeon crawler similar to Diablo.
1997	Nightfall	Unknown	Developed by Maxis South.
1997	Remnants	Unknown	Developed by Maxis South.
1997	The Mindwarp	PC	A 3D shooter similar to Descent, was set to be released in mid-1996.
Unknown	SimCastle	Unknown	Cancelled in favor of The Sims. Targeted towards a young demographic.
Unknown	SimMars	PC	Cancelled in favor of The Sims. Realistic Mars colonization simulation game.
2001	SimsVille	Windows	

== See also ==
- Electronic Arts
- List of Sim video games
