= Mike Perry (game developer) =

American video game designer and producer

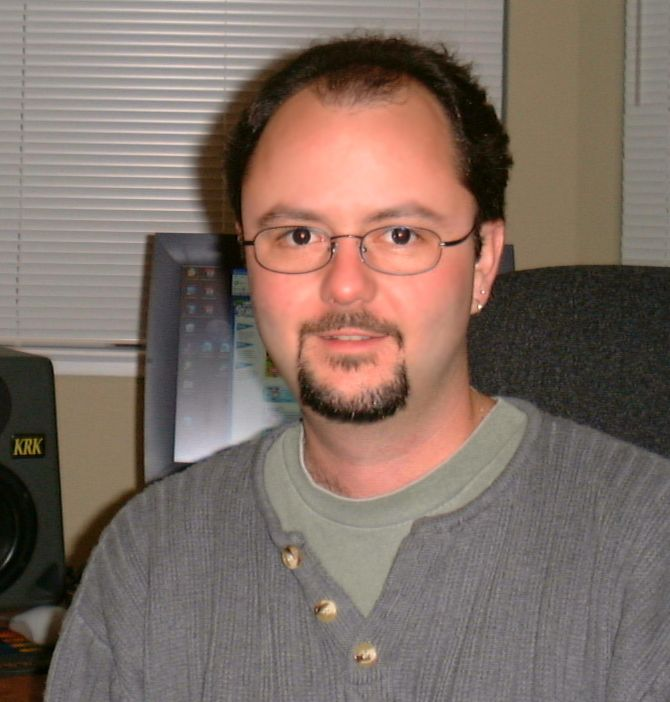
- Mike Perry in 2004
- Born: 1969 (age 55–56)
- Occupation(s): Game designer, producer
- Employer(s): Maxis; Electronic Arts; Zynga

Mike Perry (born 1969) is the former creative director at Maxis and Electronic Arts, where he worked on many of the Sim games. He produced and designed the award-winning title SimFarm, and both produced and programmed Yoot Saito's award-winning title SimTower. As of 2011, he is an executive producer at Zynga, managing the FarmVille game.

== Biography ==
Perry's first game was an Astrosmash clone, which he wrote in BASIC on a Timex Sinclair 1000 at the age of 13. He lived at Pensacola Naval Air Station, as his stepfather was an officer in the U.S. Navy. Perry was a C64 enthusiast in high school, using it to teach himself how to program games and BBS applications. His stepfather later took a job as medical professor at the University of South Alabama, which school Perry attended as well, studying music. However, he dropped out before graduating, to explore a musical career and move to California.

For the next two years he worked part-time at the videogame booth in a Toys R Us store, and played rhythm guitar for a local heavy metal band. He then decided to seek an actual career in the game industry, cold-calling various companies in the Bay Area, and finally obtaining a job as a "Game Counselor" (telephone support) at Hudson Soft. Over the next two years his duties expanded within the company, including work on such games as Bomberman 2 and Super Adventure Island.

In 1992, Perry was hired by Jeff Braun of Maxis to work as a project manager, doing what was called "Maintenance Producing," supporting updates on existing products such as SimEarth and SimCity. Perry was then given a new project, SimFarm, which he produced and co-designed with engineer Eric Albers. The game won the Codie award in 1993 from the Software Publishers Association as "Best Secondary Education Program." The following year, Perry produced Yoot Saito's SimTower, which won the CODiE for Best Simulation Program. He was one of the employees who stayed with the company when it was acquired by Electronic Arts in 1997.

He has given talks at the Game Developers Conference, and in 2003, published a series of "Designer Diaries", documenting the development of the console version of The Sims.

In 2011, Perry left Maxis/EA, and as of July 2011 is working at Zynga, where he is executive producer of FarmVille.

== Works ==
Year	Title	Role	Ref.
Maxis
1993	SimFarm	Producer and designer	
1994	SimTower	Producer	
1994	SimHealth	Producer	
1994	Klik & Play	Producer with Europress	
1995	SimCity Classic	Producer and programmer	
1996	SimCity 2000 Network Edition	Producer and designer	
1996	SimCopter	Programmer	
1997	Streets of SimCity	Designer	
Electronic Arts
2000	The Sims	Designer	
2000	SimCity 3000 Unlimited	Programmer	
2002	The Sims Online	Programmer	
2003	The Sims: Bustin' Out	Designer	
2003	SimCity 4: Rush Hour	Tester	
2004	The Urbz: Sims in the City	Designer	
2006	The Godfather: The Game	Creative director	
2009	The Godfather II	Creative director	
2011	Darkspore	Executive producer	
Zynga
2011	FarmVille	Executive producer	
