= List of Sim video games =

This is a list of Sim games, their expansion packs, and compilations. Most games were developed by Maxis and published either by Maxis (pre-1997 acquisition by Electronic Arts) or by Electronic Arts (post-1997). EA has marketed and recruited companies such as Bullfrog Productions, Firaxis Games, and Tilted Mill Entertainment to develop several games under the Sim brand.

Release timeline
1989	SimCity
1990	SimEarth
1991	SimAnt
1992	SimLife
1993	SimFarm
1993	SimCity 2000
1994	SimTower
1994	SimHealth
1995	SimIsle
1995	SimTown
1996	SimGolf
1996	SimCopter
1996	SimTunes
1996	SimPark
1997	Streets of SimCity
1998	SimSafari
1998	Yoot Tower
1999	SimCity 3000
1999	Sim Theme Park
2000	The Sims
2001	SimCoaster
2002	Sid Meier's SimGolf
2002	The Sims Online
2003	SimCity 4
2003	The Sims Bustin' Out
2004	The Sims 2
2004	The Urbz: Sims in the City
2005
2006
2007	The Sims Stories
2007	SimCity Societies
2007	MySims
2007	The Sims 2: Castaway
2007	SimCity DS
2008	Spore
2009	SimAnimals
2009	The Sims 3
2010
2011	The Sims Medieval
2011	Darkspore
2011	The Sims FreePlay
2012
2013	SimCity
2014	SimCity: BuildIt
2014	The Sims 4
2015
2016
2017
2018	The Sims Mobile
2019
2020
2021
2022
2023
2024
2025
2026	The Sims Mobile (discontinued)
TBA	Project Rene

== SimCity series ==
- SimCity (1989)
- SimCity 2000
- SimCity 64
- SimCity 3000
- SimCity 4
  - SimCity 4: Rush Hour
- SimCity DS
- SimCity Societies
  - SimCity Societies: Destinations
- SimCity DS 2 (SimCity Creator)
- SimCity Creator
- SimCity Social
- SimCity (2013)
  - SimCity: Cities of Tomorrow
- SimCity: Buildit

=== Compilation packs ===
- SimCity 2000 Special Edition
- SimCity 3000 Unlimited
- SimCity 4 Deluxe Edition

== Spore ==
- Spore
  - Spore Creature Creator
  - Spore Galactic Adventures
  - Spore Bot Parts Pack
- Spore Origins
- Spore Creatures
- Spore Hero
- Spore Hero Arena
- Darkspore

== Other Sim games ==
- SimEarth
- SimAnt
- SimLife
- SimFarm
- SimRefinery (commissioned by Chevron)
- SimTower (developed by OPeNBooK; titled The Tower in Japan)
- SimCopter
- Streets of SimCity
- SimHealth (developed by Thinking Tools)
- SimIsle (developed by Intelligent Games)
- SimTown
- SimPark
- SimGolf
- SimTunes
- SimSafari
- Sim Theme Park (developed by Bullfrog Productions; titled Theme Park World in Europe)
- SimCoaster (developed by Bullfrog Productions; titled Theme Park Inc. in Europe)
- Sid Meier's SimGolf (developed by Firaxis Games)
- The Sims Carnival
- SimAnimals

=== Compilation packs ===
- Sim 3-Pack: Tower, Tunes, Isle (Released in 1998 for Windows, it includes SimIsle, SimTower and SimTunes.)
- Sim 3-Pack: Life, Town, Ant (Released in 1998 for Windows, it includes SimAnt, SimTown and SimLife.)
- Sim 3-Pack: Farm, Safari, Earth (Released in 1999 for Windows, it includes SimSafari, SimFarm and SimEarth.)
- Sim Mania (Released in 2000 for Windows, it includes SimCity, SimTower, SimIsle, SimCopter, Streets of SimCity and SimSafari.)
- Sim Mania for Kids (Released in 2000 for Windows, it includes SimTown, SimPark, SimSafari, SimTunes, Widget Workshop and SimAnt.)
- The Sim Collection (Released in 2003 for Windows, it includes SimTheme Park Gold Edition, The Sims Deluxe Edition, SimCity 3000 Unlimited and The Sims Online New & Improved.)
- Sim Mania 2 (Released on March 19, 2003, for Windows, it includes SimCity 3000, SimTheme Park Gold Edition, SimCoaster and Sid Meier's SimGolf.)
- Sim Mania 3 (Released on June 21, 2005, for Windows, it includes SimCopter, SimSafari, SimTheme Park Gold Edition, SimCity 3000 Unlimited, SimCoaster and Sid Meier's SimGolf.)
- The SimCity Box (Released on June 30, 2008, for Windows, it includes SimCity 4 Deluxe Edition, SimCity Societies, SimCity Societies: Destinations, The Sims Carnival SnapCity and Spore Creature Creator.)

== Cancelled games ==
- SimsVille – Cancelled almost at completion to focus efforts on The Sims 2 development.
- SimMars – Was in development at Maxis around the same time as the release of The Sims. A trailer for the game was included on the SimCity 3000 CD-ROM. From the trailer, the premise of the game seemed to be a human mission to the planet Mars, followed by a terraforming and colonization scenario, typical of the Maxis world-building game style. The game presumed to be an integration of previous Maxis titles, presented in 3D, possibly including elements of SimEarth, SimLife, and SimCity. On May 12, 2000, Maxis announced that the game was put on hold. A reference and some sound effects were recycled into an arcade game in The Sims Vacation. The game was remade by fans as a complete total conversion mod for SimCity 4, and is in beta 3 phase.
- MySims Social – A game intended to launch on Facebook with The Sims Social and SimCity Social, it never was completed.
- The Urbz 2 – A game intended to surpass The Urbz: Sims in the City, and turn it into a spinoff sub series to The Sims, but the project went through Development Hell after the original game failed to sell to expectations. It was in development first at Maxis for the PlayStation 2, Nintendo GameCube and Xbox, before being sent over to Electronic Arts Chicago in 2006, where it had some design changes such as being moved to next generation platforms PlayStation 3, Xbox 360 and Nintendo Wii, but the project was cancelled when the studio closed on November 6, 2007, leaving the project incomplete and never released. Assets, logos and other content could be found on The Sims 2 for PlayStation 2's DVD with model viewers, as the game used the same source code and engine as The Urbz 2.

=== Discontinued games ===
Some Sim games are no longer possible to play, as they required connections to servers that no longer exist, and as such have been discontinued. Below they are listed alongside their official shutdown dates.

- The Sims Online (August 1, 2008)
- The Sims Social (June 14, 2013)
- SimCity Social (June 14, 2013)
- Darkspore (March 1, 2016)

Additionally, the online modes of The Sims Bustin' Out and for the PC version of MySims were retired August 1, 2008 and June 2011, respectively.

== See also ==
- List of Maxis games
- List of simulation video games
