= SimCity (1989 video game) =

1989 video game

- 1990 North American box art, depicting a jukebox with a picture of a city being hit by the "Tornado" disaster. The initial 1989 release of the game featured the "Monster" disaster on the jukebox which was changed over the unauthorized usage of the Godzilla-esque monster.
- Developer: Maxis (Note: Archimedes and Electron versions developed by Superior Software; SNES version developed by Nintendo EAD and Intelligent Systems; mobile version developed by Babaroga.)
- Publisher: Maxis: Infogrames (Europe) Acornsoft (Archimedes) Fujitsu (FM Towns) Nintendo (Super NES version) Interplay Productions (Enhanced CD Multimedia edition)
- Designer: Will Wright
- Series: SimCity
- Platform: List: Acorn Archimedes, Acorn Electron, Amiga, Amiga CDTV, Amstrad CPC, Atari ST, BBC Micro, Commodore 64, DESQview, EPOC32, FM Towns, IBM PC, iOS, J2ME, Linux, Mac OS, MS-DOS, MSX, OLPC XO-1, OS/2, PC-88, PC-98, Super NES, Unix, Windows, X68000, ZX Spectrum, Palm OS
- Release: February 1989: Mac OS, MS-DOS; NA: February 1989 Amiga; NA: February 1989; EU: September 1989 C64; NA: August 1989 IBM PC; NA: October 1989 FM Towns; JP: March 1990 PC DOS; NA: April 9, 1990 Atari ST; EU: July 1990 ZX Spectrum; EU: August 1990 CPC; EU: January 1991 Super NES; JP: April 26, 1991; NA: August 23, 1991; EU: September 24, 1992 CDTV; EU: 1991 Windows; NA: 1992 iOS; NA: December 18, 2008
- Genre: City-building
- Modes: Single-player, multiplayer

SimCity (also known as the retronyms Micropolis or SimCity Classic) is a city-building simulation video game developed by Will Wright, and released for several platforms from 1989 to 1991. SimCity features two-dimensional graphics and an overhead perspective. The game's objective is to create a city, develop residential and industrial areas, build infrastructure, and collect taxes for further city development. Importance is placed on increasing the population's standard of living, maintaining a balance between the different sectors, and monitoring the region's environmental situations to prevent the settlement from declining and going bankrupt.

SimCity was independently developed by Will Wright, beginning in 1985; the game was not released until 1989. Because the game lacked any arcade or action elements that dominated the video game market in the 1980s, video game publishers declined to release the title for fear of its commercial failure until Broderbund eventually agreed to distribute it. Although the game initially sold poorly, positive feedback from the gaming press boosted its sales. After becoming a best-seller, SimCity was released on several other platforms, most notably on the Super Nintendo Entertainment System (SNES) in 1991. Its gameplay was significantly revised with Nintendo's involvement.

SimCity is regarded as one of the most influential video games of all time, marking the beginning of the urban simulation genre. It was met with critical acclaim for its innovative and addictive gameplay despite the absence of traditional action elements, with reviewers describing it as instructive and beneficial to players’ understanding of urban planning, politics, and economics. SimCity sold 500,000 units on home computers and 1.98 million units on the SNES, and received numerous awards from news publishers and industry associations. The game's success also established publisher Maxis’ tradition of producing non-linear simulation games, one of which—The Sims—would surpass all its predecessors in popularity and become one of the best-selling franchises in the video game industry.

== Gameplay ==
The core concept of SimCity is to build and design a city without specific goals to achieve. The player may divide land into commercial, industrial, or residential zones, add buildings, change the tax rate, build a power grid, build transportation systems and take any other actions to enhance the city. Once able to construct buildings in a particular area, the too-small-to-see residents, known as "Sims", may choose to construct and upgrade houses, apartment blocks, light, heavy industrial buildings, commercial buildings, hospitals, churches, and other structures. The Sims make these choices based on such factors as traffic levels, availability of electrical power, crime levels, and proximity to other types of buildings—for example, residential areas next to a power plant will seldom appreciate the highest grade of housing. In the Super NES version and later, the player can also build rewards when they are given, such as the mayor's mansion or a casino.

The player may face disasters including floods, tornadoes, fires (often from air disasters or shipwrecks), earthquakes and monster attacks. In addition, monsters and tornadoes can trigger train crashes by running into passing trains.

=== Scenarios ===
SimCity features goal-oriented, time-limited scenarios that are contingent on the player's performance and could result in either a win or a loss. The implementation of scenarios was suggested by Broderbund, as a means of transforming SimCity into a more traditional game format. This addition was intended to enhance the overall experience for players, by introducing clearly defined objectives and increasing the level of challenge in the game. In SimCity, the initial cities were modeled after real-world cities and endeavored to replicate their general layout. Although the majority of scenarios featured in the game exist within a fictional timeline or involve a city besieged by an imaginary catastrophe, a select few are based on genuine historical events.

== Development ==
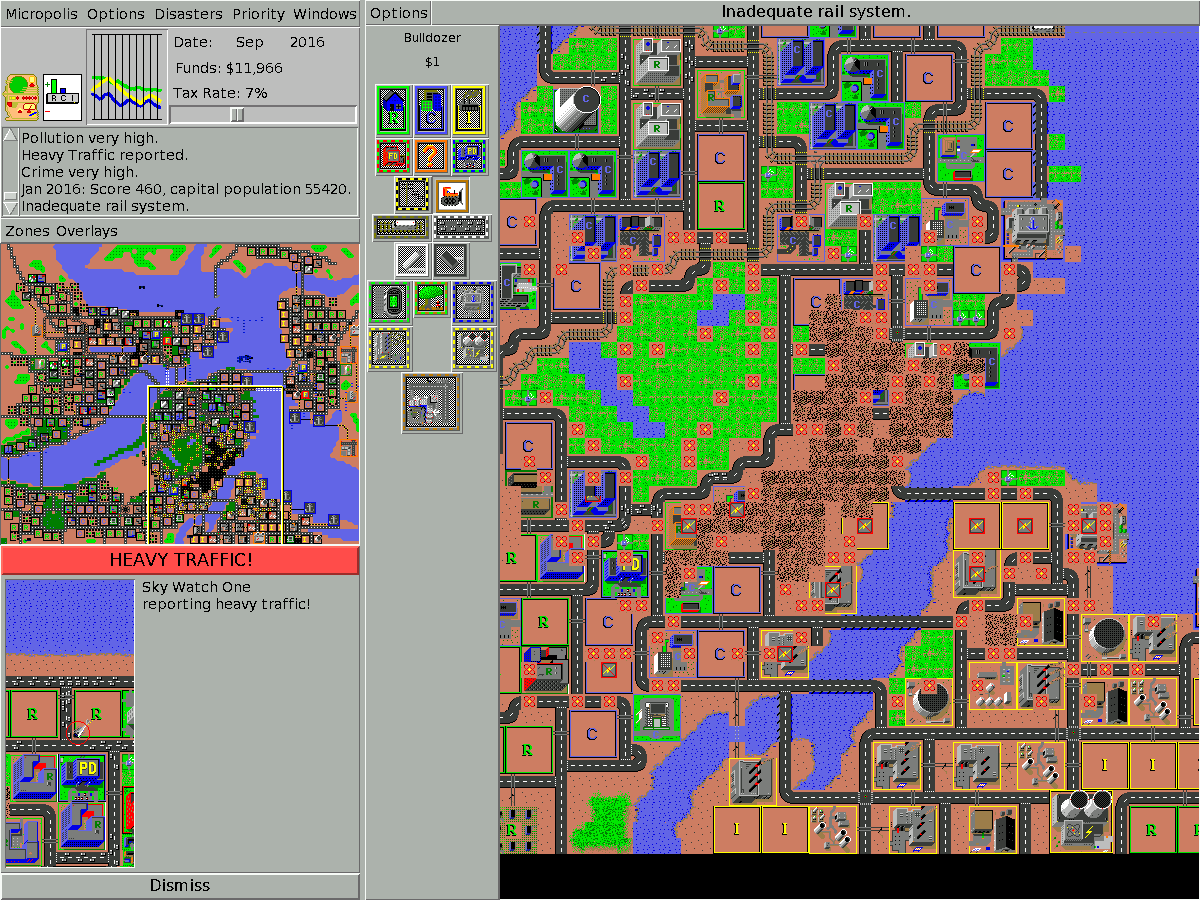
A large developed city in Micropolis version (2007)

SimCity was developed by game designer Will Wright. While working on the game Raid on Bungeling Bay, in which the player flies a helicopter dropping bombs on islands, Wright found he enjoyed designing the islands in the level editor rather than playing the actual game. This led him to develop increasingly sophisticated level editors. At the same time, Wright was cultivating a love of the intricacies and theories of urban planning and acknowledges the influence of System Dynamics which was developed by Jay Wright Forrester and whose book on the subject laid the foundations for what would become SimCity. In addition, Wright also was inspired by reading "The Seventh Sally", a short story from The Cyberiad by Stanisław Lem, in which an engineer encounters a deposed tyrant, and creates a miniature city with artificial citizens for the tyrant to oppress. The game reflected Wright's approval of mass transit and disapproval of nuclear power; Maxis president Jeff Braun stated "We're pushing political agendas".

The first version of the game was developed for the Commodore 64 in 1985; it was not published for another four years. The original working title of SimCity was Micropolis. The game was unusual in that it could neither be won or lost; as a result, game publishers did not believe it was possible to market and sell such a game successfully. Broderbund declined to publish the title when Wright proposed it, and he pitched it to a range of major game publishers without success. Finally, Braun, founder of the tiny software company Maxis, agreed to publish SimCity as one of two initial games for the company.

Wright and Braun returned to Broderbund to formally clear the rights to the game in 1988, when SimCity was near completion. After Broderbund executives Gary Carlston and Don Daglow saw SimCity, they signed Maxis to a distribution deal for both of its initial games. With that, four years after initial development, SimCity was released for the Amiga and Macintosh platforms, followed by the IBM PC and Commodore 64 later in 1989.

== Ports and versions ==
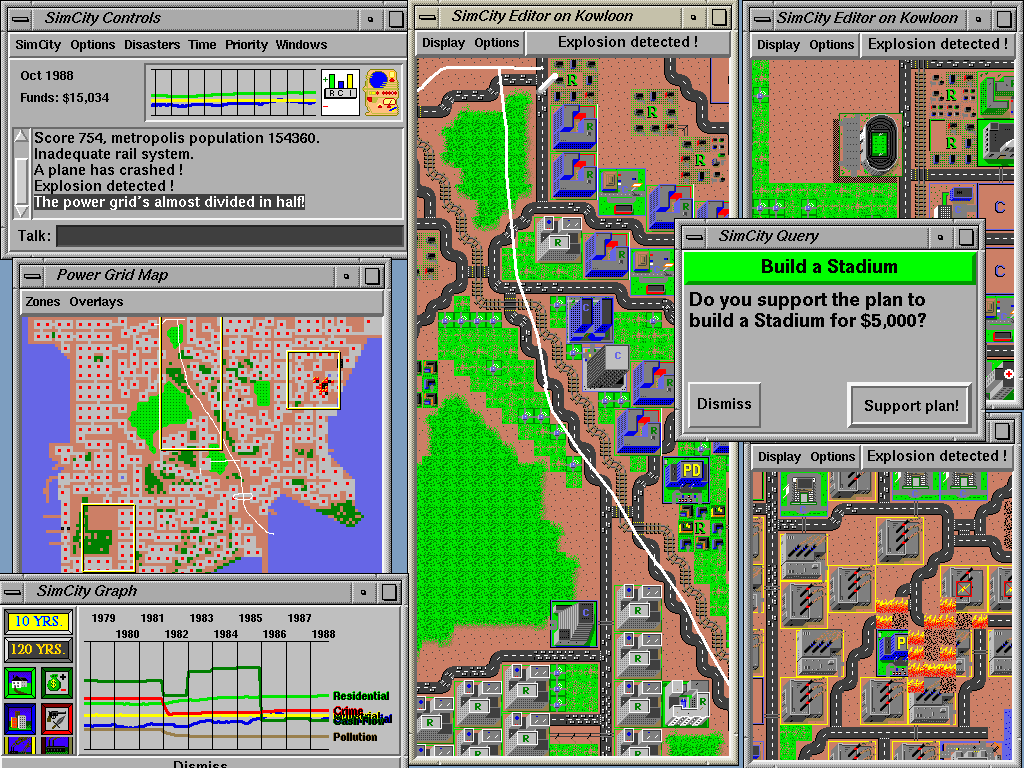
Multiplayer mode on the SGI Indigo workstation

After the original release on the Amiga and Macintosh, the game was released on the Commodore 64 and IBM PC compatibles, and afterward saw more releases for computers and video game consoles: Atari ST, Acorn Archimedes, Amstrad CPC, ZX Spectrum, BBC Micro, Acorn Electron, Super Nintendo Entertainment System, EPOC32, mobile phone, Internet, Windows, FM Towns, OLPC XO-1 and News HyperLook on Sun Unix. The game is available as a multiplayer version for X11 Tcl/Tk on various Unix, Linux, DESQview and OS/2 operating systems.

Shortly after the game's initial release, Maxis released the SimCity Terrain Editor for the original versions of the game, which was sold as a mail-order add-on in North America but gained a standalone retail release in Europe. The Terrain Editor is a simple tool that allows the user to create maps with forest, land, and water portions. In 1990, Maxis developed two "Graphics Sets" packs for the MS-DOS and Amiga versions: "Ancient Cities" and "Future Cities". Each pack contained themed sets which changed the graphics and messages in the game to fit certain themes.

In 1991, an enhanced version of the game was released for Windows 3.0/3.1. It runs in the Windows GDI with new sounds and music, either PC-Speaker type or digital/MIDI type. In 1992, to coincide with other re-releases of their games, Maxis re-released the Windows version of SimCity as "SimCity Classic", which bundled the game with the MS-DOS version of the Terrain Editor. The Graphics Sets were also reissued to run on Windows 3.1 as well. SimCity Classic was re-released in 1993 as part of the SimClassics Volume 1 compilation alongside SimAnt and SimLife for PC, Mac and Amiga. In 1994, a DOS-compatible "SimCity: Enhanced CD-ROM" version was released by Interplay Productions, which included new 256-color graphics and sound, and FMV movies that would trigger events. Then in 1995, Maxis released a Windows 95 compatible version of the game titled "SimCity Deluxe". It also included new 256-color graphics and sound, and bundled the 6 Graphics Sets and an updated Terrain Editor together with the base game. The CD was a Win3.1 / Win95 hybrid, it also included the original 1991 Win3.1 port of the game as well.

=== Super NES ===
The Super Nintendo Entertainment System (SNES) followed a mid-1989 call to Maxis co-founder Jeff Braun from Nintendo expressing interest in porting the game, as Nintendo developer Shigeru Miyamoto was very interested in how the game allowed the player to create their own world. Braun flew to Nintendo of America's headquarters to meet with chairman Howard Lincoln and president Minoru Arakawa. They offered Braun to do all the porting to the Super NES, paying Maxis $1 for every copy sold, and offering Braun a $1 million check for accepting the deal on the spot, which Braun accepted. During this development time, Miyamoto would work alongside Wright to develop means to bring the game to the console.

SimCity for the Super NES features the same gameplay and scenario features; however, since it was developed and published by Nintendo, the company incorporated their own ideas. Instead of the Godzilla monster disaster, Bowser of the Super Mario series becomes the attacking monster, and once the city reaches a landmark 500,000 populace, the player receives a Mario statue that can be placed in the city. The Super NES port also features special buildings the player may receive as rewards, such as casinos, large parks, amusement parks, and expo centers; some of which would be incorporated into SimCity 2000. A bank can be built which will allow a loan of $10,000 to be taken, but it must be paid back before another loan can be taken out. The game includes schools and hospitals, though they cannot be placed by the player; instead, the game will sometimes turn an empty residential lot into one. There are city classifications, such as becoming a metropolis of 100,000 people. It has some of the same pre-set scenarios in the PC and Mac versions and two new ones. One is in Las Vegas under attack by aliens and another is called Freeland. Freeland has no water, and no rewards for buildings are given. Also unique to the Super NES version is a character named "Dr. Wright" (whose physical appearance is based on Will Wright) who acts as an adviser to the player. Dr. Wright was inspired by Miyamoto, at the time known to fans as "Dr. Miyamoto", and Nintendo had come to recognize the value of cartoonist mascots for games, leading to Dr. Wright's creation. The soundtrack was composed by Soyo Oka. The edition is featured as Nintendo's Player's Choice as a million-seller.

In August 1996, a version of the game entitled BS SimCity Machizukuri Taikai was broadcast to Japanese players via the Super Famicom's Satellaview subsystem. Later, a sequel titled SimCity 64 was released for the 64DD, the Japan-only Nintendo 64 add-on.

According to Chaim Gingold, a former Maxis employee, he believes that the time Wright spent with Miyamoto helped to influence the direction of SimCity 2000.

=== Cancelled NES version ===
Gameplay screenshot from the unreleased Nintendo Entertainment System version of SimCity

A version for the Nintendo Entertainment System (NES) was announced alongside the Super NES version and had been showcased at the 1991 Consumer Electronics Show, but the NES version was never properly released. However, prototype cartridges for the NES version were discovered in 2018, and one copy was obtained by video game preservationist Frank Cifaldi, who extensively documented its features compared to the original PC and Super NES versions. It featured a completely different soundtrack (also composed by Oka) from that of the Super NES version; besides Metropolis Theme, a composition that Oka herself considers one of her best works.

=== Micropolis ===
In January 2008, the SimCity source code was released as free software under the GPL-3.0-or-later license, renamed Micropolis (the game's original working title) for trademark reasons, and developed by Don Hopkins. The release of the source code was motivated by the One Laptop Per Child program. The Micropolis source code has been translated to C++, integrated with Python and interfaced with both GTK+ and OpenLaszlo.

In 2008, Maxis established an online browser-based version of SimCity. A second browser-based version was later released under the name Micropolis. In 2013, a browser-based version was released, ported using JavaScript and HTML5, as micropolisJS.

Since Micropolis is licensed under the GPL-3.0-or-later, users can do anything they want with it that conforms with the GPL-3.0-or-later – the only restriction is that they cannot call it "SimCity" (along with a few other limitations to protect EA's trademarks). This allows other, differently named projects to be forked from the Micropolis source code. Improvements to the open-source code base that merit EA's approval may be incorporated into the official "OLPC SimCity" source code, to be distributed with the OLPC under the trademarked name OLPC SimCity, but only after it has been reviewed and approved by EA.

=== Comparison of different versions ===
Detailed information about ports of SimCity Classic
Platform	Version – Release date	Comments
Amiga	V.1.0 –: NA: February 1989	Alongside SimCity for the Macintosh, this was the first commercially released version of SimCity. It ran on any Amiga with at least 512 kilobytes of memory and was distributed on a single floppy disk.
Amiga	V.2.0	This version has been enhanced with the ability to switch tilesets. A tileset consists of all the images the game uses to draw the city, and by changing the tileset one can give the city a different look and feel. The graphics support up to 64 colors in Extra Halfbrite mode. Because of this new functionality, SimCity 2 requires at least 1MB of memory, twice that of the original version.
Amiga CDTV	EU: 1991	To make the game more pleasant to play when viewed on a distant television, this version of the game shows a closer view of the city. Other changes include a user interface more suited for use from the CDTV's remote control, use CD-DA for music, and the addition of three scenarios.
Amstrad CPC	V.1.0 –: EU: 1990; Sim City Amstrad CPC	
Atari ST	V.1.0 –: EU: July 1990; Sim City Atari ST	This version features scenarios but has no music and the game's graphics are less colorful than the graphics of the Amiga version 2.0.
BBC Micro Acorn Electron	V.1.0 –: UK: 1990	This version lacks music, many sound effects, most animation and has limited colour palettes, but has most of the features of the Amiga version, in spite of having to run in 25KB of memory.
Commodore 64	V.1.0 –: NA: 1989	This version lacks police/fire stations, stadiums and railways. Disasters are limited to earthquakes. It also forgoes the stat screen useful for evaluating the city's development. The player can select between eight scenarios or on randomly generated terrain.
Macintosh	V.1.0 –: NA: February 1989	Released in two versions: monochrome and color. Copy-protection 'red-sheet' with symbols that is queried at game start. Repackaged edition released in 1991 with the cover printed on the game box (without sleeve over the box).
Macintosh	V.1.1: NA: 1989	Copy protection removed.
Macintosh	Macintosh - Classic –: NA: 1996	Windows and Macintosh CD-ROM version released as part of Collector's series. Supports System 6.0.2 and System 7.
PC	MS-DOS – 1.00 ~ 1.07: NA: 1989	Features EGA color graphics in both low-resolution 320x200 and high-resolution 640x350, as well as monochrome EGA 640x350, CGA 640x200, and Hercules 720x348. v1.07 added MCGA 640x480 mono. Limited sound effects through the PC speaker, Tandy DAC, or rare Covox SoundMaster. Has a copy-protection 'red-sheet' with symbols that is queried at game start. Capable of running on an IBM PC 5150 with 512KB RAM and ONE 5-1/4" floppy drive (no hard drive required).
PC	MS-DOS - Classic – v2.00: NA: 1992	Re-released for MS-DOS as version 2.00. Copyright protection was removed and added support for VGA 640x480 in color, and a special VGA/MCGA 320x200 in 256 color mode. Dropped Covox sound support and added standard SoundBlaster digital sound and MIDI background music. Terrain Editor is now integrated right into the main program interface, and can switch back and forth with a single key-stroke. Addons: New standalone Terrain Editor for DOS and 6 graphics sets.
PC	Windows - Classic –: NA: 1992	Released for Windows 3.1 with new sounds and music, either PC-Speaker type or digital/MIDI type. The interface has floating toolbars, and bookmarks to save positions of note in the city to return to later. The PC Speaker sounds and music are quite innovative, the music is based on a Bach violin solo. The simulator engine appears to have a few subtle differences, such as hi-value residential zones that stay as small houses in the DOS versions, when loaded into the Windows version instantly turn into hi-value hi-rises. Terrain Editor for DOS included. Addons are the 6 graphics sets.
PC	Enhanced CD-ROM – (Interplay): NA: 1994	Released by Interplay Productions for MS-DOS, it featured 256-color graphics, new music and sound effects and added FMV movie cutscenes and news reports.
PC	Deluxe CD-ROM – (Maxis): NA: 1995	SimCity Deluxe CD-ROM - Re-released in 1995 for Windows 95 with new 256-color graphics and sound, all 6 graphics sets, and new Terrain Editor. Works in Win XP and Win 7.
Super NES	JP: April 26, 1991; NA: August 1991; EU: September 24, 1992	Developed and Published by Nintendo under license by Maxis, the Super NES version of SimCity had additional features not found in the original SimCity, including graphics changing to match the seasons (trees are green in summer, turn rusty brown in the fall, white in the winter, and bloom as cherry blossoms in the spring), civic reward buildings, and a very energetic green-haired city advisor named Dr. Wright (after Will Wright), who would often pop up and inform the player of problems with their city. In addition, the Super NES version of SimCity had two additional bonus scenarios, accessible when the original scenarios were completed: Las Vegas and Freeland (see the section on scenarios). The style of the buildings also resembles those in Japan rather than those of North America. A Nintendo Entertainment System port was also planned but was cancelled. Nintendo also put their stamp on the game, with a dangerous disaster being Bowser attack on a city (in place of a generic movie-type monster), and a Mario statue awarded once the megalopolis level of 500,000 inhabitants is reached. The Super NES version of SimCity has been released for the Wii's Virtual Console service (No longer available as of January 2, 2013).
ZX Spectrum	V.1.0 – 1989	Has all the features (such as scenarios, crime, and disasters) of later versions of the game, but with much more limited sound and graphics.

- SimCity Classic is available for Palm OS and on the SimCity.com website as Classic Live. It was also released by Atelier Software for the Psion 5 handheld computer, and mobile phones in 2006.
- Additionally a terrain editor and architecture disks were available with tileset graphics for settings of Ancient Asia, Medieval, Wild West, Future Europe, Future USA and a Moon Colony.
- Versions of SimCity for the BBC Micro, Acorn Electron, and Acorn Archimedes computers were published by Superior Software/Acornsoft. Programmer Peter Scott had to squeeze the 512k Amiga version of the game into 25 KB to run on the aging 32 KB BBC Micro and Acorn Electron. Despite this, it kept almost all of the functionality of the Amiga game and very similar graphics (although only using four colors).
- DUX Software published a Unix version of SimCity for the NeWS window system using the HyperLook user interface environment, and a multiplayer version of SimCity for the X11 window system using the Tcl/Tk user interface toolkit, both developed and ported to various platforms by Don Hopkins.

== Reception ==
Reception

Review scores
Publication	Score
AllGame	5/5 (PC); 4.5/5 (Macintosh)
Electronic Gaming Monthly	7/10, 9/10, 8/10, 6/10 (SNES)
Famitsu	9/10, 8/10, 9/10, 7/10 (SFC)
Mean Machines	94% (SNES)

SimCity was a financial success, selling one million copies by late 1992, including 500,000 for home computers and another 500,000 for the SNES. In the United States, it was the ninth best-selling computer game from 1993 to 1999, with another 830,000 units sold. The SNES version sold 1.98 million units worldwide, including 900,000 units in Japan. It was critically acclaimed and received significant recognition within a year after its initial release. As of December 1990, the game was reported to have won the following awards:

Critics' Choice: Best Consumer Program, 1989, Software Publisher's Association.; Most Innovative Publisher, 1989, Computer Game Developer's Conference.; Member of the 1989 Game Hall of Fame, Macworld.; Game of the Year, 1989., Computer Gaming World.; Fourth Best Simulation of All Time for Amiga, .info.; Editors' Choice Award: Best Simulation, 1989, Compute.; Editors' Choice Award: Best Recreation Program, 1989, MacUser.; Best Curricular Program, Codie award.; Best Consumer Program, Critic's Choice Award.	Best Computer Strategy Game, 1989, Video Games & Computer Entertainment.; Best Game Designer of the Year: Will Wright, for SimCity, 1989, Computer Entertainer.; Best 20th Century Computer Game, 1989, Charles S. Roberts Award.; Software Award of Excellence, 1990–1991, Technology and Learning.; Best Educational Program, 1990, European Computer Leisure Award.; Tilt D'Or (Golden Award): Most Original Game, 1989, Tilt (France).; Game of the Year, 1989, Amiga Annual (Australia).; World Class Award, 1990, Macworld Australia.; 4th best game of all time, Amiga Power.

In addition, SimCity won the Origins Award for "Best Military or Strategy Computer Game" of 1989 in 1990, was named to Computer Gaming World's Hall of Fame for games readers highly rated over time, and the multiplayer X11 version of the game was also nominated in 1992 as the Best Product of the Year in Unix World. Macworld named the Macintosh version of SimCity the Best Simulation Game of 1989, putting it into the Macintosh Game Hall of Fame. Macworld, in their review, praised its graphics as well as its strategic gameplay, calling it "A challenging, dynamic game, realistic and unpredictable", and notes how "as the population grows the city's needs change." SimCity was named No. 4 "Ten Greatest PC Game Ever" by PC World in 2009. It was named one of the sixteen most influential games in history at Telespiel, a German technology and games trade show, in 2007. Sid Meier in 2008 named SimCity as one of the three most important innovations in videogame history, as it led to other games that encouraged players to create, not destroy. It was named No. 11 on IGN's 2009 "Top 25 PC Games of All Time" list. In 1996, Computer Gaming World declared SimCity the 6th-best computer game ever released. In 2018, Complex rated SimCity 50th on its "The Best Super Nintendo Games of All Time." In 1995, Total! listed SimCity 89th on their "Top 100 SNES Games." IGN ranked the game 35th in its "Top 100 SNES Games of All Time."

Mike Siggins reviewed SimCity for Games International magazine, and gave it 5 stars out of 5, and stated that "Overall, SimCity must be ranked right up there in the all-time Amiga classics. It is the first title that I have come across to turn a 'serious' theme into a passable simulation while also making for an excellent game." Macworld called SimCity "an intricate and intriguing game".

Entertainment Weekly gave the game a B+.

Johnny L. Wilson reviewed the game for Computer Gaming World, and stated that "Dynamic is exactly the right word for this product. There is constant strategy involved in the placement of zones, road building, political decision-making, and damage control."

In 1991, PC Format named SimCity one of the 50 best computer games ever. The editors called it "a town planner's dream".

The University of Southern California and University of Arizona used SimCity in urban planning and political science classes. Chuck Moss of The Detroit News found that Godzilla attacking the city in the 1972 Detroit scenario caused less destruction than the mayoralty of Coleman Young. In 1990 The Providence Journal invited five candidates for Mayor of Providence, Rhode Island to manage a SimCity town resembling the city. Victoria Lederberg blamed her close loss in the Democratic primary on the newspaper's description of her poor performance in the game; former mayor Buddy Cianci, the most successful player, won the election that year.

The SimCity Terrain Editor was reviewed in 1989 in Dragon No. 147 by Hartley, Patricia, and Kirk Lesser in "The Role of Computers" column. The reviewers gave the expansion 4 out of 5 stars.

The ZX Spectrum version was voted number 4 in the Your Sinclair Readers' Top 100 Games of All Time.

In 2004, SimCity was inducted into GameSpot's list of the greatest games of all time.

On March 12, 2007, The New York Times reported that SimCity was named to a list of the ten most important video games of all time, the so-called game canon. The Library of Congress took up a video game preservation proposal and began with the games from this list, including SimCity.

== Legacy ==
SimCity yielded several sequels. "Sim" games of many types were developed – with Will Wright and Maxis developing myriad titles including SimEarth, SimFarm, SimTown, Streets of SimCity, SimCopter, SimAnt, SimLife, SimIsle, SimTower, SimPark, SimSafari, and The Sims, which spawned its own series, as well as the unreleased SimsVille and SimMars. They also obtained licenses for some titles developed in Japan, such as SimTower and Let's Take The A-Train (released as A-Train outside Japan). Spore, released in 2008, was originally going to be titled "SimEverything" – a name that Will Wright thought might accurately describe what he was trying to achieve.

SimCity inspired a new genre of video games. "Software toys" that were open-ended with no set objective were developed trying to duplicate SimCity's success. The most successful was Wright's own The Sims, which went on to be the best selling computer game of all time. The ideas pioneered in SimCity have been incorporated into real-world applications as well, as urban developers have recognized that the game's design was "gamification" of city planning by integrating numerous real-world systems for a city or region interacted to project growth or change. For example, VisitorVille simulates a city based on website statistics. Several real-world city improvement projects started with models inspired by SimCity prior to implementation, particularly with the onset of more connected smart cities.

The series also spawned a SimCity collectible card game, produced by Mayfair Games. Rick Swan reviewed SimCity: The Card Game for Dragon magazine No. 221 (September 1995). Swan says that "While the card game doesn't scale the heights of the computer game, it comes close."

Dr. Wright from the Super NES version has made appearances in several video games. He is a non-player character in The Legend of Zelda: Link's Awakening, and an assist trophy in the Super Smash Bros. series.

== See also ==
- Government simulation
- Municipal government, the basis for SimCity
- Urban planning
- Regional planning
- List of open source games
