= SkyChase =

1988 video game

- North American cover art
- Developer: Maxis
- Publishers: NA: Broderbund; EU: Image Works
- Producer: Jeff Braun
- Designer: Ralph Russell
- Programmer: Ralph Russell
- Artist: Don Bayless
- Platforms: Amiga, Atari ST, MS-DOS
- Release: 1988: Amiga, ST; 1990: MS-DOS
- Genre: Combat flight simulator
- Modes: Single-player, multiplayer

SkyChase is a combat flight simulator designed by Ralph Russell and published in 1988. It is the first game developed by Maxis.

== Gameplay ==
SkyChase is an arcadey combat flight simulator often compared to Top Gun by Ocean Software.

== Reception ==
Reception

Review scores
Publication	Score
Aktueller Software Markt	26/50
Amiga Computing	65%
Computer and Video Games	3/10
Commodore User	5/10
Zzap!64	78%

Julian Rignall of Computer and Video Games compared the game negatively to other flight simulators of the time: "Although Sky Chase has an impressive front end, the game itself is very simplistic, and plays similarly to Ocean's failed Top Gun Licence; it pales in comparison with Cascade's Ace II. There's little difference between the planes, and the gameplay is very repetitive."

Gary Whitta of Commodore User summarized: "[...] I would only advise you to consider buying Skychase if you have a chum to play it with. The computer mode is boring, too easy, and ultimately a drag to play."

Zzap!64 concluded that the game is "An exhilarating flying game - at its best with two players at the controls."
