= Mindwarp (disambiguation) =

Mindwarp is a Doctor Who serial.

Mindwarp may also refer to:

- Mindwarp (novel), a novel by James Follett
- Earthsearch Mindwarp, a radio series based on the Follett novel
- Zodiac Mindwarp and the Love Reaction, an English hard rock band of the 1980s
- Mindwarp (film) a 1992 film
- Mindwarp, a character from the DC Comics series Secret Seven
- The Mindwarp, a cancelled video game by Maxis
