= Sim City: The Card Game =

Collectible card game

- Card back of SimCity the Card Game
- Origin: SimCity
- Type: Collectible card game
- Players: 1+
- Age range: 10 and up
- Chance: Medium

Related games
- SimCity series, Sim series

Sim City: The Card Game is an out-of-print collectible card game based on the video game SimCity by Maxis. The goal of the game is to build a city from the ground up. Players take turns playing cards representing city blocks and collect profit.

== Publication history ==
The original game was released in 1995 by Mayfair Games and contained 517 cards (363 standard size, 154 long) sold in 60-card starter decks and 15-card booster packs. The starter decks consisted of 5 rare cards, 19 uncommon cards, and 36 common cards, and booster packs consisted of 1 ultra-rare card, 1 rare card, 5 uncommon cards, and 8 common cards. Boxes contained 12 starter decks or 32 booster packs. The long cards are almost twice the width of standard cards and are all ultra-rare.

Several city fixed-deck expansion sets followed, adding location and politician cards from various cities, including Chicago, Washington (March 1996), New York City (May 1996), and Atlanta. Several expansions were planned but never released including Hollywood, Paris, Toronto and Denver. Eleven different promo packs were also released with 10 fixed cards each. Some of these promo packs included the promos that appeared as magazine inserts. Another source noted over 150 promo cards, some released to conventions and gaming stores. One promo was only available from Combo magazine and featured a picture of the Combo offices.

Darwin Bromley, the president and founder of Mayfair Games at the time, appeared as a "Mayor" card in the game. Bromley was also the conceptual designer behind the game.

== Gameplay ==
The object of the game is to build a municipality through four phases: settlement, town, city, and metropolis. The game progresses as both a cooperative game and a competitive game. Each card has a value and a zone associated with it, the latter indicated by the color on the title box. The seven zones are Agricultural, City Services, Commercial, Government, Industrial, Residential, and Special.

In the settlement phase, the majority of cards played will consist of undeveloped land and residential zone cards. The town phase increases the number of playable zones, and the city phase allows all zones. The metropolis phase is the only one to permit the special long cards.

The first player to play a power plant at the end of the second phase becomes mayor and automatically receives a tie-breaking vote for the city council. Other players may become city councillors by playing a city council member card in the third or fourth phases of the game. The city council accepts or declines rezoning requests from any players. Any played card may be upgraded by playing another card of higher value from the same zoning group atop it, or may be rezoned for special long cards.

A player earns bucks, the point system of the game, as indicated on each card played, and may earn bonus points based on its placement and surrounding cards. Laying cards next to others of the same zone earns a number of bonus points equal to the number of neighboring cards of the same zone. A complex bonus may also be awarded based on the specific type of location instead of a zone. Some cards award a negative bonus, such as a landfill adjacent to a residential zone. A disaster card may disrupt some part of the game, some necessitating the mayor to pay bucks to protect the city. The first player to earn 250 bucks wins the game.

== Reception ==
Rick Swan reviewed Sim City: The Card Game for Dragon magazine #221 (September 1995). Swan says that "While the card game doesn't scale the heights of the computer game, it comes close." Swan concluded his review by saying "Sim City looks like a winner." The game was based on a solitaire computer game and was noted as one of the "lowest-conflict" collectible card games at that time. The aim of each player is to add to their own city and the only "attack" cards were natural disasters.

Scott Haring reviewed Sim City: The Card Game for Pyramid magazine and stated that "The game starts simply and gets more complex with time, making it perfect for people who don't usually play trading card games, or even strategy games in general. If you don't have to win at all costs and stab everyone in the back to have a good time, you and your friends will enjoy Sim City: The Card Game."
