= SimGolf =

1996 golf video game

- Developer: Tavex
- Publisher: Maxis
- Designer: Vladimir Vinetsky
- Programmers: Olexander Bilyk; Oleg Mouraveinick; Serg Butenko; Vasyl Tsvirkunov
- Artists: Sharon Barr; Shannon Galvin
- Composer: Jerry Martin
- Series: Sim
- Platform: Windows
- Release: November 15, 1996
- Genre: Golf
- Modes: Single-player, multiplayer

SimGolf is a golf video game created by Maxis in 1996. The game allows players to design their own golf courses and play them.

== Gameplay ==
The player can design their own golf course, being able to lower and raising the terrain, and can add trees, traps, lakes and other natural hazards.

Players can play on the golf course they have designed or play the two existing courses designed by American golf course architect Robert Trent Jones Jr.

The MouseSwing interface lets the player use their mouse to hit the ball, and leaves the driving, chipping and putting to the player. (The traditional "power bar" option is also available.)

== Reception ==
The game received a score of 2 out of 5 stars from Peter Smith of Computer Games Strategy Plus, with criticism going toward the graphics and physics. Barry Brenesal of Gamecenter rated it 8 out of 10, offering praise for the graphics and audio. Nick Smith of AllGame rated it 4 out of 5 stars, praising the course designer and MouseSwing.

== See also ==
- List of golf video games
- List of Maxis games
