= Jerry Martin (composer) =

American composer

- Origin: United States
- Genres: Jazz; video game
- Occupation: Composer
- Instruments: Guitar; keyboards
- Years active: 1985–present
- Website: https://jerrymartinmusic.com/

Jerry Martin is an American composer, best known for his work composing music (particularly jazz) for television commercials, and being the lead composer for several games in The Sims franchise, including SimCity 3000, The Sims, The Sims Bustin' Out, The Sims 2 and SimCity 4. He made a return in 2020 with SimCasino.

== Early life and education ==
Martin began taking music lessons at the age of 10 and played guitar and keyboards in various ensembles through his high school and college education. Martin received his Bachelor of Arts degree in music composition from California State University, Hayward and a Master of Fine Arts from the Center for Contemporary Music at Mills College.

== Career ==
In 1985, he founded his original music composition and production company called "Musicontrol". From 1985 to 1995, Martin composed and produced music for various projects such as video soundtracks to national TV and radio commercials, working with over 90 individual film, video and ad agency producers on over 200 different commissions from companies such as AT&T, Toyota, the NBA, Honda, and others. In 1996, Martin joined the Maxis division of Electronic Arts as studio audio director and Lead Composer. From 1996 through 2004, he composed and produced music and directed the audio for multi-platinum video game franchises such as The Sims and SimCity.

In 2005, Martin started his new company, Jerry Martin Music, and is currently working on various professional and personal musical projects.

== Works ==
=== Video game soundtracks ===
- The Sims
- The Sims Livin' Large
- The Sims House Party
- The Sims Hot Date
- The Sims Vacation
- The Sims Unleashed
- The Sims Superstar
- The Sims Makin' Magic
- The Sims Bustin' Out
- The Sims Online
- The Sims 2
- SimCity 3000
- SimCity 3000 Unlimited
- SimCity 4
- SimCity 4 Rush Hour
- SimCopter
- SimTunes
- SimPark
- SimSafari
- SimGolf
- Streets of SimCity
- Supercross 2000
- Tony La Russa Baseball
- SimCasino
- Tromi

=== Companies whose TV commercials feature Martin's compositions ===
- AT&T Communications
- Acer Corporation
- Alamo Car Rental
- Apple
- Avocet
- Buick Dealers Association
- Cost Plus Imports
- Electronic Arts
- Emporium
- GMC Trucks Dealers Association
- Gallo Salame
- Grass Valley Group
- Growing Healthy Inc.
- Hilltop Shopping Center
- Hitachi Data Systems
- Honda Dealers Association
- KTVU Channel 2
- Landor Associates
- Longs Drug Stores
- Lucky Stores
- NBA
- Nationwide Marketing
- Olympic Stain
- Pacific Bell
- Philip Morris
- Primerica
- Project Open Hand
- RSCVA
- Raychem Corporation
- Quantum
- Rolm
- Safeway Eastern Division
- Sierra Pacific Power
- Southern Pacific
- Sun Microsystems
- SYVA
- Suzuki USA
- Toyota
- Toyota USA
- Toyota Dealers Association
- Weinstock's
- Wells Fargo Bank
- Wesson Oil
- Yamaha USA
