= The Crystal Skull (video game) =

1996 video game

- Developer: Some Interactive
- Publisher: Maxis
- Platforms: Windows, Macintosh
- Release: October 1996
- Genre: Adventure
- Mode: Single-player

The Crystal Skull is a 1996 video game developed by Some Interactive and published by Maxis for Microsoft Windows and Macintosh. It is an adventure video game in which players are an Aztec tasked by the Emperor, Moctezuma II, to find the titular and mystical crystal skull. Edward James Olmos appears in-game as The Shaman, a character that offers assistance and hints to players. Upon release, The Crystal Skull received negative reviews, with critics partially enjoying the game's premise, visuals, and hints system, but faulting its gameplay as tedious and slow-paced, and its dialog and performances as poorly-written and anachronistic for its intended historical theme.

== Gameplay ==
The Crystal Skull merges scenery with full motion video, as depicted by Edward James Olmos as The Shaman.

The Crystal Skull is an adventure game played in third-person perspective in which characters are displayed in full motion video. Players move the mouse cursor to point and click to interact at objects of interest, with the cursor changing shape to an arrow to move players, an eye to look at objects, a speech bubble to talk to people, and a hand for picking up and manipulating items. When players interact with other characters, dialog options are represented by boxes at the bottom of the screen; moving the cursor over each box summarises in voice what the player character wishes to say. An inventory allows players to select items carried and use the cursor to click on where the player wants to use the item. Many puzzles are based on exchanging objects with characters to progress. An option to automatically revive the player when encountering hazards instead of causing a game over can be selected at the start of the game.

Players also can choose an option at the start of the game to activate a mode where the Shaman, played by Edward James Olmos, directs the player through a series of hints and answers to puzzles in a menu. Clues offered by the Shaman, often about a specific problem or puzzle, are offered in groups of three, with answers becoming progressively more detailed, and the third revealing the answer. The Shaman also provides additional assistance in both game modes by providing players with abilities including a map to transport instantly across visited areas. The game also features a menu with educational information about Aztec and Mayan culture.

== Plot ==
Players assume the role of Quetzal, an Aztec birdkeeper working in the aviary of the royal zoo. He is summoned by the Emperor, Moctezuma II, after receiving bad omens and seeing Quetzal frequently in his dreams. The Emperor's advisor, Snake Skirt, plotting to overthrow the Emperor, instead orders his guards to kill Quetzal. Upon evading the guards and receiving the audience of Moctezuma, the Emperor tasks him with finding the mythical crystal skull as he senses it may hold the key to the future of the kingdom. Quetzal explores jungles, deserts, islands, and temples to find the mythical skull. The game progresses with Quetzal using time travel to ancient times, and ends with he and his girlfriend travelling to modern-day Mexico.

== Development ==
The Crystal Skull was the entry of publisher Maxis into the adventure video game genre, and was developed by Some Interactive, who had previously developed Wrath of the Gods. The game's full motion video sequences were made using Macromedia Director, and featured a cast of fifty actors, including Edward James Olmos as The Shaman.

== Reception ==
Reception

Review scores
Publication	Score
AllGame	2/5
GameSpot	5.6/10
PC Gamer (US)	33%
Gamecenter	2/5
PC Joker	62%

The Crystal Skull received negative reviews upon release, with several expressing that the game was a disappointment from the pedigree of publisher Maxis. The graphics of The Crystal Skull were generally praised for their detail and authenticity. The Oregonian also felt the integration of full motion video with the game's scenery was "stylish yet state-of-the-art", and the Tampa Tribune found the backgrounds "nicely rendered".

Critics faulted the game's writing and performances, and felt its reliance on full motion video added little. Stating that The Crystal Skull "isn't particularly compelling", the Oakland Tribune expressed a dislike of its "bad acting" and "stilted plot" of its full motion video sequences. Several critics felt the performances were anachronistic, with Computer Gaming World felt that the historical theme of the game was "completely destroyed" by its humour and contemporary pop culture references, and critiqued its narrative as inconsequential. Similarly PC Gamer stated the dialog was "childishly-written", had "ludicrous" dialog responses and was "filled with twentieth-Century phrases". Whilst GameSpot agreed the game's performances were "mindless" and its content "sparse on true Aztec culture", but praised the performances as "actually well-done".

Several reviewers found the gameplay and puzzles were tedious and slow-paced. Describing The Crystal Skull as "agonizingly slow", GameCenter found the gameplay boring and puzzles tedious, inadequately explaining the role of the protagonist, requiring completion of an "exhausting chain of events" to progress, and involving unexpected and unavoidable hazards that could end the game. Allgame expressed that the gameplay and its point and click interactions were repetitive due to the amount of dialogue, and that the Shaman feature was necessary to avoid the slow pace and backtracking in the gameplay. Computer Gaming World faulted the puzzles as logically inconsistent and adding little to the gameplay. Whilst GameSpot felt the game lacked puzzles and was slow-paced, the site praised the game for not being completely linear and featuring a hints system as a "refreshing change" from other adventure titles.
