= SimLife =

1992 video game

SimLife: The Genetic Playground
- Cover art featuring different hybrid creatures
- Developer: Maxis
- Publisher: Maxis
- Producer: Jim Siefert
- Designer: Ken Karakotsios
- Programmers: Daniel Goldman; Rodney Lai
- Artists: Jenny Martin; Bonnie Borucki
- Composer: Russell Lieblich
- Series: Sim
- Platforms: Mac OS, MS-DOS, Windows, Amiga
- Release: 1992; 1993 (Amiga)
- Genre: Life simulation
- Mode: Single-player

SimLife: The Genetic Playground is a video game produced by Maxis in 1992. The concept of the game is to simulate an ecosystem; players may modify the genetics of the plants and animals that inhabit the virtual world. The point of this game is to experiment and create a self-sustaining ecosystem. SimLife was re-released in 1993 as part of the SimClassics Volume 1 compilation, alongside SimCity Classic and SimAnt for PC, Mac and Amiga.

== Development ==
SimLife running on Windows Vista

The producers of SimLife refer to it as "The Genetic Playground". The game allows users to explore the interaction of life-forms and environments. Users can manipulate the genetics of both plants and animals to determine whether these new species could survive in the Earth's various environments. Players can also create new worlds with distinctive environments to see how certain species (earth's species or their own) fare within them.

SimLife gives players the power to:

- Create and modify worlds.
- Create and modify plants and animals at the genetic level. Exclusive animals appearing in this game are the Killer Penguin, the Monkeyphant, and the Orgot.
- Design environments and ecosystems.
- Study genetics in action.
- Simulate and control evolution.
- Change the physics of the universe in your computer.

== Reception ==
Computer Gaming World in 1993 praised SimLife, stating that "By neatly bridging the gap between entertainment and education, SL brings the engrossing science of genetics within reach of any interested person". Games Finder gave SimLife a score of 7 out of 10.

In 1993, SimLife received a Codie award from the Software Publishers Association for Best Simulation.

== See also ==
- Spore
- Impossible Creatures
- L.O.L.: Lack of Love
- Evolution: The Game of Intelligent Life
- E.V.O.: Search for Eden
- Creatures
- SimEarth
- Unnatural Selection (video game)
