= SimTown =

1995 video game

- Developer: Maxis
- Publisher: Maxis
- Producer: Claire Curtin
- Designer: Aurora Design
- Programmers: John Lewis; Daniel Browning
- Artist: Jenny Martin
- Composer: Joey Edelman
- Series: Sim
- Platforms: Mac OS, Windows, OS/2 Warp 4, Super Famicom
- Release: 1995
- Genre: City-building
- Mode: Single-player

SimTown is a 1995 video game published by Maxis, much like the best-selling SimCity but on a smaller scale. SimTown allows the player to construct a town consisting of streets, houses, businesses and parks and then control the people in it. SimTown is one of the many "Sim" spin-offs from SimCity, and was targeted more towards children. The Macintosh version was released in May 1995.

The Super Famicom version of SimTown is titled SimCity Jr. (シムシティJr.) and was published by Imagineer exclusively in Japan.

== Gameplay ==
Building a town in the game

The game structure of SimTown is similar to SimCity, but on a generally smaller and simplified scale, in which players are instead tasked with crafting a small town. Players are allocated a blank and flat tract of land, where they will be required to place homes, workplaces, and civic buildings. In addition, other elements such as roads and flora can be placed, although they have no practical use beyond beautification, and consume water resources.

The primary objective of SimTown is to keep the town's citizens happy. This can be achieved by ensuring that water supply, trees, farm crops, and the recycling/air quality program remain well maintained and well funded, with the allocation of "credits" given at each stint. The amount of these resources required for the town and the credits awarded will depend on how much has been built in the town. Trees and ponds, for example, may consume a certain amount of water, while most businesses and homes will generate garbage that must be dealt with using the recycling program. If these resources are not kept in check, the town may experience negative repercussions, such as the presence of dying trees and dried-up ponds if a water supply is not sufficiently provided. This aspect of the game may be compared with the annual or monthly budgets seen in SimCity; however, there are no signs of actual currency used in SimTown aside from the credits allocated for the external resources; there is no monetary cost associated with landscaping or the construction of buildings.

Like SimCity, SimTown places an emphasis on ensuring that a balance between the number of residents and jobs is adequately regulated and maintained. Each household in a home contains two children, a pet, and two adults; the latter may need to find jobs in businesses or civic buildings placed by players. Likewise, businesses and civic buildings require a sufficient number of workers to function properly. If residents are unable to find jobs after a while, indications of their long-term unemployment will show when their home rots and is eventually reduced to rubble (and its inhabitants move out). Similarly, if a business or civic building lacks sufficient employees, the buildings will decay and eventually collapse into rubble.

SimTown allows a player to monitor the town's condition with a feature that allows players to craft and name a resident, who will provide basic feedback and daily activities through diary entries. A local newspaper is also provided to monitor the general conditions of the town. SimTown also awards players with trophies and prize ribbons by meeting certain objectives and requirements. There are also several easter eggs hidden in the game.

== Development ==
SimTown was one of several Sim spin-off titles developed by Maxis made to capitalise on the success of the SimCity series, and was developed as one of two titles in a new lineup of educational software targeted to children, alongside Widget Workshop. It followed the studio taking over distribution of its titles after having previously used Broderbund and Davidson to publish and market its products. Design was led by Claire Curtin, who had previously been hired by Broderbund to tailor the design of SimCity, SimEarth and SimAnt for the education market. The game was announced and showcased at the Consumer Electronics Show in 1994.

== Reception ==
=== Sales ===
In its Form 10-K annual report for the fiscal year to March 1996, Maxis stated SimTown was the best-selling product in its learning products line, a category that grew from 11 to 18 per cent over the previous year.

=== Critical reviews ===
Reception

Review scores
Publication	Score
AllGame	4/5
Hyper	75%
Next Generation	1/5
PC Gamer (US)	76%
CD-ROM Today	3/5
Electronic Games	B+
Mac User	3.5/5
PC Games Magazine UK	76%

SimTown received generally positive reviews from critics. The game was considered as accessible and educational for children, with some critics also describing it as educational and an introduction to resource management and city building game mechanics. PC Gamer viewed the game as easy to learn, featuring houses and attractions that were appealing to children and would help them express their creativity. PC Games UK found the game's interface was designed in a helpful and easy way for children to understand. However, some critics viewed elements of gameplay as cumbersome, with CD-ROM Today describing placing paths as "frustrating" and removing rubble as "tedious".

The visual presentation was generally praised. Next Generation considered the graphics SimTown conformed to a "usual high standard" of Maxis titles, and PC Games UK praised the variety and "enchanting" level of detail of buildings and their interiors. Some highlighted the inclusion of personalisation features for individual characters, with PC Games UK writing that it gave players a level of interaction not shared by earlier Sim titles.

Reviewers considered the content and gameplay options of SimTown was limited. Next Generation found the game to be "boring and repetitive" due to a lack of building options, and PC Gamer felt once players had added available houses, there was little to do or accomplish. PC Games UK also noted that whilst the game was "fun at first" for adults, it was too easy compared to SimCity and unlikely to sustain long-term interest. Several reviewers experienced performance issues and found the game slow to play on older systems.

=== Retrospective reception ===
Several critics have identified the design of SimTown was an early influence on the design of the 1999 Maxis video game The Sims, with media professor Tanja Sihvonen describing it as an "important precursor", and Game Informer writing that it "almost plays like a prototype" of The Sims due to its management of neighborhoods and people.
