= SimFarm =

1993 video game

SimFarm: SimCity's Country Cousin
- Developer: Maxis
- Publisher: Maxis
- Producer: Mike Perry
- Designer: Eric Albers
- Programmer: Eric Albers
- Artist: Jenny Martin
- Composer: Sue Kasper
- Series: Sim
- Platforms: MS-DOS, Macintosh, PC-98, FM Towns, Windows
- Release: MS-DOS; 1993; Macintosh; 1994; PC-98; 1994; FM Towns; 1994; Windows 95; 1996
- Genre: Construction and management simulation
- Mode: Single-player

SimFarm: SimCity's Country Cousin is a video game in which players build and manage a virtual farm. It was developed by Maxis and released in 1993 as a spin-off of SimCity. The game included a teacher's guide to teaching with SimFarm with blackline masters to be photocopied for the class and a user manual. In 1996, SimFarm and several other Maxis simulation games were rereleased under the Maxis Collector Series, with greater compatibility with Windows 95 and differing box art, including the addition of Classics beneath the title.

== Gameplay ==
Simulating duties on a real farm in the contiguous United States, SimFarm puts players in charge of building up the land, placing the buildings, buying and selling livestock and planting crops. A weather and season system are in place as well, presenting the same kind of challenges found in a real-world farm. As with SimCity, there are disasters that can wreak havoc on the player's farm. Tornadoes, droughts, pests, and dust storms are some of the events that can disrupt farm crops and harvests. There are four types of livestock in SimFarm, all of which have specific food requirements, need water, and breed new livestock. Animals' value can be increased by making a barn available for their use.

SimFarm also has a small town included in its simulation. This town is reminiscent of SimCity in its form and function. The player may interact with the town occasionally by suggesting new tile types and joining competitions with livestock (such as sending in a prize pig to potentially earn a blue ribbon and a cash prize). Suggesting that an airport be built in the town will usually cause its construction, thus unlocking the ability to buy and use a crop duster.

The homestead in SimFarm is where the player lives; it is expanded at the beginning of each game year if the player has made enough money in the previous year. SimFarm allows the player to choose a location derived from the region and climate of one of nine areas of the US or to design one's own climate by selecting average winds, rainfall, and temperatures.

Equipment is necessary to maintain your farm and bring your crops to harvest. Structures store equipment, livestock, seeds, etc. The minimum equipment required to bring one field to harvest is one tractor, one planter, one plow, one harvester, one truck, and one trailer. The crops are the main revenue-raising item in SimFarm. All crops have specific maturity cycles, water requirements, temperature requirements, and resistance to pests, weeds, and diseases. Each crop type must be grown in a season that meets these requirements, and managed according to its needs, in order to produce a high-value crop.

== Reception ==
Reception

Review scores
Publication	Score
Electronic Entertainment	8 out of 10
PC Games	74%

Computer Gaming World in 1993 approved of the game's graphics and documentation. The magazine concluded that "it's not perfect, but learning how to SimFarm is a lot of fun". Despite giving an overall fun rating of 74%, PC Games expressed disdain for the game's monotony, further stating, "On the packaging they advertise it as 'Sim City's Country Cousin', and you should not expect anything more from this program."
