= SimSafari =

1998 video game

- North American cover art
- Developer: Maxis
- Publisher: Maxis
- Producer: Kana Ryan
- Designer: Roxana Wolosenko
- Programmer: Vasyl Tsvirkunov
- Artist: Bonnie Borucki
- Composer: Jerry Martin
- Series: Sim
- Platforms: Windows, Mac OS
- Release: NA: 19 March 1998; EU: 1999
- Genre: Construction and management simulation
- Mode: Single-player

SimSafari is a construction and management simulation game released by Maxis on March 19, 1998. It is similar to SimPark, except that the park is set in Africa rather than in North America, and therefore has African animals and plants.

== Gameplay ==
The game is divided into three different zones, the nature park, the tourist grounds, and the African village. The ultimate aim is for the players' park to reach five stars, although like most Sims games the player can continue playing indefinitely. To gain five stars, the player needs to make sure each zone is being run properly. The player can control tourism and staff.

- The park is where the player can buy animals and made sure they were not being over-eaten or underfed. The player can control the species of animals, grasses, shrubs, and trees that were built here. The game has information on every species in it, with short animations for the animals. Natural disasters can occur, like wildfires, droughts, locusts, and twisters.
- The Camp, also known as the Tourist Ground, is where tourists stay. The player can build restaurants, hotels, swimming pools, cottages, tents, etc. for guests. The buildings are staffed by workers hired from the village.
- In the village the player can hire drivers, naturalists, guides, cooks, and attendants to staff your tourist grounds. The more staff are hired, the better the village does. The village poaches your park's animals if the player does not hire enough staff. If things go very badly, the village might even stop working for you altogether. The player has the least control over the village because it is up to the AI to decide what to build.

There are several scenarios, including one where the park is overrun by rabbits and another where the camp is burned down.

== Development ==
SimSafari was one of a range of spin-off titles published by Maxis from the SimCity series targeted at younger players. The game was announced by Maxis in 1997 as part of a lineup including SimCity 3000 and Streets of SimCity. SimSafari was released on 19 March 1998 for Microsoft Windows and Macintosh.

== Reception ==
Reception

Review scores
Publication	Score
AllGame	4/5
Computer Games Strategy Plus	3.5/5
Ultimate PC	69%

Critics praised the game's visual presentation.

Reviews were divided on the challenge level of SimSafari. Some found the game difficult; describing the game as "far too hard", Ultimate PC considered the game required real-world ecological knowledge to succeed in a manner inappropriate for a children's title.

The A.V. Club retrospectively ranked SimSafari as one of the bottom Sim titles, finding it derivative of earlier titles as a "more exotic" variation of SimPark, although "perfectly functional".
