= SimRefinery =

1992 video game

- A screenshot of SimRefinery, similar in its user interface to SimCity, but featuring structural elements based on an oil refinery operation
- Developer: Maxis Business Simulations
- Publishers: Chevron Corporation; Maxis
- Series: Sim
- Release: NA: October 26, 1992
- Genre: Business simulation
- Mode: Single-player

SimRefinery is a computer management simulation game designed to simulate Chevron's Richmond refinery operation. It was developed by the Maxis Business Simulations division of Maxis in 1992. John Hiles, who was the head of the Maxis division, was a lead designer on the project.

== Development ==
After the success of SimCity, Maxis received numerous requests from various companies to develop simulations for their industries. After rejecting many requests from other companies, the team eventually agreed to make a prototype of SimRefinery for Chevron:

[SimRefinery was] a simulation of their refinery operation, for orienting people in the company as to how a refinery works. It wasn't so much for the engineers as it was for the accountants and managers who walked through this refinery every day and didn't know what these pipes were carrying.

— Will Wright

== Release and rediscovery ==
As a commissioned business aid, it was not made available to the public. Until 2020, little information about the game had existed, though Maxis had discussed its creation and some screenshots existed. Most of the assets stayed with Maxis Business Simulations, which Maxis eventually divested in 1996. The division rebranded itself as Thinking Tools Inc. and continued to develop similar corporate simulations, but eventually had to shutter itself, and most of its assets were destroyed.

In May 2020, librarian Phil Salvador published a long form investigative article about Maxis Business Simulations and SimRefinery featuring interviews with Hiles and other members of the division. Ars Technica reported on the article, which led to a commenter on the website uncovering a floppy disc that contains an in-development build of the game. The anonymous commenter then uploaded a digital copy to the Internet Archive to work within its DOSBox emulator.

This emulated version reveals more details about the "gameplay" of SimRefinery. The game resembles SimCity with different graphics, disasters, and rules, the former to represent oil tanker ports, petroleum storage and piping systems. The user's role in the simulation was the plant manager of a refinery. One of the things the user learned was about supply and demand and how it affects the financial situation. The game was not defined to be an accurate representation of the chemical processes of a plant, as it was believed it would be dangerously inadequate if used as a replacement for existing methods of technical education. Instead, it was intended to show how disparate systems of a chemical plant may end up interacting at the larger scale, incorporating the financial, production, and logistics related to operating a plant. The game allowed some "disasters" to be created by creating explosive mixtures of components that set off fires, as well as external events that may disrupt the plant. The game was not considered to be a fully finished product based on the version received by the Internet Archive.
