= Bing Gordon =

American video game executive

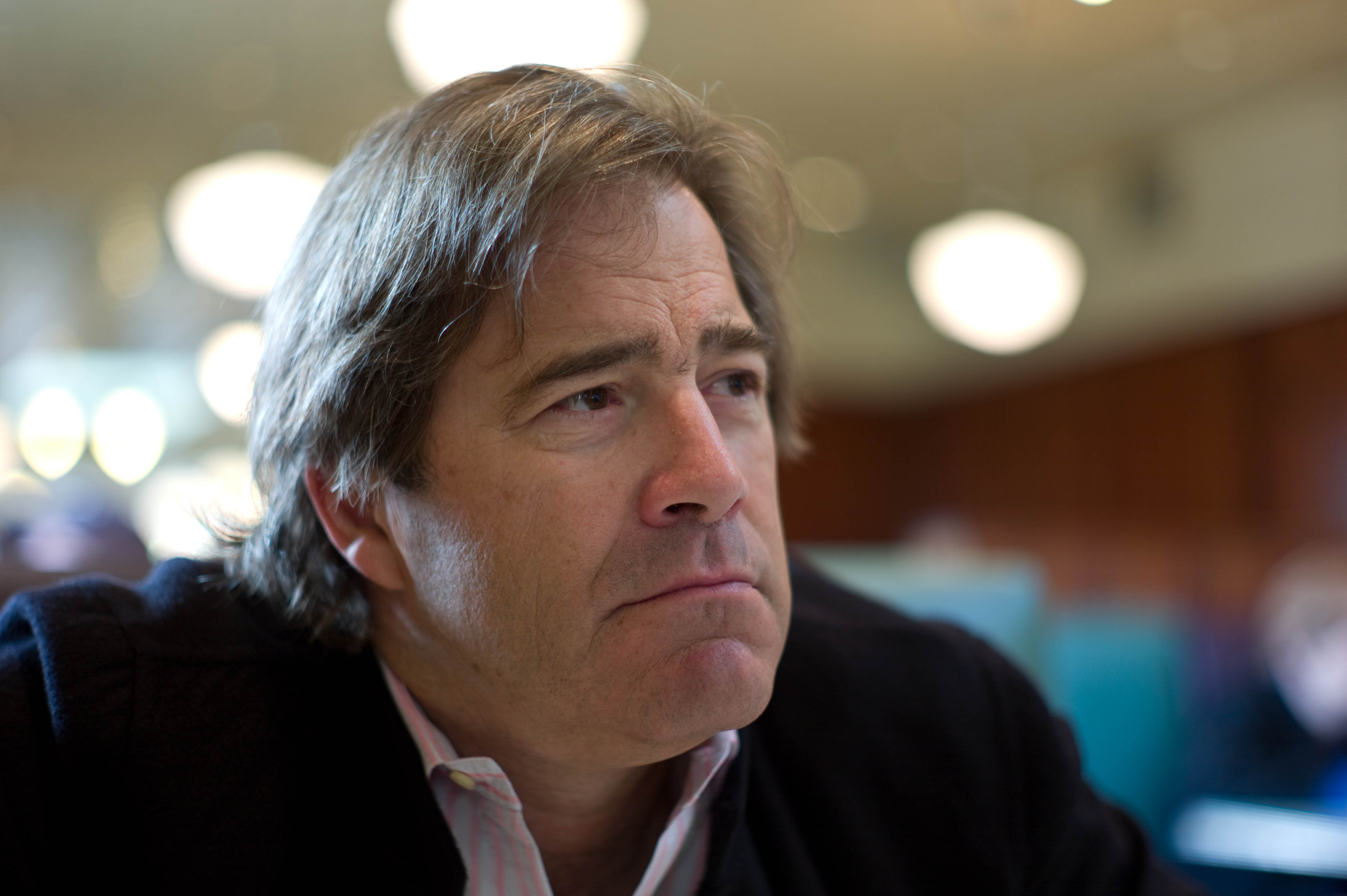
- Gordon in 2009
- Education: Cranbrook School; Yale University (BA); Stanford University (MBA)
- Occupations: Partner at Kleiner, Perkins, Caufield & Byers
- Spouse: Debra Gordon (née Radabaugh)
- Children: Chloe and Allegra Gordon
- Parent(s): William and Barbara Gordon
- Awards: Academy of Interactive Arts & Sciences’ Lifetime Achievement Award (2011)

William "Bing" Gordon is a video game executive and technology venture capitalist. He served ten years as Chief Creative Officer of video game publisher and developer Electronic Arts (EA) prior to his current partnership with Kleiner Perkins Caufield & Byers (KPCB). He was a founding director of Audible.com and has served on several high-profile Boards of Directors including Amazon, Ngmoco, Duolingo, and Zynga. He designed the video games Sid Meier's Alpha Centauri, Sid Meier's SimGolf and The Lord of the Rings: The Battle for Middle-earth.

== Career ==
Gordon graduated from Cranbrook School in 1968. He studied drama and literature and earned a BA from Yale University. He moved to the Bay Area where he received an MBA from Stanford in 1978 after acting for a period in New York City.

After working as an account executive at the advertising firm Ogilvy and Mather, Gordon joined EA in 1982 while it was an early-stage start-up, working as a one-person marketing department. As the company grew, Gordon continued to drive marketing strategy and execution. Gordon became more involved on the creative side after a few years, working directly with game teams on concepts, helping to flesh out game designs, and providing feedback on the games as they took shape in development. In 1998 he was named Chief Creative Officer of EA. In 2005, he took a faculty chair position at the University of Southern California's Interactive Media Division after EA invested in the fledgling program. On April 28, 2008 Gordon announced plans to leave EA to join the venture capital KPCB starting June 2008.

Gordon joined the Amazon Board of Directors in 2003 and resigned in 2017.

== Awards ==
Gordon was the recipient of the 2011 Academy of Interactive Arts & Sciences Lifetime Achievement Award.
