= Sid Meier's SimGolf =

2002 video game

- Developer: Firaxis Games
- Publisher: EA Games
- Producer: Nana Wallace
- Designers: Bing Gordon; Sid Meier
- Programmers: Sid Meier; Javier Sobrado; Jacob Solomon
- Artist: Gregory A. Cunningham
- Composer: Mark Cromer
- Series: Sim
- Platform: Microsoft Windows
- Release: NA: January 23, 2002; EU: July 12, 2002
- Genres: Simulation, sports
- Mode: Single player

Sid Meier's SimGolf is a video game developed by Firaxis and published by Electronic Arts in 2002. Players must successfully design golf courses and play them with their default professional golfer Gary Golf. Played in a near-isometric dimetric view, the game runs on fairly low system specs, and only at an 800x600 resolution.

== Gameplay ==
The game features a complete system that allows the player to build their own golf empire. Players begin with some money and choose a country to begin building the players' course. Once there, players begin by placing a teeing ground and a putting green for Hole One and are then allowed to go on adding or modifying what lies between: fairways, trees, rough, bunkers (or sand traps), landmarks, benches, paths, flowerbeds, terrain and just about anything players would normally see in a golf course. Players are advised not to waste money because if the budget stays in the red long enough, the game is over. If players design the course well, they can manage to build an entire 18-hole course while obtaining profits. Players can also populate their course with a variety of staff, such as groundskeepers who will pull out any unsightly weeds, greeters that will talk to customers, marshals to maintain pace of play, and drinks vendors to help golfers quench their thirst.

Player designed golf course.

Everything players add (or fail to) will modify the overall mood of the golfers; the main goal of the player is to make the course "look hard and play easy". Keeping them happy will allow them to invest in the players' course or donate a valuable landmark. Reward buildings, such as marinas, airstrips, and hotels, will be provided and may be used to beautify the landscape. Other facilities made available as players progress through the game include a snack bar, a putting green, a tennis court and homes to parodies of Hollywood stars or other international celebrities, such as Robin Williams, Bruce Springsteen, Pamela Anderson, or Rosie O'Donnell. These landmarks have different properties that help the environment in some way, improving unpopular spots and otherwise calming down angry golfers (Every part of the course is rated in this way, so that players have to raise its value with fun, skill and intelligence to have customers like it). There is an "aura" overlay that displays areas that tend to generate favorable, neutral or unfavorable responses from golfers.

The game also enables the player to save their professional golfer and then play championships with him to earn some extra money to further embellish or expand the course. On the official website players can visit the exchange part and enter a huge archive of player-designed Championship courses for players to download and play. Further adding to its depth, golfers play in pairs and usually talk about their own interests. If players put the proper landmarks in the proper places, these stories may progress and have a happy ending, which also adds to players' course. There is also a 'sandbox' mode, which allows players to play the game with an infinite amount of money, so they can hone their designing skills.

SimGolf calculates the skill rating of your course. There are three skills all golfers either have or don't have: length, accuracy, and imagination. Length is the ability to hit the ball a long way, accuracy the ability to hit the ball straight, and imagination is the ability to "shape" shots the way you want to and put spin on the ball. The skill rating of a hole is determined by the average score of people with each skill compared to the average score of people without each skill. For example, if the average score of people with all three skills is 4, and without length is 4.5, you have a length rating of 0.5. The skill rating of your hole is the rating in all three categories added together, and the skill rating of your course is the ratings of all your holes added together.

== Reception ==
Reception

Aggregate score
Aggregator	Score
Metacritic	84/100

Review scores
Publication	Score
AllGame	4.5/5
Computer Gaming World	5/5
Game Informer	9.25/10
GameRevolution	B+
GameSpot	8.8/10
GameSpy	80%
GameZone	8.7/10
IGN	8.5/10
PC Gamer (US)	76%
X-Play	4/5
Maxim	10/10

The game received "favorable" reviews according to the review aggregation website Metacritic.

SimGolf was nominated for Computer Gaming World's 2002 "Strategy Game of the Year" award, which ultimately went to Freedom Force. It was also a runner-up for GameSpot's annual "Best Single-Player Strategy Game on PC" award, losing to Medieval: Total War.
