= Wrath of the Gods =

1994 video game

- Developers: Luminaria; Some Interactive
- Publisher: Luminaria
- Platforms: Windows, Mac OS
- Release: NA: 1994
- Genre: Adventure

Wrath of the Gods is a 1994 adventure-style computer game. It was distributed by Maxis. It makes use of digitized backgrounds and sprites. The story is based on concepts and characters from Greek mythology. Billboard called it a "landmark effort" in the realm of live-action games.

The game is played from the perspective of a young royal child prophesied to inherit his parents' kingdom. Abandoned on a mountainside to the wolves, he is discovered and raised by the centaur Chiron. Upon reaching adulthood, Chiron gives the young man a ring found in his baby blankets, along with a few gems, and sends him out into the world.

The game is played from a two-dimensional perspective, and the player moves by clicking in the appropriate direction. Throughout the adventures, the player meets characters from Greek mythology. Billboard noted its "high quality visuals, seamless effects and wealth of interactive features".

The game also features an educational component where the player can view images of Greek art and learn about Greek mythology and history.

== Reception ==
In April 1994, Computer Gaming World said that Wrath of the Gods offered "hours and hours of enjoyment" for fans of Ray Harryhausen's Jason and the Argonauts and others. The magazine stated that, unlike other multimedia titles, it "is interactive enough to play like a game, yet still retains a cinematic feel", with good acting, a "solid story line", and hints for those unfamiliar with Greek myth. Despite lacking fast travel, the magazine concluded that "Wrath of the Gods is a fun and educational adventure for both the seasoned and novice player. Luminaria has blended a fine mix of hip history, challenging game play, and quality presentation".
