= SimHealth =

1994 video game

SimHealth: The National Health Care Simulation
- Developer: Thinking Tools
- Publisher: Maxis
- Director: John Hiles
- Producer: Mike Perry
- Designers: Greg Wolfson; John Hiles
- Programmer: Richard Rosenbaum
- Artist: Jenny Martin
- Composers: Brian Conrad; Randy Jones; Don Walters
- Series: Sim
- Platform: MS-DOS
- Release: NA: 1994
- Genre: Management simulation
- Mode: Single-player

SimHealth: The National Health Care Simulation is a management simulation video game developed by Thinking Tools and published by Maxis in 1994 for MS-DOS with assistance from the Markle Foundation. It is a simulation of the United States healthcare system. The game was released during congressional debates on the Clinton health care plan.

Due to the complexity of the game, SimHealth was seen as being very difficult. Armed with none of the tongue-in-cheek humor that Maxis' prior games were known for, the only real link to the franchise was the SimCity 2000-inspired user interface. The game was seen as more serious than other Maxis games. Noel Fritzinger, who with Lyman Orton first conceptualized CommunityViz, says that his inspiration came from seeing SimHealth and wondering if the same concepts could be applied to real-world land-use planning.

== Reception ==
Computer Gaming World's Keith Schlesinger in June 1994 said that "SimHealth is a trailblazer in the simulations genre, but as a game it has problems". Acknowledging that "it wasn't primarily designed as an entertainment product", he criticized the "not well developed" victory conditions, reporting that he got a high score in one game by "sacrific[ing] nearly all of the big and small business firms in the country to achieve the win! What kind of a victory is that?" Schlesinger found that adopting an extreme libertarian ideology including ending Medicare and many other government services resulted in almost hands-off victory although "the entire private insurance industry goes bankrupt in the first three months". He nonetheless concluded that "SimHealth offers much at a good price, and in a good cause", and recommended it to those "not too fussy about winning and losing", or wanting to be able to alter the model's 152 assumptions. Entertainment Weekly gave the game a C−, writing, "For a vivid demonstration of just how complex—and boring—the health care crisis is, try spending a few hours with SimHealth, which lets you do what Hillary Clinton couldn't: design a successful national health care system."

Paul Starr, a health care policy expert writing for The American Prospect, was critical of the game. He pointed out various factual errors and extensively criticized its community vs. efficiency and liberty vs. equality axes, arguing that these values were not necessarily opposed to each other. He ultimately concluded that game "has no value in assessing health care reform."
