= SimAnt =

1991 video game

SimAnt: The Electronic Ant Colony
- Original cover art
- Developer: Maxis (Note: Ported to FM Towns, PC-98, X68000 and SNES by Imagineer)
- Publisher: Maxis
- Designers: Justin McCormick; Will Wright
- Series: Sim
- Platforms: Mac, MS-DOS, Windows 3.x, Amiga, FM Towns, PC-98, X68000, Super NES
- Release: Mac, MS-DOS, Windows; 1991; Amiga; 1992; FM Towns, PC-98, X68000; 1993; SNES: JP: February 26, 1993; NA: November 1993
- Genre: Life simulation
- Mode: Single player

SimAnt: The Electronic Ant Colony is a 1991 life simulation video game by Maxis and the company's third product, focusing on the lifecycle of ants. It was designed by Will Wright. In 1992, it was named "Best Simulation Game" at the Software Publishers Association's Codie awards. SimAnt was re-released in 1993 as part of the SimClassics Volume 1 compilation alongside SimCity Classic and SimLife for MS-DOS, Mac and Amiga. In 1996, SimAnt, alongside several of Maxis' simulation games were re-released under the Maxis Collector Series with greater compatibility with Windows 95 and differing box art, including the addition of Classics beneath the title.

== Gameplay ==
The game is a simulation of an ant colony. Wright was inspired by E. O. Wilson's study of ant colonies. The game consists of three modes: a Quick Game, a Full Game, and an Experimental Game. It was released for MS-DOS, Amiga, Mac, and Super NES. The Super NES version adds eight scenarios, where the goal in each is to eliminate the enemy red ants in various locales, each with different hazards.

In SimAnt, the player plays the role of an ant in a colony of black ants in the back yard of a suburban home. The ant colony must battle against enemy red ants. The ultimate goal is to spread throughout the garden, into the house, and finally to drive out the red ants and human owners. In this respect, SimAnt differed from other 'Sim' games that were open-ended and had no victory conditions.

Yard view with surface view underneath, Windows 3.x version

In the Quick Game, the player establishes a black ant colony in a small patch of yard, shown in top-down perspective. The computer opponent establishes a competing red ant colony in the same patch. Underground ant colonies are depicted in a side view. The player has direct control of a single ant at a time, indicated by a yellow color, and may switch control to a different ant at any time by either double-clicking the desired ant or choosing Exchange from the Yellow Ant menu and clicking on it.

The player's yellow ant may influence the behavior of other black ants by leaving pheromone trails to destinations such as food and enemy ant colonies and can control the other ants in a limited way, by ordering a certain number to follow it, for instance. The yellow ant can also dig new tunnels underground and expand the network of the black colony. The quick game is won or lost when either the red or black colony in said patch is defeated.

The player's yellow ant may pick up food and pebbles, engage in trophallaxis by receiving regurgitated food from friendly ants, and attack enemy ants. Groups of ants, or the yellow ant with her recruits, may attack and kill bigger enemies like spiders, caterpillars, and antlions. Natural hazards include human footsteps, electrical outlets, bug spray, spiders, antlions, lawnmowers, and rain, which washes away pheromone trails and can flood the bottom of ant nests.

In the Full Game, the player begins with an ant colony in an overhead view, much like the Quick Game. The region of this overhead view is a single square of a map containing a yard and house. The player spreads to other areas by producing young queens and drones to mate with each other. The full game is lost when the black colonies are eliminated and won when the red colonies are eliminated and the humans are driven out of the house.

The Experimental Game is similar to the Quick Game, except the player can control red ants and spiders and has access to a set of experimental tools. These tools allow the player to place pheromone trails, maze walls, rocks, ants, pesticides and food.

The game comes with an instruction manual in the box, which covers game mechanics as well as a large amount of information regarding real world ants and ant societies.

== Development ==
We've been able to study social insects and really understand how that intelligence emerges from a collection of very simple little parts, to a degree that's far ahead of the understanding of the brain and its processes. That's, at the lowest level, what's always fascinated me about ants. Kids in particular, they see ants, and what ants do and how organized they are, and there's something almost magical about it. It surprised me that no one had ever done a game about ants, and I kept waiting and waiting, and they never did. So it felt like something that I had to do, because I wanted to play it.

— Will Wright, February 2005

SimAnt was developed by Maxis and designed and programmed by the company's co-founder Will Wright alongside his high school friend Justin McCormick. The two each did about half the code and design on the game. Total production time was less than a year due to their round-the-clock effort. While Wright focused on the simulation core during the day, McCormick handled much of the front-end programming at night with the duo meeting twice daily. This was Wright's third simulation title following 1989's SimCity and 1990's SimEarth. While SimEarth was a result of Wright's desire to create a simulation other than a direct sequel to the city-building of SimCity, he described SimAnt as a "slight overreaction" to the seriousness of SimEarth. "I wanted SimAnt to go in the opposite direction: something non-intimidating, something lighthearted, something fun, something where it was really clear what went wrong," he explained.

Wright was intrigued by social insects and had been patiently waiting for the release of a computer simulation of an ant farm. When this never occurred he opted to create one himself. Most of the games he worked on resulted from his academic interest in a field of study and simulation development was "almost an excuse to do years of research on a subject." SimAnt was largely based on the research of Harvard University biologist E. O. Wilson, specifically his 1990 zoology textbook The Ants. Written with colleague Bert Hölldobler, the book details the behavior of ants and the intricacies of their colonies. Wright considered Wilson to be "kind of the myrmecologist" or "the premier myrmecologist" and referencing his work was paramount to building a model for the game. He was particularly interested in Wilson's explorations of emergence whereby individual ants performing basic tasks can collectively accomplish very complex goals.

Using Wilson's scientific data, Wright said the game was designed with layers of complexity based on how ants function in the real world, making it a form of "self-directed learning." Wright and McCormick attempted to contact Wilson during development to see if he would like to assist directly on the game. Their letter allegedly arrived at the same time Wilson received a Pulitzer Prize notice for The Ants. Wilson commented that the game "captured the subtleties of life in an ant colony" and that he was charmed enough by its "sophistication and precision" that he would recommend it to entomology students. After completing a year's worth of the work on the game, Wright lost his home in October 1991 during the Oakland firestorm. He had moved the game's source code from his house to his office just two weeks prior.

== Release ==
Maxis partnered with Broderbund to first release SimAnt in North America in November 1991. Versions were available for Mac, MS-DOS, Windows 3.x, and Amiga. The Macintosh version could be played in monochrome or color. Similarly, the Amiga conversion included both low and high resolution graphical settings. Ocean Software distributed the game in Europe in 1992. In Japan, Imagineer published SimAnt for Macintosh in November 1991. The company subsequently released conversions to FM Towns, PC-98, X68000, and Super Famicom in February 1993. This last port, developed by Tomcat System, contains eight gameplay scenarios alongside the full game; has unique graphics and music; and is compatible with the Super NES Mouse. It was localized by Maxis for the North American Super NES in November 1993.

SimAnt saw several re-releases on PC. The original game was included on the SimClassics Volume 1 compilation in September 1994 alongside SimCity and SimLife. SimAnt was also sold individually as part of the Maxis Collector's Series in 1996. A canceled enhanced CD-ROM version was planned for a November 1993 release featuring Super VGA graphics, digital sound, 20 minutes of full-motion video, and an avatar named SimAntha to entertain and guide the player.

== Reception ==
Reception

Review score
| Publication | Score |
|---|---|
| Famitsu | (SNES): 7/10, 7/10, 8/10, 7/10 |

The game was reviewed in 1992 in Dragon #178 by Patricia Hartley and Kirk Lesser in "The Role of Computers" column. The reviewers gave the game 5 out of 5 stars. Computer Gaming World stated that "players seeking a non-linear, unconventional and provocative strategy simulation will hit paydirt with SimAnt. The game is easy to get into, stimulating, fun, and increasingly challenging ... students will love it".

GamePro named it "Educational Game of the Year", commenting that "SimAnt is a delightful combination of simulation, strategy, and adventure."

== Legacy ==
Like its predecessor SimEarth, SimAnt achieved only middling sales. It sold over 50,000 copies by February 1992. According to one game box, using a statistic from the Software Publisher's Association, more than 100,000 copies of the PC version had sold by April 10, 1992. Designer Will Wright stated in 1994 that he considered the game his biggest disappointment up to that point in his career as he felt he failed to convey "how cool ants are." In a 1996 postmortem, Wright considered SimAnt as effectively educational yet "too simple" and lacking the same level of creativity and personal imprinting of the original SimCity. Though not as popular with the targeted adult demographic, the lower complexity of SimAnt ultimately connected best with children, specifically boys aged ten to thirteen years of age. Misgauging a game's core audience was a lesson Wright learned from his experience with the game. He said in 2003 that he would like to remake SimAnt with a more immersive, first-person perspective if given the opportunity. The designer claimed to continue studying books about ants years after the game's completion.

Wright has stated that working on SimAnt helped inspire him to create the hugely successful social simulation game The Sims, first released by Maxis in 2000. The use of ant pheromone trails in the former game was used as a model to drive the wants and needs of the human-like behavior of the Sims in the latter.

The crowdfunded real-time strategy game Empires of the Undergrowth, released for early access on Steam in 2024, is considered a spiritual successor to SimAnt.

== See also ==
- Ant-keeping
- Formicarium
- Ant colony optimization algorithms
