= The Sims Carnival =

Video game series

The Sims Carnival was a casual games series created by Electronic Arts. The Sims Carnival had two separate product lines. First, it was an online community of crowd-sourced games. Second, it was a line of packaged game titles sold via retail stores and digital download.

== Online game community ==
SimsCarnival.com was an online community centered on users playing, creating and sharing games.

The online community was supported by a suite of game creation tools, audio and graphic asset packs, a YouTube-style website with a leaderboard and other social features, first-party games, ongoing content releases, and user-generated games across many genres (e.g. sports, puzzles, adventure games, racing games, tower defense games, and Angry Birds-style games).

Three game creation tools—The Wizard, The Swapper and The Game Creators—assisted the players with game design. The Wizard led players through the process of creating a game step-by-step with intuitive options designed to help them create their own game (e.g., make their own Tower Defense game) with a library of game genres to choose from. The Swapper let players customize existing games – or newly made games from The Wizard — with their own selection of images, aiding in game personalization. With The Game Creator, and its library of images, animations and sounds, individuals could create a game from scratch or customize another player's creation.

Because the games were "open source", players could take someone else's creation, give the original creators attributions and customize the games as they see fit (e.g., apply different graphics and storyline).

SimsCarnival.com debuted at the GDC (Game Developers Conference) in February 2008 with a keynote speech by the studio head of The Sims. The service ceased in January 2011.

== Reception ==
- Dana Jongewaard (June 17, 2008). "The Sims Carnival Updated Beta Impressions Preview". 1UP.com. Archived from the original on June 7, 2016.
- "Sims Carnival is now in open beta". Engadget. June 17, 2008. Archived from the original on July 10, 2016.
- Mike Fahey (June 17, 2008). "SimsCarnival.com Enters Open Beta". Kotaku. Archived from the original on October 11, 2008.
- "The Sims Label Announces Games Destinations Website Now in Open Beta. Play, create and share games of all kinds!". IGN. Archived from the original on July 15, 2012.
- "A Look At Sims Carnival Games: Did I Just Get 'Rickrolled' By Electronic Arts?". MTV. Archived from the original on May 19, 2009.
- "SimsCarnival.com in open beta". Gameplanet. Archived from the original on March 3, 2016.

== Packaged titles ==
A screenshot from The Sims Carnival SnapCity

Two packaged game titles were announced around December 2007, and were available for download on the EA Link site. Outside of the shared brand name, there was no connection between SimsCarnival.com and these two packaged game titles (e.g. no user-generated games in these two titles).

=== Bumperblast ===
A Sim themed shoot 'em up.

=== Snap City ===
Snap City is a puzzle based spin-off of SimCity released on January 8, 2008. SnapCity is not an on-line game but single-player only. It comes with the software bundle The SimCity Box.

The game is played by placing residential, commercial, and industrial zones, which consist of tiles that fall like in Tetris, onto a flat map. Players can build a special zone where civic buildings like schools and parks if enough zones are placed next to each other. Zones must be connected by roads to develop. Natural disasters can also occur, which harm the city's treasury. There are two main game modes; creative mode and story mode. In creative mode, play is open-ended, but in story mode there are a total of 25 goals in different cities that the player has to accomplish.

Kevin VanOrd of GameSpot gave the game 4.5/10 and compared the game to Tetris and said that "[the game] is easy to play, but it's hard to wrap your head around."
