= Widget Workshop =

1995 video game

- Developer: Elliott Portwood Productions
- Publisher: Maxis
- Platforms: MS-DOS, Windows, Classic Mac OS
- Release: NA: 1995
- Genre: Construction and management simulation

Widget Workshop: A Mad Scientist's Laboratory is a hands-on science kit, for use on the computer and off. It was released in 1995 and is one of the more obscure Maxis products. It was designed by Lauren Elliott, co-author of the Where in the World is Carmen Sandiego game series.

The game has two main modes. Much like in The Incredible Machine, users can solve a variety of puzzles using a limited selection of parts or tinker with the freeform mode. Widget Workshop focuses more on the freeform mode than the other game.

Unlike the Rube Goldberg nature of The Incredible Machine, the parts in Widget Workshop are not restricted to the mechanical or physical. Items include display boxes, graphing windows, random number generators, and mathematical tools ranging from addition and subtraction to Boolean logic gates and trigonometric functions. The items can be connected in a manner similar to dataflow programming. While the arrangement of the items on screen does not matter, the connections do: a numerical constant box could be connected to a mathematical function; connected to a graph, which would display a horizontal line; input as a color value on an RGB monitor; or even used to trigger a sound effect.
