= Top Gun (1986 video game) =

- Developer: Ocean Software
- Publishers: Ocean Software; Thunder Mountain (U.S.)
- Series: Top Gun
- Platforms: Amstrad CPC, Atari ST, Commodore 64, ZX Spectrum
- Release: 1986–87
- Genre: Combat flight simulation
- Modes: Single-player, multiplayer

Top Gun is a 1986 combat flight simulation game based on the film of the same name. It was developed and published by British company Ocean Software, and was released for several computer platforms. In the United Kingdom, it was released for Amstrad CPC, Commodore 64, and ZX Spectrum in December 1986. The following year, it was released for Atari ST. In the United States, it was published by Thunder Mountain. In 1989, it was published by The Hit Squad as a budget re-release for ZX Spectrum and Commodore 64.

== Gameplay ==
Top Gun is a combat flight simulation game. The game is viewed with two vertical split screens, one for the player's fighter plane and one for an enemy plane. Both screens are viewed from within the cockpit. On each level, the player faces off against three enemy planes, one at a time. The player advances to the next level after defeating the three planes. The player can use a machine gun and missiles against enemies, who become more difficult to defeat as the game progresses. The machine gun is prone to overheating if used continually, and missiles must be locked on to a target for three seconds before they can be launched. Enemy planes also have missiles, and a single missile is fatal to both the player and the enemy plane. The player can drop a flare to distract an incoming enemy missile. An instrument panel gives the player information such as altitude, speed, and machine gun temperature.

Top Gun includes a two-player mode in which both players receive three planes. Both players start with a plane each and use it in combat against the other player. If a plane is destroyed, the player uses another one. A player loses the game if all three planes are destroyed by the other player.

== Reception ==
Reception

Review scores
Publication	Score
Crash	90% (ZX Spectrum); 53% (ZX Spectrum re-release)
Sinclair User	3/5 (ZX Spectrum)
Your Sinclair	8/10 (ZX Spectrum)
Zzap!64	61% (C64 re-release)
Computer Gamer	90% (Amstrad CPC)
Datormagazin	3.5/5 (C64)
Génération 4	15% (Atari ST)
Happy Computer	61/100 (Amstrad CPC)
.info	3/5 (C64)
Popular Computing Weekly	3/5 (Amstrad CPC)

Award
Publication	Award
Crash	Smash!

Reviewers for Crash were surprised by how good the game was, and they offered particular praise for the two-player mode. Paul Boughton of Computer and Video Games described the game as a "neat combination of flight simulation mixed with sky high duelling". Mike Roberts of Computer Gamer stated that Top Gun and Ace were the best flight games he had ever played up to that point. John Cook of Popular Computing Weekly concluded that the game was not a bad effort, and recommended it for people wanting a "minimalist" two-player air combat game. Benn Dunnington of .info called the game a simple but fun shoot 'em up. John Gilbert of Sinclair User stated that the game lacked depth and action and said that the game is not simulation or arcade.

Gilbert criticized the graphics, describing them as "almost non-existent", also writing that the combat takes place at night, giving Ocean an excuse for black background on both cockpit views. Phil South of Your Sinclair praised the graphics and called the game as fun Roberts, reviewing the CPC version, wrote that the graphics are crude but completely in keeping with the style of the game. His only criticism of the game was that the game could have a realistic control of the plane. Cook, also reviewing the CPC version, said that the keyboard controls in the two-player mode were badly laid out but it still produced fair entertainment. Boughton considered the gameplay enjoyable and the controls simple to use.

Roberts noted that the instrument panel sounded a bit cluttered, but was easy to read and the vertical split screen worked well. Tony Hetherington of ZX Computing also found the instrument panel easy to read, and stated that the split screen displays "worked exceptionally well and made the game a lot easier than the normal horizontal display".

Nick Roberts reviewed the ZX Spectrum re-release for Crash. He described the monochrome graphics as "boring white on black" and described the sound as just a blip when firing at another plane. Roberts stated that the game was better with two players, and thought that Top Gun is more for simulation fans rather than for fans of the film. Zzap!64, reviewing the Commodore 64 re-release, called the gameplay simple, but noting that the graphics lacks the smoothness. The reviewer considered the game as a rental, rather than a full-priced game to buy.

In the US, Top Gun was a commercial hit, with sales above 500,000 units by 1989. At the time, Joyce Worley of Video Games & Computer Entertainment noted that the game was "still racking up the numbers".
