= The Sims FreePlay =

2011 mobile game

- Developers: EA Mobile; Firemonkeys Studios; Slingshot Studios
- Publisher: Electronic Arts
- Composers: Nick Balaban; Michael Rubin; Steve Jablonsky (Note: The Sims Freeplay reutilizes tracks written by Jablonsky for The Sims 3.)
- Series: The Sims
- Platforms: iOS, Android, BlackBerry 10, Windows Phone
- Release: iOS; December 15, 2011; Android; February 15, 2012; Blackberry 10; July 31, 2013 (discontinued); Windows Phone 8 September 12, 2013 (discontinued)
- Genres: Life simulation, Social simulation
- Mode: Single-player

The Sims FreePlay is a strategic life simulation game developed by EA Mobile and later with Firemonkeys Studios. It is a freemium version of The Sims for mobile devices; it was released for iOS on December 15, 2011, released for Android on February 15, 2012, released for BlackBerry 10 on July 31, 2013, and released for Windows Phone 8 on September 12, 2013.

== Gameplay ==
In The Sims FreePlay, players "build" and design houses and customize and create (a maximum of 34) virtual people called Sims. Players can control their Sims to satisfy their wishes, and let them complete different kinds of actions to gain Simoleons, Lifestyle Points, and Social Points (all three currencies in the game). The game runs in real-time, and takes real time to complete actions. All actions must be instructed by players, unlike in the Windows version, where Sims have some degree of autonomy. Players can progress through 60 levels to unlock content (such as furniture for the Sims’ houses) that can be purchased with the virtual currencies previously mentioned. Families of Sims can have children provided there is one adult Sim; there is a limit on the amount of allowable couples due to a limit on the people in the player's town. If the player buys items from the online store, they become a VIP that will allow them to increase the number of Sims they can have in their town. In the game, there are "quests" that players are required to complete as well as optional quests ("discovery quests") that they may choose to pursue. Sims must bake a cake to age until completion of a certain quota of discovery quests.

=== Currency ===
The game features three types of currency: Simoleons, Lifestyle Points, and Social Points, the latter being obtainable by spending real currency or earning it in-game.

=== Life Stages ===
There are six life stages and they differ from each other both in terms of the graphic aspect of the Sim and the actions it can perform. Each Sim can advance in stage (therefore in age) via a birthday cake, an item that is obtained for the price of five life points after a day of work on a Sim in the oven. The various characteristics for each stage are these:

- Infant: To give birth to an infant Sim, simply buy a crib from the catalog, place it inside a Sim's home, and pay a price of 3 Lifestyle Points or a set price in Simoleons (if already finished with the Life Dreams and Legacies quest, or if it's the town's first infant Sim). The player then needs to wait 24 hours for the stork for the birth of the infant Sim. Then, with an update, released in early summer 2018, a pregnant Sim can now become incitement, in 2 different ways: The first lasts 6 days, and is the most expensive. During this time, the pregnant Sim's belly grows until delivery at the end of the 6 days. Then the second, cheaper option, lasts 9 days and the player can carry out various actions that at the birth of the infant Sim will give them a life bonus that will give them various enhancements (their needs are lowered more slowly, they finish the actions earlier, etc.) up to their death. Once the wait is over, the player can customize the infant Sim's appearance, name, skin colour, etc. Infant Sims can only interact with teen Sims, adult Sims, senior Sims, and some pets.
- Toddler: Toddler Sims can do many things, such as walking, talking, going to the toilet, going to bed alone, riding toy horses and more. They cannot eat alone and therefore need an adult Sim to give them food, unless using a dish cooked by an adult Sim. They also need the help of an adult Sim to wash themselves. They can also interact with another toddler Sims, preteen Sims, teen Sims, and senior Sims.
- Preteen: Preteen Sims can start pursuing hobbies like ballet and karate, go to SimTown elementary school, and learn to read and write accordingly. At this age they can wash themselves and eat alone, but they cannot cook.
- Teen: The ability to become a teen Sim was introduced with an update released in November 2013, along with the ability to build the SimTown high school. Teen Sims can have romantic relationships and become "teen idol Sims". They can also start using the stove and toaster for cooking.
- Adult: The main state of the game. An adult Sim has the ability to work, build homes, and start a family. This is the only case in which it is possible to create a Sim without cost, it is enough to have a free house to be able to create a new adult Sim.
- Senior: If adult Sims use a birthday cake they will become senior Sims. Senior Sims can have new hobbies, play bingo, and have new animals, such as birds.

=== House customization ===
A limited number of houses can be built depending on the player's level and in any case not exceeding that of empty land on the city map. The player can build a house starting from standard blueprints that include houses to be furnished (lower price) or already furnished (higher price) or from special architect projects, also can start from extra game projects if unlocked in one of the various quests. The furniture of each house is customizable by the player by buying objects from the catalog that concern both the exteriors and the interiors, moving the various objects (including doors) in the rooms. There is also the possibility of moving objects between different houses via the player's inventory. There are standard furniture items that are unlocked as the player progresses and special items that can be obtained through special quests or bought during special offers in the catalog.

=== Events ===
In the game occasionally, SimChase is a television reality show hosted by a Sim named Kam Ham. Each episode consists of tasks to complete to beat a rival. Failing to beat the tasks within 24 hours of the episode beginning will make your sim lose out on the prize for that series of tasks. If the player can't complete an episode before the time runs out, they can choose to skip it with Social Points. If prizes are missed, and the SimChase season ends, the rival will sell some cheaper prizes for Social Points. By completing episodes before the rival completes them, players can win furniture and cosmetic items, as well as "Chase Tokens", which are used in the Roadworks Spin, which can give the player boosts such as:

- Roadblocks, which add an extra 30 minutes of time to complete the current episode
- Mega Roadblocks, which add an extra 60 minutes of time to complete the current episode
- Mastery Discounts, which reduce the cost of the Mastery Challenge in the current episode
- Snail's Pace, which makes the rival's current Challenge take double the time it usually would take.

== Updates ==
As of April 2017, Windows Phones no longer receive updates from the game. In June 2018, pregnancy and baby showers were added to the game. People said that fans requested the feature be added to the game ever since FreePlay launched. Before this update, adult Sims had to marry for an option to be given to add an infant Sim to the family. On October 15, 2018, augmented reality multiplayer was added. In July 2019, the autosave function was added. In March 2025 dynamic lighting graphics were implemented, resulting in more realistic aspects such as sunlight through windows, shadows, and lighting that adjusts accordingly throughout the day. However, some players have reported that older iOS and Android devices are unable to support such graphics. Officially, devices with model GPUs for supporting enhanced visuals are iPhone X/Galaxy S20 at minimum and iPhone 12/Galaxy S23 at recommended.

== Reception ==
The Sims Freeplay received "Generally favorable reviews" from critics, holding an aggregated Metacritic score of 80/100. Gamezebo site called FreePlay more than just a social app, but a beautiful reimagining of The Sims 3. Nissa Campbell of TouchArcade believes that FreePlay is very similar in spirit to the original The Sims of 2000 and seems to be listening to the claims left back in those days - to add MMORPG elements to its gameplay. AppGamer also noted that the timing mechanic makes the player either love Freeplay or hate it, especially for those who don't like to wait for hours.

=== Censorship ===
The video game was banned in China, Saudi Arabia, United Arab Emirates, Oman, Kuwait, Qatar and Egypt due to the possibility of establishing a LGBTQ+ relationship.

== See also ==
- The Sims Mobile
