= SimPark =

1996 video game

- Developer: Maxis
- Publisher: Maxis
- Designers: Roxana Wolosenko; Claire Curtin
- Programmer: Ed Nanale
- Artists: Bonnie Borucki; Sharon Barr
- Composer: Jerry Martin
- Series: Sim
- Platforms: Windows, Macintosh
- Release: 31 October 1996
- Genres: Simulation, Education
- Mode: Single-player

SimPark is a 1996 video game developed and published by Maxis for Windows and Macintosh. It is a simulation video game where players are tasked to cultivate and manage a successful park in North America. Players must balance the ecosystem by placing a sustainable number of flora, fauna, and facilities for park visitors, whilst managing disasters. Upon release, SimPark received average reviews, with critics praising the game as an educational tool to introduce children to environmental issues, although felt the game was simplistic compared to other simulation titles by the developer.

== Gameplay ==
SimPark screenshot

SimPark is a simulation video game in which players assume the role of a park ranger, and design a park by placing animals, plants and amenities for visitors. Players select a region of North America to situate their park, organised by climate, and are provided a vacant plot of land to populate. Fauna follow a food chain, and prefer certain climates and seasons, requiring players to manage the balance of plants, animals and people to sustain the park's ecosystem. Compatible flora and fauna to the climate of the park are highlighted in the user interface, and players can place flora categorised by trees, shrubs, grasses and flowers.

Players can place amenities including include benches, play equipment and services such as hotdog stands. Amenities attract visitors to the park, which earns money, although visitors deposit garbage which must be managed by placing trash cans in the park. Disasters can automatically occur or be triggered by players that affect the park, including fires, tornadoes, swarms of kudzu bugs, or an alien invasion.

SimPark provides several tools to help players manage the park. Statistics about the park can be viewed in the Park Census and Population Graph menu. A Field Guide provides a database of information on plants and animals, their call, and their relationship in the food chain. The Identa-Species window challenges players to visually identify species from a close-up photograph. The Budget window overviews the finances of the park. Players receive additional guidance in the form of in-game emails to receive messages on the status of the park, and Rizzo, a frog mascot, who appears onscreen to provide advice on park management. An Interview feature also allows players to receive verbal feedback on the status of selected flora and fauna.

== Development ==
SimPark was released by Maxis as a spin-off title in its Sim series and designed for children. Maxis stated their educational goals for the game were to inspire players to gain real-world insights from playing SimPark, understand the interrelationship between the environment and living organisms, and appreciate the "delicate balance inherent in the natural world". The game was released with a guide for students and teachers to use the software in the classroom. In 2001, SimPark was re-released alongside five other Maxis children's titles in a compilation named SimMania for Kids.

== Reception ==
Reception

Review scores
Publication	Score
AllGame	3.5/5
GameSpot	6.5/10
Evansville Courier & Press	4/4

Reviewers praised SimPark as an effective educational tool for learning about ecosystems, with The Columbian writing that it introduced children to unfamiliar flora and fauna. Some reviewers felt the simulation gameplay was simplistic, with the Albuquerque Journal praising its "open-ended" and "intelligent gameplay, but considering it lacked the "sophisticated management" features of other Sim titles. Reviewers remarked that the game made it impossible to fail or run out of money, with GameSpot writing the game was "extremely forgiving" as "it's virtually impossible to fail at park management".

Reviewers were mixed on the graphics, with The Daily Iberian describing it as "visually stunning", and the Washington Post praising its "finely-animated" wildlife; Allgame felt the visuals were "adequate but nothing spectacular". The disasters were retrospectively identified by Allgame and GameInformer as a highlight of the gameplay. In a list of Maxis Sim titles, The A.V. Club ranked SimPark poorly, considering it was "more juvenile" and had a "reduced scope and sense of importance" compared to SimIsle, although was a "fitting introduction" to introducing children to ecosystems.

=== Accolades ===
SimPark received an award from Technology & Learning in its 1997-98 software awards for educational games aged at children between 8 and 12.
