= Unnatural Selection (video game) =

1993 video game

- Developer: Maxis
- Publisher: Maxis
- Platform: MS-DOS
- Release: WW: 1993

Unnatural Selection is a video game developed and published by Maxis. It was released in 1993 for MS-DOS.

== Gameplay ==
The player breeds mutant animals to fight battles. The game has two phases, the first is the breeding phase in which the player uses various objects and methods (food, drugs, radiation) to breed the animals which will fight future battles. The second is the battle phase in which the animals are deployed on the battlefield in order to combat those of a rogue scientist.

== Reception ==
Reception

Review scores
Publication	Score
Computer Gaming World	3.5 out of 5
Electronic Entertainment	7 out of 10

InfoWorld in December 1993 approved of the colorful, cartoonish animation, but said that "the game gets old rather quickly", with inadequate documentation. The magazine recommended Unnatural Selection to "those who have always wanted to play the part of a mad scientist". A 1994 Computer Gaming World survey of strategic space games set in the year 2000 and later gave the game three-plus stars out of five, stating that it was "A different concept, almost carried off with success".
