= SimsVille =

Cancelled video game developed by Maxis

- Promotional trailer
- Developer: Maxis
- Publisher: Electronic Arts
- Producer: Christine McGavran
- Platform: Microsoft Windows
- Release: Cancelled
- Genre: Life simulation

SimsVille is a cancelled life simulation video game developed by Maxis. The game was conceived as a hybrid between the gameplay of The Sims, a social simulation game, and the city-building game SimCity. Development of SimsVille was undertaken over two years by the Maxis development team for SimCity in an attempt to expand The Sims franchise. Following delays to the game's release window, Maxis discontinued development of SimsVille in September 2001, citing concerns with the quality of the gameplay experience. Despite its cancellation, design elements of SimsVille would influence later Maxis products, such as the community features of The Sims: Hot Date and the integration of Sims into SimCity 4.

== Gameplay ==
The promotional trailer of Simsville depicted Sims moving around the city.

SimsVille was a city-building and life simulation game where players were tasked with populating and managing a town. In contrast to gameplay in SimCity, which focuses only on city-building mechanics, homes in Simsville would be inhabited by households of Sims, who moved between and interacted with buildings in the city. Players were required to build and manage a city that met the needs of individual Sims by satisfying their 'Energy', 'Fun', 'Environment', 'Social' and 'Hunger' moods, as well as individual interests, that would affect the environment and character of the city. Similar to The Sims, the game's gameplay modes were separated by a 'Build Mode', which allowed players to construct buildings and infrastructure, a 'Buy Mode', in which players could purchase items that affect Sim needs and interests, and a 'Live Mode' to indirectly control Sims. The game supported a three-dimensional engine, allowing players to freely rotate and zoom into details in their town. Whilst players would not have had direct control over individual Sims, it was intended players would be able to design families or import households from The Sims to appear in the game.

== Development ==
Developed over a two-year period to its cancellation in September 2001, SimsVille was conceived out of early conceptual work during development by the Maxis team responsible for the SimCity series, and The Sims codesigners Claire Curtain and Roxy Wolosenko, with minor input from franchise creator Will Wright. SimsVille was intended as a hybrid between the simulation gameplay of The Sims and the city-building mechanics of the Sim City series. The development team aimed to bridge these gameplay approaches through expressing the impact of Sims and communities on the character of the environment. SimsVille was developed in parallel with other products that aimed to innovate and expand upon The Sims franchise, including The Sims Online. The 3D engine for SimsVille was developed from the ground-up and did not use code from SimCity 3000 or The Sims. Originally slated for a May 2001 release, publishers later expected the release of the game to occur as early as January or February 2002. In May 2001, Electronic Arts showcased previews of gameplay of SimsVille from multiple booths at E3, with its content observed by PC PowerPlay to have "progressed considerably" from the previous year.

=== Cancellation ===
On 21 September 2001, development of SimsVille was cancelled, with staff redeployed to progress The Sims Online and SimCity 4. Maxis stated the cancellation was made by the studio due to quality control issues, citing team and studio concerns with the "less compelling" play experience once cities were constructed. Maxis denied the cancellation related to conflicts with projects with The Sims Online and Hot Date, although the studio recognised Hot Date provided a "more fun" manifestation of the design objectives of SimsVille. The cancellation announcement was met with mixed reception. Eurogamer expressed skepticism for the stated reasons for abandoning the game due to the abundance of "commercial and critical flops" in the studio's history, with PC Zone speculating that the game was "too closely positioned" to ongoing projects for SimCity and The Sims Online. Maxis director Patrick Buechner estimated that SimsVille was "about 60 percent compete" and anticipating a March 2002 release at the time of cancellation.

== Legacy ==
Despite its cancellation, staff involved with SimsVille embedded the design of the game into future projects. The focus on the broader neighborhood was introduced into The Sims with The Sims: Hot Date expansion pack in 2001, and later iterations of The Sims mainline games. In a retrospective assessment, Computer Gaming World noted that the Hot Date expansion better accomplished the primary goal of allowing sims to leave their homes, a likely reason for the cancellation of SimsVille. Several of the concepts in SimsVille also appeared in the 2003 Maxis game SimCity 4, including the interface design, the integration of Sims in cities with simplified personality features, and the changing appearance of lots to reflect the character of a neighborhood. Dan Whitehead of Eurogamer raised comparisons between SimsVille and the design of the 2007 game SimCity Societies, a title that similarly attempted to introduce new gameplay mechanics in the SimCity franchise including aspects of social simulation.
