= SimIsle: Missions in the Rainforest =

1995 video game

- Developer: Intelligent Games
- Publisher: Maxis
- Designers: Matthew Stibbe; Simon Parkinson
- Programmers: Richard Groves; Simon Parkinson
- Artist: Dee Jarvis
- Writers: Mark Giles; Lawrence Miles
- Composer: Harry Holmwood
- Series: Sim
- Platforms: MS-DOS, Windows, Mac OS
- Release: DOS; 1995; Windows, Mac OS; July 10, 1996
- Genre: Construction and management simulation
- Mode: Single-player

SimIsle: Missions in the Rainforest is a 1995 simulation video game developed by Intelligent Games and published by Maxis.

== Gameplay ==
The player chooses one of several dozen fictional tropical archipelago islands of various shapes and sizes to simulate. The islands have varying amounts of open plains, forests, mountains, natural resources, and native peoples. The amount of pre-developed land also varies but most of the islands are largely nondeveloped when a new simulation begins. Each scenario has objectives and win/lose conditions. Each map can be started with the scenario objectives turned on or off, and the simulation can continue in free form after successfully completing the initial task.

The game engine has a passing similarity to that of SimCity 2000. For example, the island maps are projected isometrically and can be rotated in 90° intervals. However, the terrain graphics are more sophisticated than Sim City 2000.

In similar Maxis titles, player actions, such as placing buildings, are completed instantaneously. SimIsle is instead played through the hiring of intermediary agents. The agents have varying skills and profiles, and take varying amounts of time to complete each project.

=== Human Resources (HQ) ===
The agents are managed through the Agent HQ, which appears on every map. Each isle comes with a number of pre-selected agents. Others can be hired using the Agent HQ facility. Agents can be fired or trained while they are stationed at the Agent HQ. Each agent usually has two skills (such as Construction, Industry, Flora and Forestry, Exploration, Local Culture, Negotiation, Employment, or Criminal Contacts). Some assignments require more than one skill; if a single agent doesn't have all the necessary talents, two or more agents can be used to finish the task. An agent's skill set also determines where the agent is allowed to move on the map. For example, agents with the "Exploration" skill are allowed to move onto jungle squares and may discover hidden objects in doing so. It's not possible to train agents in new skills, but they can be trained to increase the effectiveness of the skills they already have.

=== Economics ===
SimIsle has its own currency, known as the EMU, or Ecological Monetary Unit. Each island has varying deposits of natural resources such as lumber, coal, gold, iron, and oil which can be gathered by building an appropriate facility (such as a mine, logging camp, or oil rig) on a tile which contains the resource. Once the facility is built, it operates more or less autonomously and will produce the specified resource at a rate determined by various factors including the richness of the deposit in that area.

Food and unskilled labor are supplied by the native villages dotted across each island. Initially, the native villages have low populations and are only capable of producing enough food to support the lone settlement. Agents with the appropriate skills can be sent to the villages to train them, which increases their ability to produce food. This in turn allows the village population to increase. The additional villagers can then be used to found new villages or act as an unskilled labor pool. The surplus food produced can be used to support populations in towns and cities (which are built by the player) which can then be used to obtain skilled labor. The native population has a happiness level that can be adversely affected by environmental conditions or by drawing too many unskilled laborers. Unhappy villages will sometimes start growing narcotics, which can be exploited for profit using an agent with the Criminal Contacts skill.

Most extraction facilities require unskilled labor to build them. Other facilities can then be built to produce lower-end goods that can be sold for profit, used in cities or used as part of the supply line in building higher end goods. The various facilities in this supply chain are connected by roads built automatically.

An AI manages what resources are distributed where and one of the challenges of the game is balancing supply with demand. In most cases, it is possible to simply buy equipment and goods needed to jumpstart production or build new facilities, but this is not effective in the long haul since it is expensive and must be performed manually by the player. Idle facilities that are starved because resources are not distributed to them or simply because none are available can become quite costly. Most resource deposits do not provide infinite supplies, which means most supply chains cannot function without player interaction forever nor can a single simulation indefinitely support heavy industry.

Various facilities can be created that bring tourism to the island such as airports and ferries. They act in a manner similar to other resource facilities like mines (although the "used up" tourists are returned, unlike mines). The next facility in the tourism supply line is tourist accommodations which can be upgraded both in size and quality and produce income. From there tourists will visit tourist attractions that can be built or discovered in the jungles by using an Agent with the exploration skill. Attractions not built by the player often have to be opened to the public explicitly and then upgraded before they become effective in drawing tourists.

== Development ==
SimIsle was developed by Intelligent Games, a London-based development company founded by Matthew Stibbe. Stibbe stated the game was originally conceived as Eden and intended as a simulation of the rainforest, inspired by a friend who had prepared a university report on the rainforests of Borneo. With the assistance of graphic designer Richard Evans, Stibbe developed the concept for the game as Sim Rainforest, which was successfully proposed to Maxis and renamed as SimIsle. Stibbe estimated development took place at a cost of US$400,000 over a period of 18 to 24 months. The game incorporated video and sound effects of rainforests from the CNN program Network Earth. Stibbe recounted that SimIsle "sold pretty well", and that he received royalties from sales of the game.

== Reception ==
Reception

Review scores
Publication	Score
AllGame	2.5/5
Computer Gaming World	4/5
GameSpot	7.7/10
Next Generation	2/5

SimIsle received average reviews upon release.
