= The Sims Mobile =

2018 mobile game

- Developers: Maxis (2017–2019); Firemonkeys Studios (2019–2020); Slingshot (2020–2026)
- Publisher: Electronic Arts
- Series: The Sims
- Platforms: iOS, Android
- Release: WW: March 6, 2018
- Genre: Social simulation game
- Modes: Single-player, multiplayer

The Sims Mobile was a life simulation game based on The Sims 4 for Android and iOS, published by Electronic Arts and initially developed by Maxis. It was announced on May 9, 2017, and was released on March 6, 2018. It featured a multiplayer component and includes story elements.

On January 29, 2024, EA announced that The Sims Mobile would no longer receive new events or content updates, but instead receive re-runs of past updates and events, while the online servers would remain active.

The game was delisted from the Apple App Store and Google Play Store on October 21, 2025. All Create-a-sim content and Build mode content was released on January 6th, 2026. Players who downloaded the game before this date were able to play the game until the servers shut down on January 20, 2026.

== Gameplay ==
In The Sims Mobile, players were able to create unique Sims with the in-game character creator (Create-a-Sim), build houses, start families and control the lives of their Sims. The game introduces multiplayer elements, as players can 'interact with other players' Sims by attending their parties, tapping on an NPC (non-playable character), or rating their Sims as through a sticker system.

Similarly to previous mobile games in The Sims franchise, energy was used when players took actions with their Sims. Energy could be restored through SimCash, which was earned through in-game quests and micro-transactions. SimCash can also be used to purchase certain premium clothing and furniture options in the game.

Unlike its predecessor The Sims FreePlay, The Sims Mobile offered a closer experience to the PC series of games. There was a focus on telling stories through Sim's actions, chosen by the player as their Sims go through their career or make relationships. As Sims play through these stories, they were able to level up and unlock new cutscenes. Advancing stories also unlocked new furniture or clothing items.

== Release ==
On May 9, 2017, the game was available for testing on the App Store and Google Play in Brazil. On March 6, 2018, The Sims Mobile was launched worldwide, but Hong Kong, mainland China and other parts of Asia were not open for download.

In 2019, development was transferred from Maxis to Firemonkeys Studios, which also develops The Sims FreePlay.

== Reception ==
The Sims Mobile received "Mixed or average reviews" from critics, holding an aggregated Metacritic score of 73/100.

Common Sense Media gave the game 3/5 stars, describing it as an "Energy-based life sim" that is "progress purchase-dependent". The Verge praised the game, declaring: "Maxis has successfully pared down a very full series into an accessible, easy-to-play game for your commute or bedtime routine". Kotaku complimented the timer and energy meters and praised the relationship mechanic. Shacknews criticized the timers and the micro-transactions, saying : "As it stands, unless you're really jonesing for a Sims fix while on the go, there isn't much of a reason to let The Sims Mobile insult you by peppering you with its seemingly endless barrage of microtransactions".

Upon its release, it topped the App Store. During its four months release, it generated a total of US$15 million. As of July 2018, the game generated between US$20 million and US$25 million.

=== Awards ===
The game was nominated for "Outstanding Video Game" at the 30th GLAAD Media Awards.
