= Spore Creature Creator =

- Developer: Maxis
- Publisher: Electronic Arts
- Designer: Will Wright
- Platforms: Microsoft Windows, Mac OS X
- Release: NA: June 17, 2008; EU: June 27, 2008
- Genre: Character editor
- Mode: Single-player

The Spore Creature Creator is a software that allows players to create their own creatures with a standalone version of the Creature Editor from Spore; the software was one of the first aspects of the game to receive focused development, and underwent ten rewrites since the start of development. It was rated E by the ESRB in early March 2008, indicating that the editor would be released separately well before the game's release as a utility program. Electronic Arts told MTV Asia that "EA Screen will provide visitors a chance to interact with EA's game producers hailing from the studios, and unveil the hugely anticipated SPORE Creature Creator demo version to gamers for the first time in Asia." Electronic Arts VP Patrick Buechner stated on the Spore Facebook page that the editor would be released in June or July 2008, saying, "We are looking at releasing it two to three months before the launch of the full game."

The SimCity Box artwork showed a blurb stating that the creature editor would be included with it. IGN revealed that the Spore Creature Creator utility would be available in two different versions on June 17, 2008. There was a paid version (for $9.95) and a free demo that was downloadable from Spore.com and included for free, bundled with The SimCity Box. The free version of the editor only contained 25% of the available creature parts that were found within the full version. In Australia, on August 30, 2008, three state newspapers owned by News Limited offered the full version either free or for $2.

The utility includes a test environment for players to see their creatures go through animations and allowed the player to import other user-created creatures through the Sporepedia at Spore.com. The utility included screen capture and video tools as well, including YouTube functionality. The editor also gave the user the ability to create animated avatars, and output in RSS and embeddable HTML code to facilitate easy incorporation into such sites as MySpace and Facebook. The software is automatically superseded by Spore when it is installed, since the Creature editor is already present on the game.

Shortly after its introduction, the Creature Creator was used to create creatures with oversized genitalia, either stand-alone or engaged in coitus (a phenomenon quickly dubbed "sporn"). EA responded with e-mails sent to those who made pornographic machinima from its demo, and has flagged certain on-line accounts for "TOS violations". Furthermore, YouTube pulled several such videos for violations of its own TOS.

By June 24, 2008, users had already uploaded over one million creatures to the site. During Electronic Arts' E3 2008 presentation on July 14, 2008, Wright humorously noted that fans had done God's work at 38% efficiency by creating the same number of currently known species on Earth, 1,589,000, in about 18 days, compared to God's 6 days. When Spore debuted on September 1, 2008, over 3 million creatures had been added to the Sporepedia via the Spore Creature Creator.

When installing Spore, Spore Creature Creator would be uninstalled.

== Reception ==
Reception

Aggregate score
Aggregator	Score
Metacritic	83/100

Review scores
Publication	Score
Eurogamer	9/10
PC Gamer (UK)	90%
VideoGamer.com	8/10
Common Sense Media	4/5 stars

At the time of its release, the game received "favorable" reviews according to the review aggregation website Metacritic.
