= Darkspore =

2011 video game

- Developer: Maxis Emeryville
- Publisher: Electronic Arts
- Director: Thomas Vu
- Producer: Thomas Vu
- Designers: Paul Sottosanti; Fred Dieckmann
- Composer: Junkie XL
- Platform: Microsoft Windows
- Release: NA: April 26, 2011; EU: April 28, 2011
- Genre: Action role-playing
- Modes: Single-player, multiplayer

Darkspore was a 2011 video game that borrowed creature editing technology from Spore. It was described as "a fast-paced, science fiction action role-playing game in which the player battled across alien worlds to save the galaxy from the mutated forces of Darkspore". In addition to the creature editor, the game featured a unique squad-based mechanic, various multiplayer options, and a player versus player arena.

The game was released in North America on April 26, 2011, and in Europe on April 28, 2011, for Microsoft Windows. Darkspore's multiplayer servers were shut down permanently on March 1, 2016, making it unplayable due to its always-on DRM.

== Plot ==
The Crogenitors were a race of scientists that established a massive empire encompassing an entire galaxy. Many of them performed secret experiments on the populations they oversaw. Being masters of genetic manipulation, they used their knowledge to create a personal army of genetic heroes, called Living Weapons. However, the discovery of an experimental amino acid that bonds to DNA changes everything. Capable of achieving a millennium in terms of evolution in a matter of hours, it has an immense potential to manipulate life to levels never achieved before.

Unfortunately, E-DNA proves to be unstable. All of the test subjects who came in contact with it were transformed into uncontrollable genetic mutants soon named The Darkspore. Fearing these new creatures, the Crogenitors throw hero Xylan into exile for his behavior and negligence, outlawing the use of E-DNA. Xylan fakes his death. Believing himself able to control the power of E-DNA, he injects it himself. This act transforms him into the Corruptor—a mentally unstable, extraordinarily powerful mutant who can master all Darkspores. Determined to get revenge on the other Crogenitors and conquer everything, he gathers allies and strengthens the E-DNA mutagenic power. Afterwards, the Corruptor begins conquering planets of the Crogenitor empire, infecting them through the use of E-DNA bombs, and destroying Crogenitor fortresses with his mutants and war machines.

As the game begins, the player takes on the role of one of the last Crogenitors. Starting with only a few heroes, the player's goal is to purge the Darkspore from the galaxy, planet by planet, moving ever closer to the ultimate goal of destroying the Corruptor forces.

== Hero Editor ==
The Hero editor in Darkspore has been described as an enhanced version of the one found in Spore, with thousands of parts to collect. The parts allow the customization of several character aspects, including body parts, armor, weapons, facial features and coloration by spending DNA as a currency. DNA helixes can be collected during gameplay from Darkspores or destructible objects, or obtained by selling pieces of loot.

== Development ==
Darkspore was developed by Maxis, being the first game they made after Will Wright departed the company. After an internal Spore technology review, the developers were closely surveying the comments left on the forums. Ultimately, their decision was to build up a game that is centered around different creatures fighting together, with co-op gameplay getting the main focus. The fundamentals found in Spore allowed for very quick prototypes, and the team became aware that action RPG was very suitable for the technology. Maxis added "spore" to the title as a homage to the technology that was running it, but the main idea was to create a standalone work that wouldn't be viewed as an expansion pack nor a sequel to Spore. The early designs were inspired by Magic the Gathering and Pokémon Trading Card Game, and the developers thought they needed someone with an experience in that segment, which led to hiring Paul Sottosanti, a designer from Wizards of the Coast. A team formed of 40 people included the people that worked on previous Maxis games, along with several freelancers.

In addition to a product key registration, Darkspore required a persistent, broadband internet connection and an EA account in order to play the game after installation.

In June 2013 many users had problems logging in to play. This combined with Darkspore being removed from Steam led to concerns that EA had abandoned the title and it would no longer be playable. However, shortly after, the errors were fixed and Darkspore returned to Steam.

=== Server closure ===
The online servers of the game were shut down permanently on March 1, 2016. The move attracted criticism, with Techraptor stating that the failure to migrate away from the always-online requirement before the server shut down was tantamount to "banishing the title from gaming history". Kotaku noted that Darkspore "revealed just how harmful DRM can be for games and their consumers".

== Alternate reality game ==
HelpEDNA was a Darkspore alternate reality game that went online in mid-2010. It plays out as a puzzle text adventure which gives clues about the Darkspore game, and is set before the events of the game.

HelpEDNA is a puzzle text adventure, in which the player is a contact that has begun receiving messages from an unknown character. After the game is completed, it contains an epilogue page containing a message from Maxis, with links to all the pictures and videos from the website.

== Reception ==
Darkspore received mixed reviews, with an average of 65% on Metacritic.
