= Maxis =

American video game developer

- Logo used since 2022
- Type: Subsidiary
- Industry: Video games
- Founded: 1987; 39 years ago
- Founders: Will Wright; Jeff Braun
- Headquarters: Redwood City, California, US
- Key people: Catharina Lavers Mallet; (general manager)
- Products: The Sims series (2000–present); SimCity series (1989–2014); Sim series (1989–2010); Spore (2008); Darkspore (2011)
- Parent: Electronic Arts (1997–present)
- Subsidiaries: Maxis Europe; Maxis Texas
- Website: ea.com/maxis

Maxis is an American video game developer of Electronic Arts (EA). The studio was founded in 1987 by Will Wright and Jeff Braun, and acquired by Electronic Arts in 1997. Maxis is best known for its simulation games, including The Sims, Spore, and SimCity.

== History ==
=== Independent studio (1987–1997) ===
Former logo of Maxis used until 2012

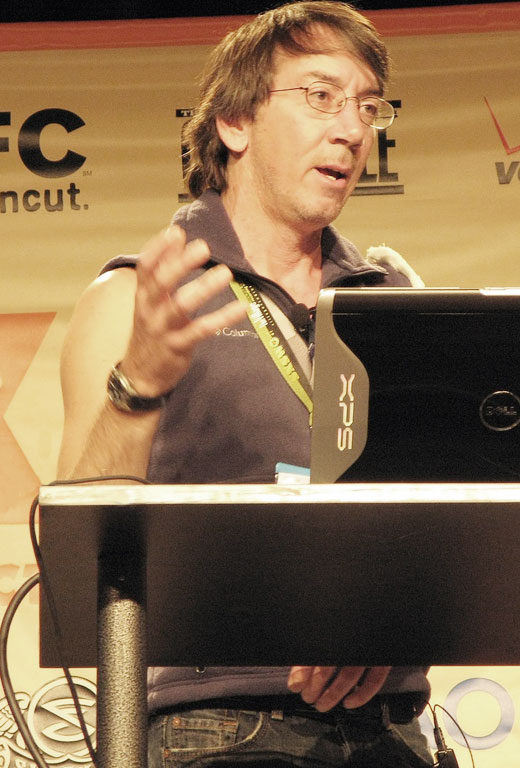
Will Wright, Maxis co-founder

Maxis was founded in 1987 by Will Wright and Jeff Braun to help publish SimCity on home computers. Before then, the game was only available on a limited basis on the Commodore 64 due to few publishers showing any interest in porting a non-traditional game without definite "win" and "lose" conditions. The title went on to become one of the most popular and successful video games of all time. The SimCity series became a staple for the company and spawned multiple sequels and spin-offs. To name the company, Braun required that the name was "from 5–7 letters, mean nothing, be easy to remember and contain an x, z, or q"; the name "Maxis" was presented by Braun's father. Following the broad success of SimCity 2000, Maxis moved from Orinda, California, to Walnut Creek in 1994.

One of the unintended successes of SimCity was recognition of the means to gamify the intersection of multiple real-world systems that could be used for planning and development, such as using SimCity-type simulations for urban planning. Around 1992, Maxis was approached by corporations and government agencies who wanted the company to use the same system simulation principles of SimCity to develop non-game simulations that they could manipulate for similar planning purposes. To support this, Maxis bought a small company, Delta Logic, and its owner John Hiles, who had been focused on more immediate business simulation software, and rebranded it as Maxis Business Simulations (MBS) for this work. Among works developed under this included SimRefinery for the Chevron Corporation, and SimHealth for the Markle Foundation. In 1994, Maxis decided to let this division go on its own; MBS rebranded itself as Thinking Tools Inc. and continued to produce similar simulation tools, but eventually closed down in 1998. Most of the information on MBS and Thinking Tools has been lost as upon being told of the company's closure, the few remaining employees burned most of the company's archives and only remnants of MBS' output exists.

In what Kotaku later referred to as the "era of scattergun experimentation", Maxis released numerous titles throughout the 1990s, including "sim" titles as well as some non-simulation titles, such as RoboSport (1991) and 3D Pinball for Windows (1995), which was included as one of the standard system games in several Windows releases; however, these newer games were not successful. On June 1, 1995, Maxis became a public company. Heavy losses and lack of direction led Maxis to begin considering acquisition offers.

=== Early years under Electronic Arts (1997–2006) ===
In 1997, Maxis agreed to be acquired by Electronic Arts by means of a stock swap which valued Maxis at $125 million. In a press release, Maxis stated it agreed to the acquisition in order to take advantage of Electronic Arts' strong distribution channel. The transaction was complete on July 28, 1997, and triggered major changes at the company. Jeff Braun left, having received a sizable amount of money during the purchase, and nearly half of the Maxis staff were laid off.

Over 1998, Maxis was allowed to finish SimCity 3000 on its own time; following this, Wright's efforts were thrown into The Sims, at the time seen as a major gamble for the company, as the dollhouse game was not seen as a match for the video game market's demographics. EA backed the title on the basis of the economic potential for expansion releases. In 2000, Maxis South (Austin, Texas) was closed. The Sims was released in February 2000 to widespread success, and would become one of Maxis' core focuses until a 2006 reorganization shifted it away from its core team. SimCity 4 was released in 2003, the first title in the series to implement true 3D, as well as the first where Wright was not directly involved with work. In 2004, Maxis' longtime studios in Walnut Creek were closed, and the staff moved to EA offices in Redwood City and Emeryville.

=== Spore and SimCity reboot (2006–2014) ===
Second logo of Maxis used until 2022

As The Sims became a steady success, Will Wright began to focus on Spore. The three years between its public announcement and its release were protracted enough to attract use of the term "vaporware" by some, and upon its 2008 release, found itself subject to harsh criticism and the target of a consumer protest against Electronic Arts. Despite the poor launch publicity, Spore sold 1 million units in its first month.

Will Wright left Maxis in 2009, with Maxis going on to produce the poorly received spinoff Darkspore in 2011. During this time, Maxis.com redirected to the Spore website, then later once more to the website for The Sims. At the 2012 Game Developers Conference, EA announced a new SimCity along with a new logo for the Maxis brand. Maxis became one of four primary labels at EA, replacing the "EA Play" brand. A Mobile focused Maxis studio was opened in Helsinki by EA in 2012. Development of The Sims continued, and Maxis branding returned in 2013 with the launch of The Sims 3: University Life, and SimCity. While Maxis were focusing on graphical improvements with the SimCity reboot, EA wanted to make the game multiplayer and always-online, in part to combat piracy. The game was subject to "one of the most disastrous launches in history", as the game was released in a highly buggy state, with server failures plaguing players, and the open regions swiftly filling with abandoned cities. Maxis would continue to support the game with patches, but it remained buggy even a year after launch. The reboot effectively ended the SimCity franchise, and was the last game to be developed by Maxis' core location in Emeryville.

=== Studio closures and layoffs (2014–2019) ===
In the wake of the SimCity launch, Maxis went through a series of layoffs and studio closures, which continued throughout the late 2010s. This began with the 2014 restructure of EA Salt Lake, dissolving the Maxis group that had been headquartered there. A number of Maxis devs were migrated to the Redwood Shores studio. Maxis' principal studio in Emeryville was closed in 2015, leaving only the smaller Redwood Shores team and a newly opened mobile developer in Helsinki under the Maxis name.

In September 2015, EA announced that the consolidated Maxis team would work alongside the EA Mobile division under Samantha Ryan. EA indicated that the "collaboration" would still see most of Maxis' future products available for personal computers. The group was then reorganized under EA Worldwide Studios in 2016, with the rest of Salt Lake shut down in 2017. Redwood Shores faced further layoffs in 2018, which included 15-20 Maxis staff. Development of The Sims Mobile was relocated away from the remaining Maxis developers in 2019, with Firemonkeys taking over. This left continued support for The Sims 4 as the sole Maxis-fronted project at EA.

The closure of Emeryville in particular—as Maxis' long-lived core location—was described by commentators as the end of Maxis as it had been known in the past, with only the brand name persisting.

=== New studios under the Maxis brand (2019–present) ===
EA announced two new studios that would bear the Maxis name over the following years – Maxis Texas in 2019 and Maxis Europe in 2021. The announcements only came in the form of job postings on the EA careers website. The Texas team was set up at the existing EA offices in Austin to work on a new IP, while the Europe studio was created specifically to support The Sims 4. Unlike the Texas office, Maxis Europe is a "distributed development team", composed of staff working remotely.

The move came amid a number of job postings at the Redwood Shores studio for a new The Sims title, as well as EA CEO Andrew Wilson hinting at an online multiplayer-focused iteration of the franchise. In 2021, EA reaffirmed its commitment to long-term support for The Sims 4, citing a "shift across the entire games industry to support and nurture our communities long-term".

== Notable games ==
Maxis is regarded for its innovative simulation games, in which there is no specific goal to the player, making its games almost endless.

=== SimCity series ===
SimCity, released in 1989, was Maxis' first release. The player is a mayor that may, at their leisure, take a city from a single village to a successful metropolis, laying down zones, taking care of the public services and stimulating the city's economy. The series includes six main games (SimCity, SimCity 2000, SimCity 3000, SimCity 4, SimCity Societies and SimCity) and three spin-offs, Sim City: The Card Game, SimCopter and Streets of SimCity. SimCity Societies, the fifth main release, was not produced by Maxis, but by Tilted Mill Entertainment, being described as a 'social engineering simulator' and criticized for the lack of SimCity's traditional formula. In 2013, Maxis Emeryville released a reboot, simply titled SimCity, to mixed reviews, due to technical issues at launch surrounding its mandatory online connectivity. TrackTwenty (formerly Maxis Helsinki) developed SimCity: BuildIt in 2014.

=== The Sims ===
Maxis' most successful series to date and one of the best-selling PC games of all time is The Sims (2000). Maxis has developed seven expansion packs for the game, as well as an online spin-off titled The Sims Online. Maxis released The Sims 2 in 2004, a sequel title that features a full 3D environment, as opposed to the original's dimetric engine. From 2006 to 2013, all The Sims games and expansion packs were developed by The Sims Studio, and the Maxis logo was not included on The Sims game covers until 2013, with the release of The Sims 3: University Life. On May 6, 2013, it was announced that Maxis would be developing The Sims 4, and the game was released internationally in September 2014. Maxis also developed The Sims Mobile, until development was transferred to Firemonkeys in February 2019.

=== Spore ===
Spore was released in September 2008. Players create species starting at the single cell level, and develop them into sentient life. The goal is for them to eventually gain the intelligence to create spaceships. The Spore Creature Creator allows users to create species for later use in the game. This is one of few Maxis' games to feature goals on its plot as the player must complete five different phases and reach the space-traveling technology. There is also an ultimate goal, which is entering the galactic core, a massive black hole surrounded by a powerful and hostile cyborg species called the Grox; however, the player can stay in a single phase as long as they wish, even after completing it. The game received a critic score of 84% on Metacritic, indicating generally positive reviews from critics. Electronic Arts confirmed the production of expansion packs due to Spore's financial success, later releasing Spore Galactic Adventures in 2009, as well as several spin-offs such as Darkspore.

== See also ==
- List of Sim video games
- List of Maxis games
