= Development of Spore =

Spore is a video game developed by Maxis and designed by Will Wright, released in September 2008. The game has drawn wide attention for its ability to simulate the development of a species on a galactic scope, using its innovation of user-guided evolution via the use of procedural generation for many of the components of the game, providing vast scope and open-ended gameplay.

Spore is a god game. The player molds and guides a species across many generations, growing it from a single-celled organism into a more complex animal. Eventually, the species becomes sentient. The player then begins molding and guiding this species' society, developing it into a space-faring civilization, at which point they can explore the galaxy in a space ship. Spore's main innovation is the use of procedural generation for many of the components of the game, providing vast scope and open-endedness. Wright said, "I didn't want to make players feel like Luke Skywalker or Frodo Baggins. I wanted them to be like George Lucas or J. R. R. Tolkien." During the 2007 Technology Entertainment Design (TED) conference, Wright added that he wanted to create a "toy" for kids to inspire long-term thinking, stating, "I think toys can change the world."

== History and development ==
Spore was originally conceived as SimEverything in 1994 as seen in this early poster.

Spore was originally a working title, suggested by Maxis developer Ocean Quigley, for the game which was first referred to by the general public as SimEverything. Even though SimEverything was a first choice name for Wright, the title Spore stuck. Wright adding it also freed him from the preconceptions another Sim title would have brought, saying "...Not putting 'Sim' in front of it was very refreshing to me. It feels like it wants to be breaking out into a completely different thing than what Sim was." Wright was inspired by the Drake equation and the 1977 film Powers of Ten when developing Spore.

Spore's development began in 2000, around the time that development began for The Sims Online. The earliest version was inspired by the SETI Project, as Wright admitted, "The original concept was sort of a toy galaxy you could fly around and explore." Spore's design documents were published in an issue of Wired in 2004 as a layout portraying the cycle of evolution, unbeknownst to the magazine and the general public at that time. At the 2005 Game Developers Conference (GDC), Spore was first revealed and demonstrated to the public during a speech on procedural generation.

It was officially unveiled two months later at E3 2005, the industry's annual trade show. GDC 2006 featured two Spore related talks, Building Community Around Pollinated Content in Spore and Spore: Preproduction Through Prototyping. A video released on YouTube shows "unedited footage of Spore that will be going to TV networks covering E3 2006", and includes an overhauled creature editor, a first look at the texturing tools, as well as glimpses at other aspects of the game. Such things were discussed on G4's Attack of the Show numerous times. Will Wright has said that the game was also influenced by many TV shows, films and toys, such as Lego and Star Wars. By E3 2007, the game's look had changed again, with major changes to the graphical style. The Sporepedia was inspired by Web 2.0.

Spore "comics" shown at GDC 2006

At the DICE Summit, Wright playfully introduced four designers according to their design team personas, dubbing designer and senior art director Quigley as The Scientist, Chaim Gingold as The Toymaker, Jenna Chalmers as The Mastermind, Alex Hutchinson as The Cowboy, and himself as The Traffic Cop. Quigley revealed at the Summit the difficulty of making the editors (the creature and vehicle editors in particular) extremely accessible, stating it was like "art directing a million incompetents... [Gamers] don't have good sense as to what makes a good character, so you have to put in all these techniques and tools, so when they do something, it looks good."

The New York Times reported a projected development cost of twenty million United States dollars on October 10, 2006.

In April 2007, Civilization IV lead designer Soren Johnson joined Maxis to work on Spore. Soon after, some video game sites theorized that this news indicated that the release of Spore might slip to 2008. A projected 2008 release was revealed three weeks later at an EA conference call, corroborating the speculation that a significant amount of development was still left to be completed. In a GameVideos interview with Garnett Lee, Wright explained, "I credit him with, basically, you know, being able to present [the Civilization phase] that has that many, ah, strategic possibilities but not have it being overwhelming from a gameplay mechanic sense."

By July 2007, the game was a complete, fully featured alpha build undergoing closed play testing. On August 23, 2007, a closed door demonstration of a playable build was featured at Games Convention 2007 in Leipzig, Germany.

At the 2008 DICE Summit, Electronic Arts CEO John Ricitiello stated, "It's probably the greatest creative risk maybe going on in the game industry today...I believe it's going to be one of the greatest franchises in our industry and will rival World of Warcraft or The Sims or Rock Band. It's going to be right up there."

Promotion and advertising were ramped up in May and June 2008, as the YouTube Spore channel opened, new trailers focusing on each phase along with developer interviews were released, and the Creature Creator was released, allowing players to upload their creations to the revamped official site.

Will Wright announced at E3 2008 that National Geographic would produce a television documentary on Spore, as scientists use the game to explain real-life biological, physical, and evolutionary science. This documentary would later be included with Spore: Galactic Edition. He also announced a partnership with SETI, taking part in the Celebrating Science 2008 activity on July 16, 2008, where Spore betas were available for play.

On August 14, 2008, Spore was declared to have gone gold.

=== Gameplay changes ===
The gameplay itself had numerous changes during development. The most striking was the shift in realism, from the gritty depiction of cellular and animal life in the GDC 2005 debut, to the current iteration of a more round, softer edged depiction of the creatures. The most visible change was in the cellular phase, which transformed the unicellular organisms into strange insects with cartoonish, human-like eyes, which were used "to make it cute", according to Wright during the 2007 TED seminar. According to Wright, the Spore development team was broken into two camps, the "Cute" camp that wanted to skew the game's focus towards a The Sims-type of game, and the "Science" camp that wanted to keep the game as realistic as possible. The final version was more or less a compromise between the two; Wright stated, "We ended up with a very nice balance of the two factors."

Another constantly changing aspect was the number of phases in the game. Initially, in 2005, the game consisted of seven phases: Cell, Underwater, Creature, Tribe, City, Civilization and Space. During the annual Academy of Interactive Arts & Sciences DICE Summit on February 7, 2007, a slide was displayed (see image, right) which listed a total of eight phases. The Underwater phase had been removed, and Molecular was added (which was likened to Tetris). Furthermore, the Space phase was split into Terraform and Galactic phases; terraforming represented a limited form of power to slowly change planets within one's own system, whilst the galactic phase represented a more god-like power upon the acquisition of the interstellar space drive: being able to travel outside of one's solar system. The 2007 TED seminar in March 2007 displayed only five phases. The Molecular and Cellular phases had been condensed into one Cell phase. The City stage had been removed, and from Wright's demonstration it appears that the stage has been assimilated into the start of the Civilization phase. Furthermore, the two last phases were condensed back into the single Space phase.

In Wright's 2005 demonstration, the creature with which he began looked remarkably similar to his earlier microbe. This led many people to believe that the creature was based upon the microbe's appearance. However, in a 2006 video from E3, narrated by a senior programmer, it was said that the player will initially begin as a slug-like animal. The narrator further stated the reason for this was to allow for more player creativity. This created uncertainty as to which method would be used in the final game; particularly as a later video demonstrated the essence of the cell creature emerging from a pond. The 2007 TED Presentation in March 2007 again depicted a legless, slug-like creature emerging from the water, leaving a trail of slime in its wake. The cellular phase was renamed as the tide pool phase, then called the cell phase months later. The final phases: Cell, Creature, Tribal, Civilization and Space were the five available stages at the final release of Spore.

Two notable locomotive abilities for the creatures were also the subject of speculation during the long development:

==== Flight ====
A flying creature was seen briefly in the GDC 2005 demo, but for a long time since that appearance, it was unknown whether it would be possible to make flying creatures in the game, though it is now known that it is. Many Maxis-developed default Spore creatures feature feathers and wings, and it is now known that they are functional and not simply decorative. Wing types include butterfly-like wings, as seen in the IGN Evolution video, bat-like wings, and bird-like wings. In a Gadgetoff 2007 seminar demonstration, Wright made a bird-like creature with large, feathered wings; but it only flapped its wings and did not fly. However, on February 13, 2008, a hands on preview revealed that wings still give creatures the ability of limited flight. The Creature Creator and subsequent videos revealed that creatures have a limited form of flight: gliding. A creature's ability to stay aloft was dependent on two factors: the jumping ability (to get in the air) and gliding ability (how slow the descent is).

==== Swimming ====
Similarly, the underwater phase featuring swimming creatures had vanished since its appearance in the original 2005 GDC demo, which led to fears that it may have been cut. However, in the July 2006 issue of PC Gamer (UK) their preview of Spore suggested that players would not only be able to create aquatic creatures, but would be able to develop them into a fully underwater civilization. More recently, in the SXSW 2007 demo, each phase has a mentioned text goal on the screen and the stated goal of the tide pool phase is "become large enough to move onto land", by implication omitting a creature-underwater phase. The opening Flash player cinematic of the official site does feature underwater evolution of a creature, so it is possible that the underwater phase is simply a part of the larger tide pool phase.

During the SXSW 2007 demo, Will Wright said that the underwater phase was on the verge of being cut out. However, he has also said that, if cut, underwater civilizations would be one of the first things to add via an expansion pack. Though the final version of Spore released to stores had indeed proven the underwater phase had been cut, it is still possible for the player's creature to swim above water. If the player swim too far into the sea, then they get eaten by a sea monster, which is probably the present-game Maxis creature, Battered Feesh.

=== Release date delays ===
The game had undergone numerous delays to its release date throughout its development, having appeared at three straight E3 shows with the promise of a release that year.

On May 8, 2007, Electronic Arts CEO John Riccitiello said that the release of Spore is "right on the bubble with Q4 [January–March 2008], if not, for Q1 fiscal 09 [April–June 2008]". CFO Warren Jenson stated that the game will not be included in the company's financial plan for its current fiscal year, which ends March 31, 2008. Later that year, on August 1, 2007, Riccitiello reaffirmed his previous statements in another conference call, saying the release "is sort of squarely targeted against March, April, May of next year", but cautioning that "intellectual properties like this and games like these are so large and so complex that we chose not to put it in our fiscal year guidance because these things are pretty hard to predict, and the outcomes can be volatile […] So our best guess right now is Q1 of next fiscal, but we're not actually providing guidance for next fiscal at this point." Maxis VP Patrick Beuchner revealed on July 10, 2007, during a G4TV interview that the Nintendo DS and mobile phone versions would ship the same day as the PC version. In October, Wright stated that Spore would be ready in roughly six months (around April 2008).

Wired News gave Spore the second place in its annual list of vaporware awards—that is, an award to projects that have been prolonged too much already.

Gamasutra reported on January 29, 2008, that Spore might be delayed until fall or winter 2008. Two days later, EA CEO John Riccitiello stated that Spore would be released sometime before the holidays.

On February 12, 2008, Electronic Arts announced in an official press release that the official release date would be September 5, 2008 for Europe and September 7, 2008, for North America. Later it was announced the full version of the game was due to be released on September 4, 2008, in Australia and Nordic regions, but Australian stores prematurely broke the street date on September 1, 2008.

=== Spore Creature Creator ===
The Spore Creature Creator was released several months before 'Spore's' release, which allowed users to create creatures for the game prior to its release.

=== Spore Comic Creator ===
The Spore team worked on a partnership with a comic creation software company to offer comic book versions of a personalized Spore story. Comic books with stylized pictures of various creatures, some whose creation has been shown in various presentations, can be seen on the walls of the Spore team's office. The utility was revealed at San Diego Comic-Con on July 24, 2008, as the Spore Comic Creator, which would use MashOn.com and its e-card software.

=== Platform announcements ===
Microsoft Windows, Nintendo DS and mobile phone versions of the game were initially confirmed.

Wright expressed the desire to release the game on other platforms, such as seventh generation consoles, the PlayStation Portable and the Apple Macintosh. In a GameSpy interview, Wright stated, "Well, actually we are going to go on all platforms, but we will come out on PC first. We will even come out on cell phones and stuff."

In a Videogamesblogger.com interview, Wright said that the game will take different forms on the different consoles. As for the Wii, Wright also said that it offers a lot of creative opportunities so the Wii may receive a different game. On October 26, 2007, Wright expressed a desire to develop for the Wii because the console was his "favorite platform" (though he did not elaborate any plans for a Wii version), in what was called an "off-the-cuff" statement; as of February 13, 2008, no official announcement from Electronic Arts has been forthcoming. In a February 12, 2008 interview with N'Gai Croal, Wright talked briefly about the Wii version and how they plan on making the Wii controller a factor in that version of the game. In addition, representatives by EA and Maxis confirmed in an interview that a Wii version of Spore was in the early design process.

Electronic Arts announced on January 15, 2008, that the Mac OS X version would be released on the same day as the PC version. The announcement was timed to coincide with the MacWorld Conference & Expo 2008, which showed Spore running on Macs.

On February 13, 2007, the Nintendo DS and mobile phone versions were revealed to be spinoffs of the main game to be released on the same day as the main version, and each focusing on a single phase of gameplay. The Nintendo DS version was titled Spore Creatures, a 2D story-based RPG based in the Creature phase in which the gamer plays a creature kidnapped by a UFO and forced to survive in a strange world, with elements of Nintendogs. The mobile phone version of Spore, called Spore Origins, was based on the tide pool phase, in which players try to survive as a multicellular organism, with gameplay similar to flOw. On March 6, 2008, an iPhone version was demonstrated at Apple's iPhone SDK press event, though there was no commitment to ship such a product given at that event. The iPhone-Spore demo made use of the device's touch capabilities and 3-axis accelerometer.

Electronic Arts confirmed on March 31, 2008, that Spore would be receiving post-release expansion packs. Only one expansion pack has been released, Spore Galactic Adventures. The expansion pack includes an adventure editor, as well as many new items and the ability for a player to go down to a planet's surface.

=== Special edition ===
On June 24, 2008, the Spore: Galactic Edition was announced. This special edition game is priced at $79.99, and includes a "Making of Spore" DVD video, a "How to Build a Better Being" DVD video, by National Geographic Channel (not included in all countries), a "The Art of Spore" hardback mini-book, a fold-out Spore poster and a 100-page Galactic Handbook.

== Procedural generation ==
Spore extensively uses procedural generation, rather than individual objects. Wright mentioned in an interview given at E3 2006 that the information necessary to generate an entire creature would be only a couple of kilobytes, according to Wright, who presented the following analogy: "think of it as sharing the DNA template of a creature while the game, like a womb, builds the 'phenotypes' of the animal, which represent a few megabytes of texturing, animation, etc."

In Spore, all creature animations are made on the fly. "The game automatically knows how to animate your creature based on how you put it together. For example, if you give your creature four equine legs, you can logically expect it to gallop around like a horse." This is untrue in the final game.

In Wright's first public demonstration of Spore, he created a tripedal reptilian creature in the creature editor (this creature was dubbed the Willosaur by fans, after Wright, and became one of the mascots for the game, appearing prominently in the game's first trailer.). The game then determined how a lizard with three legs and a prehensile tail should walk. Other animations of the lizard including hunting, eating, swimming, dragging objects, mating, playing a drum and dancing, all of which were procedurally generated based on the model that the player created. Wright then revealed several pre-made creatures which moved realistically, despite their exotic design: large, insectile creatures with multiple heads and six legs, Tweety Bird the SUV: a walking bird whose massive head caused it to tilt while turning, and a dog-like creature with a set of unusually branching limbs. Wright also humorously demonstrated a creature that looked like a Care Bear (claiming it would be a vicious carnivore), indicating that players could create animals similar to those found in nature or popular culture. This also applied to vehicles such as space ships, as demonstrated in the Gadgetoff video, in which Wright was seen piloting a UFO similar to the USS Enterprise.

Chris Hecker, who worked on Spore (including its early prototypes), gave a presentation at GDC 2005 and Futureplay entitled "Why you should have paid attention in multivariable calculus", in which he describes the mathematics of an implicit surface and various methods to apply texture projections to such surfaces. Sean O'Neil worked as a consultant for Maxis "to assist with R&D involving dynamic generation and rendering of a fractal-based world". He maintains a website with a demonstration of procedural planet generation and a simulation of dynamic atmospheric scattering.

Wright noted that he hired a handful of demoscene programmers and artists because of their familiarity with procedural generation. An example of software they used was ParticleMan, which simulated gravitational attraction between particles in a cloud, which would be incorporated into the space phase. It helped orchestrate such gravitational dynamics as orbits, nebula formation, star formation and particle streams from sources like pulsars and black holes. ParticleMan was developed internally at Maxis by Jason Shankel and uses the GLUT OpenGL app kit developed by Mark Kilgard and the GLUT-based GLUI UI library developed by Paul Rademacher.

The official site allows users to sample a number of Spore prototypes, which include ParticleMan, SPUG, City Maze, and other software, all under 1000KB in size, save the 20MB Space, and the 45mb Gonzago.

=== Technologies ===
Will Wright names the demoscene as a major influence on Spore, which is largely based on procedural content generation developed by many demoscene veterans. Specifically, as the demoscene was originally limited by the hardware and storage capabilities of their target machines (16/32 bit home computers such as the Atari ST and the Amiga ran on floppy disks), they developed intricate algorithms to produce large amounts of content from very little initial data. Wright showed pictures from demoparties like Assembly demo party to great applause at GDC 2005.

On August 9, 2007, SIGGRAPH 2007 featured a seminar titled Spor(T), including segments Player Driven Procedural Texturing, Creating Spherical Worlds, Fast Object Distribution, and Rigblocks: Player-Deformable Objects, given by Spore development team members Andrew Willmott, Ocean Quigley, Henry Goffin, Chris Hecker, Shalin Shodhan and David DeBry. Andrew Willmott has made available slides and videos from the seminar detailing the techniques.

Frank Gibeau, president of Electronic Arts' Games Label announced that Electronic Arts may use the underlying technology of Spore to develop eclectic software titles, such as action, real-time strategy and role-playing video games, focusing on player-creation concepts. Gibeau stated, "What's so beautiful about Spore is that it's extremely malleable... you could take it to different platforms, like (Web-page) flash games, the PlayStation 3, the Xbox 360, Nintendo's Wii. It really travels well to other platforms."

== Leaked prototype ==
On January 1, 2026, a group of people known as Hidden Palace published a build of Spore dated to February 19, 2008. The build has a big amount of bugs and debug tools, sometimes described as the "missing link" between the final game and the Creature Creator. Leaked version possesses several visible differences from the original, most major including the ability to change tribe colour in Tribal Stage, race of Grox being replaced by different species named "gRob", and fully accessible terrain editor - similar to what is presented in Galactic Adventures.

== Music ==
The music for the game was designed by Brian Eno, an artist famous for his work with ambient music. Eno has worked with Kent Jolly and Aaron McLeran to implement a simple piece of software in Spore called "The Shuffler", which procedurally generates fragments for the soundtrack from a number of samples, based on the programming language Pure Data. Eno appeared in the aforementioned June 2006 lecture to give a talk alongside Wright at the Long Now Foundation. In January 2007, Eno confirmed his involvement in a lecture given at the Berlin University of the Arts. Eno was involved with Wright and Spore at least as early as June 2006.

== See also ==
- Interactive skeleton-driven simulation
