= Spore Hero =

2009 video game

- Developer: EA Montreal
- Publisher: Electronic Arts
- Designer: Jean-François Roy
- Composer: Winifred Phillips
- Platform: Wii
- Release: NA: October 6, 2009; AU: October 8, 2009; UK: October 9, 2009
- Genre: Life simulation
- Modes: Single-player, multiplayer

Spore Hero is a 2009 action-adventure game developed by EA Montreal and published by Electronic Arts. It is a Wii spin-off of Spore in which the players focus on creativity and evolution using the controls of the Wii. The game was released in October 2009.

== Development ==
A Wii spinoff of the game had been mentioned by Will Wright several times, such as in his October 26, 2007, interview with The Guardian. Eventually, a spin-off under the title Spore Hero, an adventure game built ground up for the Wii with a heavier focus on evolution, was announced as part of the 2009 lineup along with Spore Hero Arena and Spore Galactic Adventures Concept art for the game was created by Mathieu Latour-Duhaime.

The first details of Spore Hero began to emerge when MTV's Totilo had an interview with designer Lucy Bradshaw. In it she said that the team was taking a look at Wii Motion Plus for better motion sensitivity. On May 12, EA sent out their official press release for Spore Hero and Spore Hero Arena. Several previews began to emerge later. At an event in Los Angeles, GameSpot got another look at Spore Hero. IGN and Gamezone also posted previews as part of their pre-E3 lineup. Spore Hero was on show at E3 2009 and at Comic-Con. In late July, Maxis conducted an interview with several of the major fansites. During it they revealed that one of the choices they made during development was to focus on the story-line of the game. This focus meant that they had to detract from the game's online capabilities.

== Gameplay ==
The protagonist is a blue creature from an egg inside a blue crystal meteor that crashed on the planet, along with other blue meteors that the player can destroy in order to gain blue meteor shards for evolving the player's character. The antagonist is a red creature named Zarkhathor, whose egg was inside a red crystal meteor. The player must do quests, fight, sing, dance, and pose with other creatures that are in "tribes" in order to earn creature parts, as well as dig creature parts up from dead creature carcasses that the player uses to evolve themselves in order for the game to progress. The main objective of the game is to go through five different stages, Mushroom Valley, The Ancient Grounds, Moonlit Stoneway, Moonlit Caverns, and Mushroom Grove, with The Ancient Grounds acting as a nexus between these stages. The player must find at least five different special creature parts for the Ancient Guardian, a statue of a creature that comes to life after all five parts are put on the creature. After the statue comes to life, it destroys the barrier between The Ancient Grounds and Creature Beach, the final stage of the game. In Creature Beach, the player has a final showdown with Zarkhathor after receiving a special part from the Ancient Guardian that allows the creature to shoot blue crystals out of its body at the enemy. The player enters the mouth of a gigantic octopus-like creature with a large, gaping mouth and a single eye, with many long tentacles going into and out of the ground of Creature Beach. After beating Zarkathor, the player gets to edit the Zarkathor creature to "not be a threat" anymore. After going back to the Ancient Grounds, the player learns that the ability that the special part they received has will no longer work.

== Reception ==
Reception

Aggregate score
Aggregator	Score
Metacritic	61%

Review scores
Publication	Score
Game Informer	7/10
IGN	6.1/10

IGN rated Spore Hero 6.1 out of 10 in its review. Game Informer rated the game a 7/10.
