= Impossible Creatures =

2003 video game

- Cover art featuring a tiger-headed scorpion
- Developer: Relic Entertainment
- Publisher: Microsoft Game Studios (Note: Published digitally by THQ Nordic as of 2015)
- Director: Alex Garden
- Producer: John Johnson
- Designers: Jay Wilson (lead); Quinn Duffy; Andrew Chambers; Damon Gauthier
- Programmer: Shane Alfreds
- Writers: Duane Pye; Jay Wilson
- Composer: Crispin Hands
- Platform: Windows
- Release: NA: January 7, 2003; EU: February 28, 2003
- Genre: Real-time strategy
- Modes: Single-player, multiplayer

Impossible Creatures is a 2003 steampunk real-time strategy game developed by Relic Entertainment and published by Microsoft Game Studios. Its unique feature is that the armies used in gameplay are all created by the player, and involve combining two animals to make a new super creature with various abilities. The concept was inspired by H. G. Wells' novel The Island of Doctor Moreau. The player-created armies are capped at 9 creatures; each one is a combination of any two animals from a list of 76 (51 with no downloads). Many animals possess inherent abilities and players can plan units and armies to combine multiple such abilities or compensate for weaknesses. There is an extensive single-player campaign as well as online multiplayer functionality with different game modes, add-ons, custom maps, mods, and scenarios.

Impossible Creatures was followed up later by a free downloadable expansion entitled Insect Invasion, which added new creatures and abilities to the game. The last official add-on for Impossible Creatures was released in 2004.

On November 12, 2015, Impossible Creatures was released on Steam as Impossible Creatures: Steam Edition, by THQ Nordic. Relic Entertainment and Sega relinquished the rights of Impossible Creatures to THQ Nordic after it was revealed that neither THQ nor Microsoft Studios owned the rights to the video game.

The Steam version includes all patches and expansion packs released in the past, the IC Online servers re-implemented through Steam's cloud service and the game's modding software development kit included in the package alongside the Mission Editor originally available within the game's files. Steam Workshop support came out in Patch 3. The Steam Edition is also optimized for modern computer systems and software. The game was also released on GOG.com shortly after it appeared on Steam.

== Gameplay ==
=== Campaign ===
This mode consists of 15 different missions, spanning over a group of islands in the South Pacific known as the Isla Variatas, indicating the variety of environments presented to the player, ranging from jungles, deserts, or Arctic regions. The protagonist Rex Chance is required to collect animal DNA throughout the campaign in order to add more animal varieties to his army of combined creatures.

=== Multiplayer ===
There are three game types available during multiplayer mode, which allows for up to six players at once.

In "Destroy Enemy Lab", the first to destroy the enemies' laboratories is the winner. Due to the strategy of destroying an opponent's lab without actually defeating their army, Relic in its mod Insect Invasion added a defense shield that can be researched and then turned on to protect the lab, at the cost of 35 points of electricity per second.

In "Destroy Enemy Base", the winner is the first to destroy all enemy buildings, including the lab.

In "Hunt Rex", each player is given a special unit, Rex Chance, and players must hunt down and kill other participants' Rex Chance units. Multiplayer games can be played via the IC Online (ICO) service, via a LAN connection, or by connecting directly to the host player's IP address.

== Plot ==
Dr. Eric Chanikov (voiced by Lee Tockar) was one of the brightest scientific minds in history, but after a failed experiment causes the Tunguska Event and kills his wife, he goes into willing exile at a chain of remote islands. There, he reports the creation of the Sigma Technology, a method which makes it possible to fuse two creatures together into a single organism. These reports are ignored by the scientific and mainstream communities.

In 1937, believing that his last days are upon him, Chanikov sends a letter to his son Rex (voiced by Lee Tockar) asking him to visit. Rex, a disgraced war reporter going by the name "Rex Chance", travels to the archipelago. Discovering that his father died at the hands of the evil tycoon Upton Julius (voiced by David Kaye), he vows to avenge his father's murder. He is assisted by the late Chanikov's assistant Dr. Lucy Willing (voiced by Kathleen Barr). With her help, Rex quickly learns the power of the Sigma technology they were working on, as well as more about his family's past. As he spends time around the Sigma technology, latent abilities are made manifest within him. These abilities make him increasingly superhuman, allowing him to directly assist his Sigma Creatures in battle while making use of different henchmen (all voiced by David Kaye) and helping out the different islands' natives (all voiced by Sam Vincent).

Lucy's and Rex's progress is slowed by those loyal to Julius: Whitey Hooten (voiced by Lee Tockar), a whaler whose Sigma-created creatures are slow and powerful, Velika la Pette (voiced by Kathleen Barr), a high-strung aristocrat who relies on aerial units, and Dr. Ganglion (voiced by Lee Tockar), a mad scientist fond of using creatures most would call abominations. Each main enemy has control over an island chain with different climates: from winter conditions, to tropical, to desert.

Julius is confronted by Rex. The reasoning behind Rex's latent abilities is at last revealed: he is the accidental first product of the Sigma technology, a human combined with thousands of animal traits, which explains why Rex has developed these abilities throughout the game. Rex manages to defeat Julius who is carried off by a bat/vulture hybrid. As the game closes, Rex is shown with his pupils missing, a trait common among Sigma-created creatures.

== Development ==
The game was originally called Sigma: The Adventures of Rex Chance. According to early previews, players had to tranquilize creatures and bring them back to the base to collect their DNA. In the final product, though, it is enough for Rex to shoot a creature to collect its DNA. This only applies to the single-player campaign; in a regular multi-player skirmish, all creatures are already available.

Although it would not be released on Steam until 2015, Impossible Creatures was one of the first titles that Valve used to demonstrate Steam in 2003. This was probably due to Valve and Relic’s close relationship; as both had worked with Sierra Online.

The development of the 2015 remastered edition involved recreating much of Relic's postlaunch work on the SDK and Insect Invasion add-on, as well as rewriting the multiplayer networking for Steam and modern firewalls. Before and after the Steam re-release, the Tellurian mod—which adds many creatures, maps, and balancing tweaks—became a large focal point for the game's community. In fact, fixes made by the Tellurian mod developers were integrated back into the base game in an official patch.

== Reception ==
Reception

Aggregate score
| Aggregator | Score |
|---|---|
| Metacritic | 72/100 |

Review scores
| Publication | Score |
|---|---|
| AllGame | 3.5/5 |
| Computer Games Magazine | 2.5/5 |
| Computer Gaming World | 2.5/5 |
| Edge | 5/10 |
| Eurogamer | 7/10 |
| G4 | 4/5 |
| Game Informer | 7.5/10 |
| GamePro | 4/5 |
| GameRevolution | B |
| GameSpot | 7.9/10 |
| GameSpy | 3/5 |
| GameZone | 8.5/10 |
| IGN | 8.3/10 |
| PC Gamer (US) | 85% |
| The Cincinnati Enquirer | 3.5/5 |
| GameStar | 67% |
| GMR Magazine | 8/10 |
| Entertainment Weekly | C |
| New Age Gaming (NAG) | 72/100 |

The game received "average" reviews according to video game review aggregator website Metacritic.

Maxim gave it a score of eight out of ten, saying that "Once you get past all the gamesmanship, you can concentrate on bitch-slapping Mother Nature by creating twisted beasts that would make Jack Hanna brown his khakis." However, The Cincinnati Enquirer gave it three-and-a-half stars out of five and said that its gameplay "doesn't match the title's ingenious premise." Entertainment Weekly gave it a "C", saying, "If most real-time strategy titles are elaborate versions of rock-paper-scissors, Impossible Creatures is the world's most sophisticated game of rock."

== See also ==
- Spore
- L.O.L.: Lack of Love
- Seventh Cross: Evolution
- Evolution: The Game of Intelligent Life
- E.V.O.: Search for Eden
- Creatures
- SimLife
- SimEarth
- Genewars
- Evolva
- Tokyo Jungle
