= Spore (2008 video game) =

2008 video game

- Developer: Maxis
- Publisher: Electronic Arts
- Designers: Will Wright; Alex Hutchinson; Jenna Chalmers; Chaim Gingold
- Programmer: Andrew Willmott
- Artist: Michael A. Khoury
- Composers: Brian Eno; Cliff Martinez
- Platforms: Microsoft Windows; Mac OS X
- Release: AU: September 4, 2008; EU: September 5, 2008; NA: September 7, 2008
- Genres: God game, life simulation, real-time strategy
- Mode: Single-player

Spore is a 2008 god game developed by Maxis and published by Electronic Arts for Windows and Mac OS X. Designed by Will Wright, it covers many genres including action, real-time strategy, and role-playing games. Spore allows a player to control the development of a species from its beginnings as a microscopic organism, through development as an intelligent and social creature, to interstellar exploration as a spacefaring culture. It has drawn wide attention for its massive scope, and its use of open-ended gameplay and procedural generation. Throughout each stage, players are able to use various creators to produce content for their games. These are then automatically uploaded to the online Sporepedia and are accessible by other players for download.

Spore was released after several delays to generally favorable reviews. Praise was given for the fact that the game allowed players to create customized creatures, vehicles, and buildings. Spore was criticized for its gameplay which was seen as shallow by many reviewers; GameSpot remarked: "Individual gameplay elements are extremely simple." Controversy surrounded Spore due to the inclusion of SecuROM, and its digital rights management software, which can potentially open the user's computer to security risks.

== Gameplay ==
Spore allows the player to develop a species from a microscopic organism to its evolution into a complex creature, its emergence as a social, intelligent being, to its mastery of the planet, and then finally to its ascension into space, where it interacts with alien species across the galaxy. Throughout the game, the player's perspective and species change dramatically.

The game is broken up into distinct "stages". The outcome of one phase affects the initial conditions and leveling facing the player in the next. Each phase exhibits a distinct style of play, and has been described by the developers as ten times more complicated than its preceding phase. Phases often feature optional missions; when the player completes a mission, they are granted a bonus, such as a new ability or money. If all of a player's creations are eliminated at some point, the species will respawn at its nearest colony or the beginning of the phase.

Unlike many other Maxis games, Spore has a primary win condition, which is obtained by reaching a supermassive black hole placed at the center of the galaxy and receiving a "Staff of Life". However, the player may continue to play after any goal has been achieved. The first four phases of the game, if the player uses the editors only minimally, will take up to 15 hours to complete, but can take as little as one or two hours. Note that there is no time limit for any stage: the player may stay in a single stage as long as they wish, and progress to the next stage when ready. At the end of each phase, the player's actions cause their creature to be assigned a characteristic, or consequence trait. Each phase has three consequence traits, usually based on how aggressively or peacefully the phase was played. Characteristics determine how the creature will start the next phase and give it abilities that can be used later in the game.

=== Stages ===
Spore is a game that is separated into stages, each stage presenting a different type of experience with different goals to achieve. The five stages are the Cell Stage, the Creature Stage, the Tribal Stage, the Civilization Stage, and the Space Stage. Once the primary objective is completed, the player has the option to advance to the next stage, or continue playing the current stage.

==== Cell Stage ====
A screenshot of a near-final prototype cell stage. The large creatures in the background are drawn into the foreground as the player's organism evolves.

The Cell Stage (sometimes referred to as the tide pool, cellular, or microbial stage) is the very first stage in the game, and begins with a cinematic explanation of how the player's cell got onto the planet through the scientific concept of panspermia, with a meteor crashing into the ocean of a planet and breaking apart, revealing a single-celled organism. The player guides this simple microbe around in a 3D environment on a single 2D plane, reminiscent of Flow, where it must deal with fluid dynamics and predators, while eating meat chunks or plants. The player may choose whether the creature is a herbivore or a carnivore prior to starting the stage. The player can find "meteor bits" (apparently from the aforementioned panspermic meteor) or kill other cells to find parts that upgrade their creature by adding abilities such as electricity, poison or other parts. Once the microbe has found a part, the player can call a mate to enter the editor, in which they can modify the shape, abilities and appearance of the microbe by spending "DNA points" earned by eating meat chunks or plants in the stage.

The cell's eating habits in the Cell Stage directly influence its diet in the Creature Stage, and only mouths appropriate to the diet (Herbivore, Carnivore, or Omnivore) established in the Cell Stage will become available in the Creature Stage. Once the creature grows a brain and the player decides to progress to the next stage, the creature editor appears, prompting the user to add legs before the shift to land. The Creature editor differs in that it gives the player the ability to make major changes to the creature's body shape and length, and place parts in three-dimensional space instead of a top-down view as in the Cell editor.

==== Creature Stage ====
In the Creature Stage, the player creates their own land creature intended to live on a single continent. If the player attempts to swim to another island, an unidentified monster eats the player, and the player is warned not to come again. The biosphere contains a variety of animal species which carnivorous and omnivorous creatures can hunt for food, and fruit-bearing plants intended for herbivores and omnivores. The player creature's Hunger becomes a measured stat as well as its Health in this stage; depletion of the Hunger meter results in Health depletion and eventual death of the player creature unless food is eaten.

In the Creature Stage, the player has a home nest where members of their own species are located. The nest is where the player respawns following death, and acts as a recovery point for lost HP. Other species' nests are spread throughout the continent. While interacting with them, the player can choose to be social or aggressive; how the player interacts with other creatures will affect their opinion of the player's species. For instance, by mimicking their social behaviors (singing, dancing etc.), NPC creatures will eventually consider the player an ally, but if the player harms members of their species, they will flee or become aggressive upon sighting them. The player can heal in allied nests and add allied creatures to their packs. Epic creatures, which are rare, aggressive creatures more than twenty times the player's height, feature prominently in the Creature Stage. The player cannot use social interactions with an Epic creature. There are also Rogue creatures which may be befriended or attacked. Additionally, spaceships may appear in this stage and abduct a creature.

Progress in the Creature Stage is determined by the player's decisions on whether to befriend or attack other species. These decisions will affect the abilities of the player's species in subsequent stages of the game. Successful socialization and hunting attempts will give DNA Points, which may be spent on many new body parts. The player will also be rewarded with multiple DNA points for allying with or causing the extinction of a species. Placing new parts in the Creature editor comes at the expense of DNA points; more expensive parts will further upgrade the player creature's abilities for either method of interaction, as well as secondary abilities such as flight, speed or boosted health. After the player is finished editing, a newly evolved generation of creatures will be present in the home nest as the player's creature hatches. As the player's creature befriends or hunts more creatures, its intelligence and size increases until it can form a tribe.

==== Tribal Stage ====
After the brain of the player's species evolves sufficiently, the species may enter the Tribal Stage. The species' design becomes permanent, and the player sheds control of an individual creature in favor of the entire tribe group, as the game focuses on the birth of division of labor for the species. The player is given a hut, a group of up to 12 fully evolved creatures, as well as two of six possible Consequence Abilities, unlocked depending on the species' behavior in the previous phases. This is only possible if the player played the previous stages; if the player started directly from the Galaxy Screen, they are locked.

Gameplay during this stage is styled as an RTS. Rather than controlling one creature, the player now controls an entire tribe and can give them commands such as gathering food, attacking other tribes or simply moving to a certain location. The player may give the tribe tools such as weapons, musical instruments, and healing or food-gathering implements. Food now replaces "DNA points" as the player's currency, and can be spent on structures and additional tribe members, or used to appease other tribes of different species. Tribe members also gain the option to wear clothes, the editing of which replaces the Creature Editor in the 'Tribal Outfitter'.

Combat can be made more effective with weapons like stone axes, spears, and torches. For socializing, a player can obtain musical instruments: wooden horns, maracas and didgeridoos. Miscellaneous tools can be used for fishing and gathering food and for healing tribe members. All tools, however, require a specialized tool shack, which costs food to build. Tribe members can also gather food, an essential concept. Food can be stolen by wild creatures or by other tribes in the form of raids.

The diet choice that the player made in prior stages, whether herbivore, omnivore, or carnivore, determines what food the tribe can gather and eat. Animals can be hunted for meat, and fish or seaweed can be speared for food. Fruit is gathered from trees and bushes, and players can also domesticate animals for eggs, which all diet types can eat. Any foreign animals in the player's pack in the Creature Stage are automatically added to the tribe as farm animals. Epic creatures may threaten nests or tribes. Allied tribes will occasionally bring the player gifts of food. Players can steal food from other tribes (though it angers them), and dead tribes may be pillaged for their food.

There are five other tribes that appear along with the player's tribe. For every tribe befriended or destroyed, a piece of a totem pole is built, which may increase the population limit of the player's tribe or grant access to new tools and clothes. When all five tribes are allied or conquered, the player may move forward to the Civilization Stage.

==== Civilization Stage ====
The Civilization Stage focuses on the player developing many cities of three types: Economic, Military and Religious.

The events of Tribal Stage have left the player's tribe the dominant species of the planet, but the species itself has now fragmented into many separate nations. The player retains control of a single nation with one city. The goal in the civilization phase is to gain control of the entire planet, and it is left to the player to decide whether to conquer it using military force, diplomacy, or religious influence. Two new editors (the building and vehicle editors) are used to create city buildings and vehicles. The player can place three types of buildings (House, Factory, and Entertainment) around the City Hall (which can also be customized) and may build up to 3 types of vehicles (sea, land and air) at each city. These vehicles serve military, economic or religious purposes. The main unit of currency is "Sporebucks", which is used to purchase vehicles and buildings. To earn income, players can capture spice geysers and set up spice derricks at their locations, conduct trade, or build factories.

In constructing vehicles and buildings, as with most real-time strategy games, there is a capacity limit; building houses will increase the cap, and constructing various buildings adjacent to one another will provide a productivity bonus or deficit.

The presence of other nations requires the player to continue expanding their empire using military force, propaganda, or simply buying out cities. Players can choose their method of global domination depending on the types of cities they own. Military states grow solely by attacking other cities. Nations with a religious trait construct special missionary units that convert other cities via religious propaganda. Likewise, economic states communicate solely by trade and have no weapons (except for defensive Turrets). If the player's nation captures a city of a different type, they can choose to have the city retain its original type if they wish, or convert it to match the type it was captured with. Players of all three ideological paths can eventually use a superweapon, which requires a large number of cities and Sporebucks, but gives the player a significant advantage over rival nations. Aside from enemy nations, Epic creatures may threaten individual cities.

==== Space Stage ====
In the Space Stage, the player has access to a galactic map for interstellar travel.

The Space Stage provides new goals and paths as the player's species begins to spread through the galaxy. The game adopts the principle of mediocrity, as there are numerous forms of life scattered throughout the galaxy.

The player controls a single spaceship, built at the beginning of the Space Stage. The player can travel by clicking on other planets and moons and stars, though each jump costs energy. Later in the game, the player can purchase a wormhole key which enables them to travel through black holes, offering instant transportation to a sister black hole. There are around 500,000 planets in the game's galaxy orbiting around 100,000 stars (including Earth and its star, Sol).

Players can visit and explore all rocky planets with all their lifeforms and geologic structure. These planets can also be terraformed and colonized. The colonization of new worlds makes the player's civilization more influential and increases its income.

Players can make contact with other space-faring civilizations, or "empires", which sport many different personalities and worldviews, ranging from diplomatic and polite species willing to ally, to distrustful, fanatical empires more willing to wage war. Completing missions for an empire improves the player's relationship with them, as does trading and assisting in fending off attacks. When the player has become allied with an empire, they can ask certain favors of the empire. If the player becomes enemies with an empire, they will send a small fleet of ships to attack the player's ship as soon as they enter their territory.

One of the main goals in the Space Stage is for the player to push their way toward a supermassive black hole at the galaxy's center, which introduces the game's final antagonists, the Grox, a unique species of cybernetic aliens with a powerful empire of 2,400 systems surrounding the core. Getting to the center of the galaxy and entering starts a cinematic in which the player is introduced to Steve. After the cinematic dialogue with Steve ends the player is shot out of the black hole, and gets rewarded with the Staff of Life.

Another major goal in the game is to eradicate the Grox, which yields an achievement.

==== Removed stages ====
Several other stages were mentioned at various points by the developers, including:

- Molecular Stage, preceding the Cell Stage, featuring gameplay similar to Tetris - controlling molecules to build up into bigger organisms.
- Aquatic Stage, following the Cell Stage, shown in GDC demo, where the player controls a fish (or any underwater organism), living in an aquatic environment. After the release of the game, the idea was later transformed into a concept of a hypothetical DLC, called "The Depths", but it was quickly scrapped for similar reasons the original stage was removed - problems with animation, navigation, camera and creature parts.
- City Stage, following the Tribal Stage, presumably cut in the later stages of development, with player controlling a single city with its own agriculture and population.

Galactic Adventures

If Galactic Adventures is installed, the player may be given missions which involve travelling to planets, beaming down and completing Maxis-created, planetside 'adventures'. With this expansion, the player can also outfit their Captain with weapons and accessories which assist in these adventures. The occupants of allied ships can also take part.

=== Editors/creators ===
Tribal phase clothing editor

User-generated content is a major feature of Spore; there are eighteen different editors (some unique to a phase). All have the same general UI and controls for positioning, scaling and colouring parts, whether for the creation of a creature, or for a building or vehicle. The Creature editor, for example, allows the player to take what looks like a lump of clay with a spine and mould it into a creature. Once the torso is shaped, the player can add parts such as legs, arms, feet, hands, noses, eyes, and mouths. Many of these parts affect the creature's abilities (speed, strength, diet, etc.), while some parts are purely decorative. Once the creature is formed, it can be painted using a large number of textures, overlays, colours, and patterns, which are procedurally applied depending on the topology of the creature. The only required feature is the mouth. All other parts are optional; for example, creatures without legs will slither on the ground like a slug or an inchworm, and creatures without arms will be unable to pick up objects.

Although there is not a formal planet editor, in the Space Stage, players can freely terraform all rocky planets in the galaxy, adding mountains, valleys, lakes, etc. Players can also change these planets' biological ecosystems.

There are two new editors seen in the new expansion Spore Galactic Adventures: these include the captain editor (also called the captain outfitter) and the adventure creator, which enables terraforming and placing objects freely on adventure planets.

== Community ==
Spore's user community functionality includes a feature that is part of an agreement with YouTube granting players the ability to upload a YouTube video of their creatures' activity directly from within the game, and EA's creation of "The Spore YouTube Channel", which will showcase the most popular videos created this way. In addition, some user-created content will be highlighted by Maxis at the official Spore site, and earn badges of recognition. One of Spore's most social features is the Sporecast, an RSS feed that players can use to subscribe to the creations of any specific Spore player, allowing them to track their creations. There is a toggle which allows the player to restrict what downloadable content will be allowed; choices include: "no user generated content", "official Maxis-approved content", "downloadable friend content", and "all user-created content". Players can elect to ban content in-game, at any time, and Maxis monitors content for anything deemed inappropriate, issuing bans for infractions of content policy.

=== Spore API ===
Spore has also released an API (application programming interface) to allow developers to access data about player activity, the content they produce and their interactions with each other. The Spore API is a collection of RESTful public web services that return data in .XML format. In April 2009, the results of the Spore API Contest was concluded with winners building interactive visualizations, games, mobile applications and content navigation tools. The API also includes a Developers forum for people wishing to use all the creations people have made to create applications.

=== Interplay ===
The game is referred to as a "massively single-player online game" and "asynchronous sharing." Simultaneous multiplayer gaming is not a feature of Spore. The content that the player can create is uploaded automatically to a central database, cataloged and rated for quality (based on how many users have downloaded the object or creature in question), and then re-distributed to populate other players' games. The data transmitted is very small—only a couple of kilobytes per item transmitted—due to procedural generation of material.

Via the in-game "MySpore Page", players receive statistics of how their creatures are faring in other players' games, which has been referred to as the "alternate realities of the Spore metaverse." The game also reports how many other players have interacted with the player. For example, the game reports how many times other players have allied with the player's species. The personalities of user-created species are dependent on how the user played them.

Players can share creations, chat, and roleplay in the Sporum, the game's internet forum hosted by Maxis. Multiple sections allow forum users to share creations and tips for the game, as well as roleplay.

=== Sporepedia ===
Sporepedia during a game

The Sporepedia keeps track of nearly every gameplay experience, including the evolution of a creature by graphically displaying a timeline which shows how the creature incrementally changed over the eons; it also keeps track of the creature's achievements, both noteworthy and dubious, as a species. The Sporepedia also keeps track of all the creatures, planets, vehicles and other content the player encounters over the course of a game. Players can upload their creations to Spore.com to be viewed by the public at the Sporepedia website. As of May 2009, the list of creations has surpassed 100 million items.

== Development ==
Spore uses procedural generation extensively in relation to content pre-made by the developers. Wright mentioned in an interview given at E3 2006 that the information necessary to generate an entire creature would be only a couple of kilobytes, and went on to give the following analogy: "think of it as sharing the DNA template of a creature while the game, like a womb, builds the 'phenotypes' of the animal, which represent a few uploaded and downloaded freely and quickly from the Sporepedia online server. This allows users to asynchronously upload their creations and download other players' content, which enriches the experience of the game as more of its players progress in the game."

== Reception ==
Reception

Aggregate scores
Aggregator	Score
GameRankings	84.40%
Metacritic	84%

Review scores
Publication	Score
1Up.com	B+
Eurogamer	9/10
Game Informer	8.75/10
GamePro	4/5
GameSpot	8.0/10
GameSpy	4.5/5
IGN	9.2/10
PC Gamer (UK)	91%
PC Gamer (US)	91%
X-Play	5/5
Wired	7/10

Award
Publication	Award
BAVGA	Best Technical Achievement

IGN Australia awarded Spore a 9.2 out of 10 score, saying, "It [Spore] will make you acknowledge just how far we've come, and just how far we have to go, and Spore will change the way you think about the universe we live in." PC Gamer UK awarded the game a 91%, saying "Spore's triumph is painfully ironic. By setting out to instill a sense of wonderment at creation and the majesty of the universe, it's shown us that it's actually a lot more interesting to sit here at our computers and explore the contents of each other's brains." In its 4.5 (of 5) -star review, GameSpy wrote "Spore is a technological triumph that introduces a whole new way of tapping into a bottomless well of content."

Most of the criticism of Spore came from the lack of depth in the first four phases, summarized by Eurogamer's 9 of 10 review, which stated, "for all their mighty purpose, the first four phases of the game don't always play brilliantly, and they're too fleeting." 1UP.com reasoned in its B+ graded review, "It's not a perfect game, but it's definitely one that any serious gamer should try." GameSpot in its 8.0 of 10 review called Spore "a legitimately great game that will deliver hours of quality entertainment", but criticized the "individual gameplay elements [that] are extremely simple." Jason Ocampo's IGN 8.8 of 10 review stated, "Maxis has made an impressive product that does so many incredible things" but added, "while Spore is an amazing product, it's just not quite an amazing game."

The New York Times review of Spore mostly centered on lack of depth and quality of gameplay in the later phases of the game, stating that "most of the basic core play dynamics in Spore are unfortunately rather thin." While a review in PC Gamer US stated that "it just isn't right to judge Spore in the context of so many of the other games we judge", Zero Punctuation was also critical of the game, claiming it did not live up to the legacy of The Sims: "The chief failing of Spore is that it's trying to be five games, each one a shallow and cut down equivalent of another game, with the Civilization Stage even going so far as to be named after the game [Civilization] it's bastardizing."

Criticism has also emerged surrounding the stability of the game, with The Daily Telegraph stating: "The launch of Spore, the keenly anticipated computer game from the creators of The Sims, has been blighted by technical problems." In an interview published by MTV, Spore designer Will Wright responded to early criticism that the phases of the game had been dumbed-down by explaining: "We were very focused, if anything, on making a game for more casual players. Spore has more depth than, let's say, The Sims did. But we looked at the Metacritic scores for Sims 2, which was around ninety, and something like Half-Life, which was ninety-seven, and we decided — quite a while back — that we would rather have the Metacritic and sales of Sims 2 than the Metacritic and sales of Half-Life."

In its first three weeks on sale, the game sold 2 million copies, according to Electronic Arts. It received a "Silver" sales award from the Entertainment and Leisure Software Publishers Association (ELSPA), indicating sales of at least 100,000 copies in the United Kingdom.

During the 12th Annual Interactive Achievement Awards, the Academy of Interactive Arts & Sciences awarded Spore with "Outstanding Achievement in Gameplay Engineering", along with receiving nominations for "Computer Game of the Year" and "Outstanding Innovation in Gaming".

=== DRM controversy ===
Spore uses a modified version of the controversial digital rights management (DRM) software SecuROM as copy protection, which requires authentication upon installation and when online access is used. This system was announced after the originally planned system met opposition from the public, as it would have required authentication every ten days. Additionally, EA released the game under a policy by which the product key of an individual copy of the game would only be authenticated on up to three computers; however, some users ran afoul of the limitations as the software would consider even a slight change of hardware to constitute a different computer, resulting in all authorizations being used up by those who often upgrade their computer. In response to customer complaints, this limit was raised to five computers. After the activation limit has been depleted, EA Customer Service will consider further activations on a case-by-case basis. A survey conducted by EA revealed that only 14% have activated on more than 1 PC and less than 1% of users have tried to activate Spore on more than 3 PCs.

By September 14, 2008 (ten days after the game's initial Australian release), 2,016 of 2,216 ratings on Amazon gave the game one out of five stars, most citing EA's implementation of DRM for the low ratings. Electronic Arts cited SecuROM as a "standard for the industry" and Apple's iPod song DRM policy as justification for the control method. Former Maxis developer Chris Harris labeled the DRM a "screw up" and a "totally avoidable disaster".

The SecuROM software was not mentioned on the box, in the manual, or in the software license agreement. An EA spokesperson stated that "we don't disclose specifically which copy protection or digital rights management system we use [...] because EA typically uses one license agreement for all of its downloadable games, and different EA downloadable games may use different copy protection and digital rights management.” A cracked version without the DRM was released two days before the initial Australian release, making Spore the most torrented game on BitTorrent in 2008 and, according to one estimate, the most pirated game ever at that time.

On September 22, 2008, a class action lawsuit was filed against EA, regarding the DRM in Spore, complaining about EA not disclosing the existence of SecuROM, and addressing how SecuROM runs with the nature of a rootkit, including how it remains on the hard drive even after Spore is uninstalled. On October 14, 2008, a similar class action lawsuit was filed against EA for the inclusion of DRM software in the free demo version of the Creature Creator.

EA began selling Spore without SecuROM on December 22, 2008, through Steam. Furthermore, EA Games president Frank Gibeau announced that maximum install limit would be increased from 3 to 5 and that it would be possible to de-authorize and move installations to new machines, citing the need to adapt their policy to accommodate their legitimate customers. EA has stated, "By running the de-authorization tool, a machine 'slot' will be freed up on the online Product Authorization server and can then be re-used by another machine. You can de-authorize at any time, even without uninstalling Spore, and free up that machine authorization. If you re-launch Spore on the same machine, the game will attempt to re-authorize. If you have not reached the machine limitation, the game will authorize and the machine will be re-authorized using up one of the five available machines." However, the de-authorization tool to do this is not available on the Mac platform. In 2016, a DRM-free version of Spore was released on GOG.com.

=== Scientific accuracy ===
The educational community has shown some interest in using Spore to teach students about evolution and biology. However, the game's player-driven evolution mechanism differs from the theory of evolution in some key ways:

- The different species that appear in Spore each have different ancestors, not shared ones, and the player's creature's "evolutionary" path is linear instead of branched: one species can only evolve into one other species, as opposed to into many related species.
- In Spore, the player's creature evolves along a path towards intelligence, instead of evolving solely in response to random genetic changes and pressure from its environment. In real world evolution, there are many possible evolutionary pathways, and there is no endpoint except extinction. (However a change in environment most likely will cause the player to change their creature to help survive in a new environment e.g. growing long arms to reach fruits on trees.)
- In the real world, an organism's environment shapes its evolution by allowing some individuals to reproduce more and causing other individuals to die. In Spore, the only things shaping the way the creatures change over time are game statistics and "whatever the player thinks looks cool."
- In Spore, creatures have to collect new parts from other creatures or from skeletal remains in order to evolve those parts themselves. In reality, this does not occur, although in some cases organisms can appropriate the genes of other species. Bacteria and viruses can transfer genes from one species of macroscopic organism to another. However, this transfer is limited to single or occasionally multiple alleles; it never involves complex organs like mouths or limbs, as in Spore.
- In real evolution, microorganisms grew in size due to the rise of cyanobacteria, or photosynthesizing cells, rather than solely the consumption of additional food, as in Spore.

In October 2008, John Bohannon of Science magazine assembled a team to review the game's portrayal of evolution and other scientific concepts. Evolutionary biologists T. Ryan Gregory of the University of Guelph and Niles Elredge of the American Museum of Natural History reviewed the Cell and Creature stages. William Sims Bainbridge, a sociologist from the U.S. National Science Foundation, reviewed the Tribe and Civilization stages. NASA's Miles Smith reviewed the Space Stage. The Science team evaluated Spore on twenty-two subjects. The game's grades ranged from a single A in galactic structure and a B+ in sociology to Fs in mutation, sexual selection, natural selection, genetics, and genetic drift. In addition, Yale evolutionary biologists Thomas Near and Thomas Prum found Spore fun to play and admired its ability to get people to think about evolutionary questions, but consider the game's evolutionary mechanism to be "severely messed up". With this noted, study of how players make meaning with the game suggest that the game prompts more sophisticated thinking about evolution than the model the game presents.

According to Seed magazine, the original concept for Spore was more scientifically accurate than the version that was eventually released. It included more realistic artwork for the single-celled organisms and a rejection of faster-than-light travel as impossible. However, these were removed to make the game more friendly to casual users. While Seed does not entirely reject Spore as a teaching tool, admiring its ability to show the user experimentation, observation, and scale, biological concepts did not fare so well:

The snag is that Spore didn't just jettison half its science—it replaced it with systems and ideas that run the risk of being actively misleading. Scientists brought in to evaluate the game for potential education projects recoiled as it became increasingly evident that the game broke many more scientific laws than it obeyed. Those unwilling to comment publicly speak privately of grave concerns about a game which seems to further the idea of intelligent design under the badge of science, and they bristle at its willingness to use words like "evolution" and "mutation" in entirely misleading ways.

Will Wright argues that developers "put the player in the role of an intelligent designer" because of the lack of emotional engagement of early prototypes focusing on mutation. Intelligent design advocate Michael Behe of Lehigh University reviewed the game and said that Spore "has nothing to do with real science or real evolution—neither Darwinian nor intelligent design."

== Expansions ==
Spore Creepy & Cute Parts Pack is an expansion pack that was released in late 2008, it includes new parts and color schemes for creature creation. Among the new parts were additional mouths and eyes, as well as "insect legs." The pack also included new test-drive animations and backgrounds.

Spore Galactic Adventures was released on June 23, 2009. It allows the player's creature to beam onto planets, rather than using a hologram. It also adds an "Adventure Creator" which allows for the creation of missions and goals to share with the Spore community. Creatures can add new abilities, including weaponry, tanks, and crew members, as well as a section of the adventure creator that involves editing a planet and using 60 new flora parts.

Spore Bot Parts Pack is an expansion part of an EA promotion with Dr Pepper in early 2010, 14 new robotic parts for Spore creatures were released in a new patch (1.06.0000) available only from the Dr. Pepper website. Codes found on certain bottles of Dr Pepper allow the player to redeem these parts, albeit only for the US, excluding Maine. It was only available for Windows PC, and was eventually extended to Canadian residents. The promotion ended in late 2011. The Spore Bot Parts Pack has caused controversy within the Spore community, because of many problems with the download and its exclusive nature.

== Spinoffs ==
Spore Creature Creator is the creature creator element of Spore released prior to the full game, and was a demo for Spore.

Two spinoffs were released for the Nintendo DS, titled Spore Creatures and Spore Hero Arena, both somewhat focusing on the Creature phase. The former is a 2.5D story-based role-playing game as the player controls a creature kidnapped by a UFO and forced to survive in a strange world, with elements of Nintendogs, while the latter is a 3D role playing game heavily focusing on a fighting mechanic. A Wii spinoff of the game now known as Spore Hero has been mentioned by Will Wright several times, such as in his October 26, 2007 interview with The Guardian. Buechner confirmed it, revealing that plans for a Wii version were underway, and that the game would be built from the ground up and would take advantage of the Wii Remote, stating, "We're not porting it over. You know, we're still so early in design and prototyping that I don't know where we're going to end up, so I don't want to lead you down one path. But suffice to say that it's being developed with the Wii controls and technology in mind." Eventually, a spin-off under the title "Spore Hero" was announced, an adventure game built ground up for the Wii with a heavier focus on evolution.

Spore Origins is the mobile phone/iPhone/iPod spinoff of Spore, and as with the Nintendo DS version, focuses on a single phase of gameplay; in this case, the cell phase. The simplified game allows players to try to survive as a multicellular organism in a tide pool, similar to Flow. The iPhone version takes advantage of the device's touch capabilities and 3-axis accelerometer. A sequel to Spore Origins was released, known as Spore Creatures (unrelated to Nintendo DS Spore Creatures). The game was a recreation of the Creature Stage, and was released for mobile phones.

For a time, Xbox 360 and PlayStation 3 versions of Spore were under consideration. Frank Gibeau, president of Electronic Arts' Games Label announced that the publisher might use the underlying technology of Spore to develop electric software titles, such as action, real-time strategy, and role-playing games for the PlayStation 3, Xbox 360, and Wii.

Darkspore was an action role-playing game that utilized the same creature-editing mechanics. It was released in April 2011 for Microsoft Windows. The game was shut down in March 2016.

Spore Creature Keeper was a spin-off game developed by Maxis for Windows and OS X. Made for younger users, the gameplay was heavily based on The Sims. Originally planned for a summer 2009 release, the game development was eventually cancelled.

A spinoff for Facebook was released, titled Spore Islands. The gameplay was similar to games such as Dragon City, and reviews of the game were not high, with Gamezebo rating it 2/5 stars. A web-based 2D version of the Spore Creature Creator for Adobe Flash was released.

== Proposed sequel ==
The idea of a sequel for Spore was born from unsatisfied players, interested in a more scientific and realistic approach similar to the version shown in the GDC 2005 demo. The big difference between demo and the final product and the absence of a modern sequel is often named as a result of corporational politics of EA; Jez Corden from Windows Central mentioned that "The publisher has become renowned for wasting quality games, studios, and individual personnel in the pursuit of profits and trend chasing, over true innovation". The disappointment of the community together with the game's initial success and unique gameplay has led to the ideas and wide expectations of a "better" version of the game, which is sometimes called Spore 2.

Spore's community has made several attempts in creating the sequel analog themselves. Thrive is considered one of the most notable community analogs; it features a more scientific approach to the simulation of evolution of the species, and is developed by a volunteer team in an open-source format. The game is in development since 2009, and only the first stage out of 8 planned is playable. Other alternatives include The Sapling, The Universim, Planetary Life and Niche: A Genetics Survival Game. Other, unconnected to Spore games like No Man's Sky, Kerbal Space Program or Stellaris are also mentioned as similar to Spore.

In 2024 it was reported by the announcement on the official website of the game that a new development team is working on Spore and established an official Discord server, which gave hope for the creation of a sequel. The rumours were quickly dispelled when development team stated that no sequel is currently planned and no major updates for the game expected and the developers' attention is focused "on community engagement". Some journalists speculate that the creation of a sequel is "extremely unlikely, but not entirely impossible".

== Other media ==
=== Merchandising ===
There is an iTunes-style "Spore Store" built into the game, allowing players to purchase external Spore licensed merchandise, such as t-shirts, posters, and future Spore expansion packs. There are also plans for the creation of a type of Spore collectible card game based on the Sporepedia cards of the creatures, buildings, vehicles, and planets that have been created by the players. There are also indications of plans for the creation of customized creature figurines; some of those who designed their own creatures at E3 2006 later received 3D printed models of the creatures they created. On December 18, 2008, it was announced that players could now turn their creations into 3D sculptures using Z Corporations 3D printing technology.

The Spore Store on Zazzle also allows people to put their creatures on items such as T-shirts, mugs, and stickers. The Spore team worked with a comic creation software company to offer comic book versions of players' "Spore stories". Comic books with stylized pictures of various creatures, some whose creation has been shown in various presentations, can be seen on the walls of the Spore team's office. The utility was revealed at San Diego Comic-Con on July 24, 2008, as the Spore Comic Creator, which would utilize MashOn.com and its e-card software.

Spore: Galactic Edition, a special edition of the game; includes a Making of Spore DVD video, How to Build a Better Being DVD video by National Geographic Channel, The Art of Spore hardback mini-book, a fold-out Spore poster and a 100-page Galactic Handbook published by Prima Games.

=== Canceled theatrical film ===
EA, 20th Century Fox, and AIG announced the development of a Spore film on October 1, 2009. The adaptation would be a CGI-animated film created by Blue Sky Studios and directed by Chris Wedge. However, the film remained in development hell for years. Following Disney's purchase of Fox, Blue Sky Studios announced that they would be closing down, leaving the film ostensibly canceled.

=== Soundtrack ===
Cliff Martinez composed the main menu galaxy theme track, along with the related interstellar and solar music. Brian Eno together with Peter Chilvers created the generative music heard while editing planets in the Space Stage. Kent Jolly, with sample source from Eno, created the generative music for the Cell Stage game, cell editor, Creature Stage game, creature editor, Tribal Stage game, and Civilization Stage building editor. Aaron Mcleran, also with some sample source from Eno, created the generative music for the tribe editor, and all of the vehicle editors. Other composers included Jerry Martin, Saul Stokes (Sporepedia music), and Marc Russo. The Civilization Stage user theme generation was designed by Kent Jolly, Aaron McLeran and Cyril Saint Girons, with sample source provided by Eno. All of the audio in Spore was implemented using a modified version of Pure Data created by Miller Puckette.

=== Use in academia ===
Spore has been used in academic studies to see how respondents display surrogation.

== See also ==
- Black & White
- Creatures
- Eco
- Elite Dangerous
- E.V.O.: Search for Eden
- Evolution: The Game of Intelligent Life
- Impossible Creatures
- L.O.L.: Lack of Love
- No Man's Sky
- Seventh Cross: Evolution
- SimEarth
- SimLife
- SpaceEngine
- Universe Sandbox
