= SimEarth =

1990 video game

SimEarth: The Living Planet
- Original cover art
- Developer: Maxis (Note: Ported to FM Towns, PC-98 and X68000 by Imagineer. Ported to SNES by Tomcat System. Ported to Mega-CD by Game Arts.)
- Publishers: Maxis; FCI (SNES); Sega (Mega CD); Hudson Soft (Super CD-ROM²)
- Designers: Will Wright; Fred Haslam
- Series: Sim
- Platforms: Macintosh, MS-DOS, Windows, FM Towns, NEC PC-9801, Super NES, Amiga, Atari ST, X68000, TurboGrafx CD, Sega CD
- Release: Mac, DOS, Windows; 1990; FM Towns, PC-98, SNES; 1991; Amiga, X68000; 1992; TurboGrafx CD, Mega-CD; 1993
- Genre: Life simulation
- Mode: Single-player

SimEarth: The Living Planet is a life simulation game, the second designed by Will Wright, published in 1990 by Maxis. In SimEarth, the player controls the development of a planet. English scientist James Lovelock served as an advisor and his Gaia hypothesis of planet evolution was incorporated into the game. Versions were made for the Macintosh, Atari ST, Amiga, IBM PC, Super Nintendo Entertainment System, Sega CD, and TurboGrafx-16. It was re-released for the Wii Virtual Console in 2009. In 1996, several of Maxis' simulation games were re-released under the Maxis Collector Series with greater compatibility with Windows 95 and differing box art, including the addition of Classics beneath the title. SimEarth was re-released in 1997 under the Classics label.

== Gameplay ==
In SimEarth, the player can vary a planet's atmosphere, temperature, landmasses, etc., then place various forms of life on the planet and watch them evolve. In the "Random Planet" game setting, the game is a software toy, without any required goals. The big (and difficult) challenge is to evolve sentient life and an advanced civilization, culminating in that species leaving the planet in an exodus. The development stages of the planet can be restored and repeated, until the planet "dies" ten billion years after its creation, the estimated time when the Sun will become a red giant and kill off all of the planet's life.

There are also eight scenarios that do have goals, the first three (Aquarium, Cambrian Earth, and 1990 Earth) involving managing the evolution and development of Earth in different stages, the next four (Mars, Venus, Ice Planet, and Dune) involving terraforming other planets to support life, and the final scenario (Earth 2XXX) involving rescuing life and civilization on a future Earth from self-replicating robots and nuclear warfare and giving the player the option of causing a great flood to help achieve this goal. In addition, there is another game mode besides Random Planet and Scenario mode, called Daisy World, where the only biome on the planet is daisies, which change their color relative to the temperature.

The game models the Gaia hypothesis of James Lovelock (who assisted with the design and wrote an introduction to the manual), and one of the options available to the player is the simplified "Daisyworld" model.

SimEarth screenshot, IBM PC version. In this simulated planet, radiates have developed sapience and are beginning to form civilizations.

The player's control of the planet in the game is quite comprehensive; display panels allow the player to regulate everything from atmospheric gases, with percentages to three decimal places, to the rate of continental drift, to the rate of reproduction and mutation of lifeforms. In addition, the player is given options to place equipment or items that interfere with the planet's development, such as oxygen generators, which increase the amount of oxygen in the atmosphere, and the monolith, a take on the one found in 2001: A Space Odyssey, which aids in increasing the intelligence of a lifeform through extraterrestrial influence.

The list of disasters ranges from natural occurrences, such as hurricanes and wildfires, to population-dependent disasters, such as diseases and pollution. Effects on the planet may be minor or major depending on the current conditions. Volcanic eruptions, for example, increase the amount of dust in the atmosphere, lowering global temperature; earthquakes in a body of water may produce tsunamis; and the shortage of nuclear fuel for a nuclear power-dependent civilization may potentially trigger nuclear war and nuclear winter.

Global warming can cause the planet's ice caps to melt and sea levels to rise, but if a planet gets very hot, the oceans boil away until there are none left, only land. A planet without any water can have oceans form if hit by an "ice meteor" (a comet). Many things have to be kept within a certain balanced range for a planet to be able to support multicellular animal life; outside this range, only single-celled lifeforms, plants, robots, and lifeforms that have been civilized can survive. This excludes most lifeforms in this game since most are multicellular animals that are not civilized.

All player-triggered actions have a cost specified in "energy units" or "omega (Ω) units"; for example, 50 energy units are required to lay down a single terrain square, while 500 units are required to lay down a terraforming device. The energy budget is determined by the level of development of the planet, and the chosen difficulty level; on the lowest difficulty level, the energy budget is unlimited.

Gameplay itself can be somewhat mystifying; species may thrive or die out for no apparent reason. Mass extinctions, however, are often followed by periods of renewed evolutionary diversification, allowing the player to experiment with new sets of species and ecosystems.

=== Taxa ===
A feature of the game is that all taxa of multicellular animals are on an equal footing, and thus it is possible to evolve, for example, sapient molluscs. The two single-celled lifeform taxa, prokaryotes and eukaryotes (or bacteria and amoebas, in the SNES version) are treated specially. Some examples of animal taxa include radiates and cetaceans as well as more known organisms such as fishes and birds. As an Easter egg, there is also machine life, which can appear if a city of the highest technology level (Nanotech Age) is destroyed by a nuclear explosion. Machine life can thrive in any biome or environmental conditions, generally out-competing any other lifeforms present, and can itself eventually evolve intelligence and build cities. Additionally, there are Carniferns, which are mutated, carnivorous plants, which can occur only naturally. Having an abundance of insects allows for these life-forms to develop. Carniferns are able to develop intelligence just as animals can. In addition to the familiar types, the long-extinct "trichordates" are included. The game states that "We [the game's developers] felt sorry for them, and are giving them a chance for survival in SimEarth." Dinosaurs are another included taxon.

=== Civilization ===
Once an organism on the SimEarth planet becomes sentient and develops civilization, it will gradually go through different stages of development with each successive stage being more technologically advanced than the last.

- Stone Age, characterized by the use of stone tools and paleolithic lifestyles.
- Bronze Age, characterized by the use of bronze tools, the invention of farming, the development of writing, and urbanization.
- Iron Age, characterized by the use of iron tools and is slightly more advanced than the Bronze Age.
- Industrial Age, characterized by rapid industrialization and improving living standards. This stage is where resources are being rapidly consumed. Once this stage is achieved, energy requirements are high and global warming starts to threaten the planet's habitability.
- Atomic Age, characterized by the use of nuclear energy.
- Information Age, associated with the mass use of telecommunications technologies and computers.
- Nanotech Age, the most challenging stage to reach due to depleting resources and the growing threat of global warming. It is associated with the use of nanotechnology and interplanetary space travel.

It is only possible for one species to reach sentience at a time on the planet. If the current sentient species becomes extinct, another species can achieve sentience. Once the sentient species reaches advanced Nanotech Age, they will begin the Exodus and launch all of their population into space. This entirely removes that species from the world, allowing other species to reach sentience.

== Development ==
Will Wright was introduced to James Lovelock by Stewart Brand, a former editor of CoEvolution Quarterly who lived near Wright, upon hearing about SimEarth. Lovelock advised the development team behind SimEarth, and particularly assisted with geophysical models. Lovelock stated in regards to the Gaia model that "Attempts to model the Earth through simple sciences such as biology or biochemistry fail because the models are oversensitive to initial conditions and prone to chaotic disturbance." Gaia models link biology and geology however, which Lovelock claimed are "for some reason stable and able to resist perturbations." Lovelock expressed that SimEarth's simulation has "a degree of realism" despite it being "little more than a game", and he expressed that he had not seen or been involved in any computer simulations of nature on the scale of SimEarth at the time, noting that many professional climate models at the time did not take clouds, the ocean, or biology into account.

== Reception ==
Reception

Review scores
Publication	Score
The One	95% (DOS)
Entertainment Weekly	A− (SNES)

Computer Gaming World called SimEarth "absolutely fascinating". The reviewer wished that the game had more SimCity-like visual feedback, but stated that it was superior to its predecessor because of larger scope and greater replayability. It won the 1991 Software Publishers Association Excellence in Software Awards for Best Secondary Education Program and Best Simulation Program.

Entertainment Weekly gave the game an A− and wrote that "While it's never too early to teach kids to respect the biosphere, the same may not be true of introducing them to complicated simulations such as Simearth: The Living Planet (FCI, for Super NES), which has more variables (temperature, precipitation, etc.) than a polynomial equation. There's something to be said for this, though: A task as simple as 'growing a daisy'—one option offered here—requires knowing far more than which button to push to cream the bad guy."

The One gave the MS-DOS version of SimEarth an overall score of 95%, and expressed that the game is fun 'regardless of whether you know what you're doing or not', and said that experimenting with the simulation is "hours of fun". The One praised SimEarth's substantial gameplay, expressing that the game has "near-infinite variations with which to experiment." The One noted the game as having "tremendous educational possibilities", but simultaneously being fun and engaging.

== See also ==
- Spore
- Impossible Creatures
- L.O.L.: Lack of Love
- Seventh Cross: Evolution
- Evolution: The Game of Intelligent Life
- E.V.O.: Search for Eden
- Creatures
- SimLife
