= Seventh Cross: Evolution =

1998 video game

- North American Dreamcast cover art
- Developer: HuneX
- Publishers: JP: NEC Home Electronics; NA: UFO Interactive Games
- Platform: Dreamcast
- Release: JP: December 23, 1998; NA: January 15, 2000
- Genre: Life simulation
- Mode: Single-player

Seventh Cross: Evolution, known in Japan as simply Seventh Cross (セブンスクロス, Sebunsu Kurosu), is a video game for the Sega Dreamcast video game console. It was released in Japan on December 23, 1998. A sequel titled Ninth Will was announced shortly after the game's North American release, but it was apparently cancelled.

== Gameplay ==
The theme of Seventh Cross is evolution. The player begins with a protist, and through eating and consuming, progresses through two other stages until it becomes an animal. The game begins in a lagoon, where the player's organism must avoid predators while nourishing itself. If the creature dies, it is returned to its lowest form unless it has successfully evolved into its 'origin' stage, in which case the creature regresses to that instead. After death, any parts gained by evolution are kept, but any gathered food is lost.

Seventh Cross contains six stages, each with a boss. The stages take place in different biomes, ranging from the pond to a barren future.

=== Evolving ===
The creature gains parts by touching the monolith in each level. Six colors, chosen at the beginning by the player, are mapped to six attributes: offense, defense, psi power, intelligence, dexterity, and healing. By creating patterns with these colors on a 10×10 grid, and possessing the required amount of EVP, the creature may gain a new part it may add to its head, body, legs, or arms. The logic behind what patterns yield what parts, however, remains unclear.

These parts may be "equipped" any time, but each require specific amounts of nutrients found in certain foods, among which are protein and fiber. After a while, the player may add enough parts to the organism to fend off and even kill other creatures, fight the stage's boss creature and advance to the next stage. Each part has different attributes that enhance particular areas like movement speed and attack strength. These parts may be added ala carte; that is, a lynx's head may be placed upon an organism with a crab's body and frog's legs. This may result in odd combinations of creatures akin to Microsoft's Impossible Creatures.

== Reception ==
Reception

Aggregate score
Aggregator	Score
GameRankings	43%

Review scores
Publication	Score
Consoles +	60%
Famitsu	24/40
GameFan	45%
GameSpot	6/10
GameSpy	4.5/10
IGN	4.2/10
Next Generation	2/5
RPGamer	2/5

The game received "unfavorable" reviews according to video game review aggregator GameRankings. Blake Fischer of NextGen said of the game, "The very, very patient may consider this a diamond in the rough (very rough), but most won't be able to stomach the first-generation PlayStation look and feel." In Japan, Famitsu gave it a score of 24 out of 40.

== See also ==
- Spore (2008 video game)
- L.O.L.: Lack of Love
- Evolution: The Game of Intelligent Life
- E.V.O.: Search for Eden
- SimLife
- SimEarth
