= Proxi =

Unreleased video game

- Developer: Gallium Studios
- Designer: Will Wright
- Engine: Unity
- Genre: Simulation

Proxi is an upcoming artificial intelligence-based life simulation video game designed by video game designer Will Wright and developed by Gallium Studios. The game is centered around creating and molding characters known as "proxies" by gradually AI-generating their memories and experiences, shaping their internal mind and personality, building an AI generated world.

The independent Gallium Studios was co-founded by Wright (creator of the SimCity franchise) and Lauren Elliott (designer of Carmen Sandiego). It will be the first game created by Wright in nearly 20 years. The game has no announced release window or platforms.

== Development ==
The game was announced in a video at Unity's keynote talk at the Game Developers Conference in San Francisco on March 19, 2018. According to its official website, the game is "a simulation of an Artificial Intelligence based on your memories and interaction with the game". Players will be able to AI-generate and then edit the memories of their "proxi", an AI. The player can gradually train the proxies personality using this, discover hidden connections between memories, and watch them interact with other proxies based on those experiences. Doing so allows the player to explore more of the "mind island", and see a mapping of the proxi's mind to reveal more unseen connections.

In collaboration with the developer Gallium Studios and the game engine company Unity Technologies, Wright launched the Proxi Art Challenge, allowing artists to submit their work for the chance to be one of two winners flown to San Francisco and interviewed by Wright and the Proxi development team. The contest ended on May 14, 2018, and the grand prize winners, Rebecca Harrison and Pavel Novak, were chosen on May 29, 2018. Rebecca Harrison went on to become the team's artist in late 2018. In December 2023 the game was showcased at Intel's AI Everywhere event in New York.

In October 2024, Gallium Studios disbanded their staff due to the lack of funding, but Will Wright continues to work on the game together with a group of developers helping for free.

In 2025, Wright said he was experiencing difficulties in pitching the game to publishers, saying "they just can't figure out how to politically or financially sell this small team of 10 or 12 people, which has huge upside, to their superiors." They were able to secure $6 million in investment funds in 2022 from Griffin Gaming Partners, but as of 2025 they had depleted their resources and were seeking additional funding. He described the game as a "Frankenstein", as a player's memories will form the "brain" of their Proxi avatar, which will create a new world, and stated that he would much rather have a "glorious failure than a mild success".
