= 12th Annual Interactive Achievement Awards =

Video game award ceremony

- Date: February 19, 2009
- Venue: Red Rock Casino, Resort & Spa
- Country: Las Vegas, Nevada, USA
- Hosted by: Jay Mohr

Highlights
- Most awards: LittleBigPlanet (8)
- Most nominations: Gears of War 2 LittleBigPlanet (10)
- Overall Game of the Year: LittleBigPlanet
- Hall of Fame: Bruce Shelley

The 12th Annual Interactive Achievement Awards was the 12th edition of the Interactive Achievement Awards, an annual awards event that honored the best games in the video game industry during 2008. The awards were arranged by the Academy of Interactive Arts & Sciences (AIAS) and were held at the Red Rock Casino, Resort & Spa in Las Vegas, Nevada on February 20, 2009. It was also held as part of the Academy's 2009 D.I.C.E. Summit, and was hosted by stand-up comedian Jay Mohr.

The award for "Outstanding Achievement in Game Direction" was introduced this year. Even though the award for "Outstanding Achievement in Game Design" was not listed in the rules & procedures for the 12th annual awards, there were still finalists named for the category. Separate awards for "Outstanding Achievement in Story" were offered for original material and adapted material. "Downloadable Game of the Year" was not offered this year. Finalists were named for "Fighting Game of the Year" and "Casual Game of the Year" this year.

Gears of War 2 and LittleBigPlanet were tied for the most nominations, with the latter winning the most awards, including "Overall Game of the Year". Sony Computer Entertainment was the most award-winning publisher. Electronic Arts had the most nominated and award-winning games. Spore won "Outstanding Achievement in Gameplay Engineering", while the mobile spin-off Spore Origins won "Cellular Game of the Year".

Bruce Shelley, creator of Age of Empires, was inducted into the Academy of Interactive Arts & Sciences Hall of Fame.

== Winners and Nominees ==
Winners are listed first, highlighted in boldface, and indicated with a double dagger (‡).

=== Game of the Year awards ===
**Overall Game of the Year**: **LittleBigPlanet** — **Media Molecule**, **Sony Computer Entertainment**‡; Fallout 3 — Bethesda Game Studios, Bethesda Softworks; Grand Theft Auto IV — Rockstar North, Rockstar Games; Left 4 Dead — Valve South, Valve; Metal Gear Solid 4: Guns of the Patriots — Kojima Productions, Konami
**Console Game of the Year**: **LittleBigPlanet** — **Media Molecule**, **Sony Computer Entertainment**‡; Fallout 3 — Bethesda Game Studios; Gears of War 2 — Epic Games, Microsoft Game Studios; Grand Theft Auto IV — Rockstar North; Metal Gear Solid 4: Guns of the Patriots — Kojima Productions, Konami	**Computer Game of the Year**: **Left 4 Dead** — **Valve South**‡; Fallout 3 — Bethesda Game Studios; Mass Effect — BioWare, Microsoft Game Studios; Spore — Maxis, Electronic Arts; World of Warcraft: Wrath of the Lich King — Blizzard Entertainment
**Hand-Held Game of the Year**: **God of War: Chains of Olympus** — **Ready at Dawn**, **Sony Computer Entertainment**‡; Advance Wars: Days of Ruin — Intelligent Systems, Nintendo; Castlevania: Order of Ecclesia — Konami; Patapon — SCE Japan Studio; Professor Layton and the Curious Village — Level-5, Nintendo	**Outstanding Innovation in Gaming**: **LittleBigPlanet** — **Media Molecule**, **Sony Computer Entertainment**‡; Braid — Number None, Microsoft Game Studios; Left 4 Dead — Valve South; Spore — Maxis, Electronic Arts; Wii Fit — Nintendo EAD

=== Craft awards ===
**Outstanding Achievement in Game Direction**: **LittleBigPlanet** — **Media Molecule**, **Sony Computer Entertainment**‡; Fallout 3 — Bethesda Game Studios; Gears of War 2 — Epic Games, Microsoft Game Studios; Left 4 Dead — Valve South; Metal Gear Solid 4: Guns of the Patriots — Kojima Productions, Konami	**Outstanding Achievement in Game Design**: **World of Goo** — **2D Boy**, **Nintendo**‡; Fable II — Lionhead Studios, Microsoft Game Studios; Fallout 3 — Bethesda Game Studios; Gears of War 2 — Epic Games, Microsoft Game Studios; Left 4 Dead — Valve South
**Outstanding Achievement in Animation**: **Prince of Persia** — **Ubisoft Montreal**‡; Castle Crashers — The Behemoth, Microsoft Game Studios; Gears of War 2 — Epic Games, Microsoft Game Studios; Left 4 Dead — Valve South; Metal Gear Solid 4: Guns of the Patriots — Kojima Productions, Konami	**Outstanding Achievement in Art Direction**: **LittleBigPlanet** — **Media Molecule**, **Sony Computer Entertainment**‡; Dead Space — EA Redwood Shores; Fable II — Lionhead Studios, Microsoft Game Studios; Mirror's Edge — DICE, Electronic Arts; Prince of Persia — Ubisoft Montreal
**Outstanding Character Performance**: **Sackboy** **(LittleBigPlanet)** — **Media Molecule**, **Sony Computer Entertainment**‡; Dom Santiago (Gears of War 2) — Epic Games, Microsoft Game Studios; Marcus Fenix (Gears of War 2) — Epic Games, Microsoft Game Studios; Old Snake (Metal Gear Solid 4: Guns of the Patriots) — Kojima Productions, Konami; Lara Croft (Tomb Raider: Underworld) — Crystal Dynamics, Eidos Interactive	**Outstanding Achievement in Gameplay Engineering**: **Spore** — **Maxis**, **Electronic Arts**‡; Fable II — Lionhead Studios, Microsoft Game Studios; Fallout 3 — Bethesda Game Studios; Left 4 Dead — Valve South; Tom Clancy's EndWar — Ubisoft Shanghai
**Outstanding Achievement in Online Gameplay**: **Left 4 Dead** — **Valve South**‡; Call of Duty: World at War — Treyarch, Activision; Gears of War 2 — Epic Games, Microsoft Game Studios; NHL 09 — EA Canada; Rock Band 2 — Harmonix, MTV Games	**Outstanding Achievement in Original Music Composition**: **Metal Gear Solid 4: Guns of the Patriots** — **Kojima Productions**, **Konami**‡; de Blob — Blue Tongue Entertainment, THQ; Dead Space — EA Redwood Shores; Fable II — Lionhead Studios, Microsoft Game Studios; World of Warcraft: Wrath of the Lich King — Blizzard Entertainment
**Outstanding Achievement in Soundtrack**: **Rock Band 2** — **Harmonix**, **MTV Games**‡; Guitar Hero World Tour — Neversoft, Activision; LittleBigPlanet — Media Molecule, Sony Computer Entertainment; MotorStorm: Pacific Rift — Evolution Studios, Sony Computer Entertainment; SingStar PS3 Vol. 1 — SCE London Studio	**Outstanding Achievement in Sound Design**: **Dead Space** — **EA Redwood Shores**‡; Gears of War 2 — Epic Games, Microsoft Game Studios; LittleBigPlanet — Media Molecule, Sony Computer Entertainment; Prince of Persia — Ubisoft Montreal; Wipeout HD — SCE Studio Liverpool
**Outstanding Achievement in Original Story**: **Fallout 3** — **Bethesda Game Studios**‡; Brothers in Arms: Hell's Highway — Gearbox Software, Ubisoft; Fable II — Lionhead Studios, Microsoft Game Studios; Grand Theft Auto IV — Rockstar North; Professor Layton and the Curious Village — Level-5, Nintendo	**Outstanding Achievement in Adapted Story**: **Star Wars: The Force Unleashed** — **LucasArts**‡; Lego Batman: The Videogame — Traveller's Tales, Warner Bros. Interactive Entertainment; Mortal Kombat vs. DC Universe — Midway Games; Naruto: The Broken Bond — Ubisoft Montreal; 007: Quantum of Solace — Treyarch, Activision
**Outstanding Achievement in Visual Engineering**: **LittleBigPlanet** — **Media Molecule**, **Sony Computer Entertainment**‡; Gears of War 2 — Epic Games, Microsoft Game Studios; Metal Gear Solid 4: Guns of the Patriots — Kojima Productions, Konami; Resistance 2 — Insomniac Games, Sony Computer Entertainment; Tomb Raider: Underworld — Crystal Dynamics, Eidos Interactive

=== Genre awards ===
**Action Game of the Year**: **Dead Space** — **EA Redwood Shores**‡; Call of Duty: World at War — Treyarch, Activision; Far Cry 2 — Ubisoft Montreal; Gears of War 2 — Epic Games, Microsoft Game Studios; Grand Theft Auto IV — Rockstar North	**Adventure Game of the Year**: **Mirror's Edge** — **DICE**, **Electronic Arts**‡; Castlevania: Order of Ecclesia — Konami; God of War: Chains of Olympus — Ready at Dawn, Sony Computer Entertainment; Naruto: The Broken Bond — Ubisoft Montreal; Prince of Persia — Ubisoft Montreal
**Casual Game of the Year**: **Braid** — **Number None**, **Microsoft Game Studios**‡; Mystery Case Files: Return to Ravenhearst — Big Fish Studios; Patapon — SCE Japan Studio; Professor Layton and the Curious Village — Level-5, Nintendo; World of Goo — 2D Boy, Nintendo	**Cellular Game of the Year**: **Spore Origins** — **Babaroga**, **Tricky Software**, **Electronic Arts**‡; Reset Generation — RedLynx, Nokia; Trism — Demiforce
**Family Game of the Year**: **LittleBigPlanet** — **Media Molecule**, **Sony Computer Entertainment**‡; Boom Blox — EA Los Angeles; Rayman Raving Rabbids: TV Party — Ubisoft Paris; Rock Band 2 — Harmonix, MTV Games; Wii Fit — Nintendo EAD	**Fighting Game of the Year**: **Super Smash Bros. Brawl** — **Sora Ltd.**, **Nintendo**‡; Mortal Kombat vs. DC Universe — Midway Games; Soulcalibur IV — Project Soul, Namco Bandai Games; Super Street Fighter II Turbo HD Remix — Backbone Entertainment, Capcom; WWE Smackdown vs. Raw 2009 — Yuke's, THQ
**Massive Multiplayer Game of the Year**: **World of Warcraft: Wrath of the Lich King** — **Blizzard Entertainment**‡; Eve Online: Quantum Rise — CCP Games; Pirates of the Burning Sea — Flying Lab Software, Sony Online Entertainment; PMOG — GameLayers; Warhammer Online: Age of Reckoning — Mythic Entertainment, Electronic Arts	**Racing Game of the Year**: **Burnout Paradise** — **Criterion Games**, **Electronic Arts**‡; GRID — Codemasters; Mario Kart Wii — Nintendo EAD; MotorStorm: Pacific Rift — Evolution Studios, Sony Computer Entertainment; Pure — Black Rock Studio, Disney Interactive Studios
**Role-Playing Game of the Year**: **Fallout 3** — **Bethesda Game Studios**‡; Fable II — Lionhead Studios, Microsoft Game Studios; Pokémon Mystery Dungeon: Explorers of Time — Chunsoft, Nintendo; Tales of Vesperia — Namco Tales Studio, Namco Bandai Games	**Sports Game of the Year**: **NHL 09** — **EA Canada**‡; FIFA 09 — EA Canada; Madden NFL 09 — EA Tiburon; MLB 08: The Show — SCE San Diego; NBA 2K9 — Visual Concepts, 2K Games
**Strategy/Simulation Game of the Year**: **Command & Conquer: Red Alert 3** — **EA Los Angeles**‡; Advance Wars: Days of Ruin — Intelligent Systems, Nintendo; Civilization Revolution — Firaxis Games, 2K Games; Sins of a Solar Empire — Ironclad Games, Stardock; Tom Clancy's EndWar — Ubisoft Shanghai

=== Special awards ===
==== Hall of Fame ====
- Bruce Shelley

=== Multiple nominations and awards ===
==== Multiple Nominations ====
Games that received multiple nominations
Nominations	Game
10	Gears of War 2
10	LittleBigPlanet
8	Fallout 3
8	Left 4 Dead
7	Metal Gear Solid 4: Guns of the Patriots
6	Fable II
4	Dead Space
4	Grand Theft Auto IV
4	Prince of Persia
3	Professor Layton and the Curious Village
3	Rock Band 2
3	Spore
3	World of Warcraft: Wrath of the Lich King
2	Advance Wars: Days of Ruin
2	Braid
2	Call of Duty: World at War
2	Castlevania: Order of Ecclesia
2	God of War: Chains of Olympus
2	Mirror's Edge
2	Mortal Kombat vs. DC Universe
2	MotorStorm: Pacific Rift
2	Naruto: The Broken Bond
2	NHL 09
2	Patapon
2	Tom Clancy's EndWar
2	Tomb Raider: Underworld
2	Wii Fit
2	World of Goo

Nominations by company
Nominations	Games	Company
21	9	Sony Computer Entertainment
20	5	Microsoft Game Studios
18	11	Electronic Arts
12	7	Nintendo
11	6	Ubisoft
10	1	Epic Games
10	1	Media Molecule
9	2	Konami
8	1	Bethesda Game Studios
8	1	Valve South
7	1	Kojima Productions
6	1	Lionhead Studios
4	3	Activision
4	1	Rockstar North
3	2	Treyarch
3	1	Blizzard Entertainment
3	1	Harmonix
3	1	Maxis
3	1	MTV Games
3	1	Level-5
2	2	2K Games
2	2	Namco Bandai Games
2	2	THQ
2	1	2D Boy
2	1	Crystal Dynamics
2	1	DICE
2	1	Eidos Interactive
2	1	Evolution Studios
2	1	Intelligent Systems
2	1	Midway Games
2	1	Number None
2	1	Ready at Dawn

==== Multiple awards ====
Games that received multiple awards
Awards	Game
8	LittleBigPlanet
2	Dead Space
2	Fallout 3
2	Left 4 Dead

Awards by company
Awards	Games	Company
9	2	Sony Computer Entertainment
8	7	Electronic Arts
8	1	Media Molecule
2	2	Nintendo
2	1	Bethesda Game Studios
2	1	Valve South
