= Spore Hero Arena =

2009 video game

- Developer: Full Fat
- Publisher: Electronic Arts
- Series: Spore
- Platform: Nintendo DS
- Release: NA: October 6, 2009; AU: October 8, 2009; UK: October 9, 2009
- Genres: Action-adventure, fighting
- Modes: Single-player, multiplayer

Spore Hero Arena is a science fiction action-adventure game for the Nintendo DS and is a spin-off of Spore Hero which was released in North America on October 6, 2009, and worldwide on October 8. This game is the second Spore game for the Nintendo DS, and focuses more on battling than its predecessor, Spore Creatures. Creatures are now rendered in full 3D and the creature design system has been overhauled. The online functions/multiplayer were closed on 30 June 2014.

== Gameplay ==
Spore Hero Arena allows the player to move around an overworld with elements of exploration and puzzle solving. On each planet there are four blue shards to collect by doing certain missions or jobs assigned to the player by the creatures that inhabit that world. These missions can vary from being a bodyguard, racing, and arena battles. Once the player gets all four a battle can be started with specific creature at the front of the champion's arena. The player's job is to enter and fight the champion to obtain the evil red fragments.

The main battle mode takes place on a top down arena. Players control their creature in both the overworld mode and battle mode via touchscreen and attack by using the directional pad or the A, B, X, Y buttons; though there is an option to have the Directional pad control movement. The player can set three different types of bio powers (special attacks) to be used in a battle, which can be used by pressing the L or R button and tapping one of three options using the stylus when the bio-power gauge is filled. The three types of bio-power focus on eliminating one enemy, damaging multiple enemies, and affecting the field respectively, and there are multiple kinds for each type. There are multiple modes of battles, including the basic Battle Royale, where players fight to knock their opponents off of the arena which is reminiscent of sumo, and a capture the flag mode in which players attempt to obtain an egg. While the player does have a health bar, it is similar to Super Smash Bros. as it only affects knock-back when pushed. Items can be picked up to obtain powerups such as health restores, knock-back reducers, increased defense, and instantly gaining access to using a bio-power.

Like most Spore games, there is a creature customization feature. Players are able to choose which body shape they want their creature to have, and are then allowed to customize their color and pattern, and add, rotate, and resize parts to their creature such as mouths, legs, arms, ears, and other decorations that all affect their creature's stats in battle and in the overworld. They are also allowed to choose what three bio-powers that the creature can use in battle. Up to fifty custom creatures can be saved in the Sporepedia.

== Reception ==
Reception

Aggregate score
Aggregator	Score
Metacritic	49%

Review score
Publication	Score
IGN	3.8/10

IGN panned Spore Hero Arena with a 3.8 out of 10 and Metacritic gave the game a 49% rating, indicating unfavorable reviews.
