= Raid on Bungeling Bay =

1984 video game designed by Will Wright

- Commodore 64 cover art
- Developers: Will Wright (C64); Hudson Soft (FC/NES/AC); ZAP Corporation (MSX)
- Publishers: NA: Broderbund (C64/NES); EU: Ariolasoft (C64); JP: Hudson Soft (FC); JP: Nintendo (AC); JP: Sony (MSX)
- Designer: Will Wright
- Programmer: Will Wright (C64)
- Platforms: Commodore 64, Famicom/NES, arcade, MSX
- Release: Commodore 64: NA: December 1984; EU: 1985; Famicom/NES: JP: February 22, 1985; NA: September 1987; Arcade: JP: April 1985; MSX: JP: 1985
- Genre: Shoot 'em up
- Mode: Single-player
- Arcade system: Nintendo VS. System

Raid on Bungeling Bay (バンゲリングベイ lit.: Bungeling Bay) is a shoot 'em up for the Commodore 64 published by Broderbund in 1984 and by Ariolasoft in the UK in 1985. It was the first video game developed by Will Wright and inspired him to create the 1989 game SimCity.

== Gameplay ==
Commodore 64 screenshot

Raid on Bungeling Bay is a 2D shoot 'em up. The player controls a helicopter launched from an aircraft carrier to bomb six factories scattered across islands on a small planetoid occupied by the Bungeling Empire (frequent villains in Broderbund games), while fending off escalating counterattacks by gun turrets, fighter jets, guided missiles, and a battleship. There is also a hidden island for the player to reload on. Failure means that the Bungeling Empire develops a war machine to take over the planet Earth. Players have to attack its infrastructure while defending the aircraft carrier which serves as home base.

Over time, the factories grow and develop new technologies to use against the player. There are visible signs of interdependence among the islands, such as supply boats moving between them. In order to win the game, the player must prevent the escalation by bombing all the factories as quickly as possible, keeping them from advancing their technology. If left alone for too long, the factories create enough new weaponry to overwhelm the player.

== Ports ==
Raid on Bungeling Bay was ported to the Famicom/NES by Hudson Soft, who published this version and released it in Japan on February 22, 1985. A conversion for the arcade-based VS. System was created based on this port, and it was distributed to arcades in Japan by Nintendo. Although a United States release was planned for the Summer of 1985, Will Wright stated in an interview that he was not sure if it actually did get released. An MSX version was developed by Zap and published by Sony. The Japanese releases of the game are alternatively titled Bungeling Bay (バンゲリングベイ, Bangeringu Bei).

== Reception ==
Raid on Bungeling Bay for the Commodore 64 sold about 20,000 to 30,000 units in America, while the Famicom version sold about a million units in Japan. Will Wright attributed this large discrepancy to the lack of software piracy on the NES due to its cartridge system, along with Raid being one of the first American games published in Japan. Sales of the game gave Wright the financial freedom to create SimCity.

Stating that Raid "blows Choplifter away!", Creative Computing in 1984 said that the game "push[es] the animation capabilities of the Commodore 64 to their very limits". The magazine concluded that it would become "one of the all-time great computer games". Compute! wrote in 1985 that Raid "possesses all the virtues needed to appease the demanding gamer", with "amazingly detailed" graphics. Computer Gaming World in 1988 approved of the Nintendo version's graphics, calling it a "high adventure with realistic overtones" that did not involve dragons or elves. The magazine named it the Action-Strategy Game of the Year for Nintendo, writing that Raid had been "rescued from Broderbund's computer software vaults, updated slightly, and sent out to challenge all the bright new [Nintendo games and] blew them out of the water ... a delightful game experience". In 1996, Computer Gaming World declared Raid on Bungeling Bay the 24th-best computer game ever released.

== Legacy ==
Wright continued to develop the editor for the game as a personal toy because he enjoyed it so much. He researched urban planning and realised that others might enjoy constructing and building cities themselves. The result, initially named City Planner, was a more advanced simulation that eventually became SimCity.
