= Trism =

2008 video game

- Developer: Demiforce
- Publisher: Demiforce
- Platform: iPhone
- Release: July 13, 2008
- Genre: Puzzle
- Mode: Single-player

Trism is a puzzle game for the Apple iPhone developed by American developer Demiforce, notable for his work on the widely acclaimed Mother 3 fan translation. The game and developer made the news for being a rags to riches story. The game makes use of the iPhone's built in accelerometer, and involves the sliding of colored triangular tiles called "trisms" in order to make matches of three or more. As soon as a match is made, the tiles disappear and, depending on the direction in which the iPhone is tilted, the gaps left behind will be filled.

== Gameplay ==
The game has been compared to Bejeweled 2, although the developer has stated the gameplay is unique, and there is a patent pending.

Trism has four gameplay modes:

=== Infinism ===
This is the main gameplay mode in which the user slides the trisms on the screen diagonally or horizontally in order to create matches of three or more trisms; the remaining gaps left behind are then filled by the surrounding trisms depending upon the direction in which the iPhone is tilted. This is shown by the compass in the lower right hand corner. The more trisms matched together the greater the number of points generated. Once a certain number of points is generated, the player then advances a level. During gameplay the player can encounter certain special trisms, such as the locked trism, which prevents trisms that are on the same axis from being moved until it is removed by matching it. There is also the bomb trism that has a countdown which decreases with every successful movement made. This trism can be moved but must be removed by matching before the countdown finishes or the game will finish.

=== Terminism ===
Terminism has the same basic gameplay as Infinism mode but with the addition of a timer. When the timer goes from green to red, called a timeout, a bomb or lock trism will spawn. In order to keep the timer green, matches must be made constantly. Unlike in Infinism, the bomb in Terminism is not counted on turn. It has a time limit. The bomb must be disarmed before it turns red, or the player will lose.

=== Syllogism ===
This is a puzzle mode whereby the player must eliminate all of the trisms in the fewest moves possible. This is done by tilting the iPhone in order to make them slide. There are 30 levels each increasing in difficulty. Some of them are solvable under par with a total score of up to -17.

=== Starshine ===
Starshine mode is an unlockable game mode available for Infinism or Terminism. To unlock this in Infinism, the player must achieve one million points in one game. To unlock it in Terminism the player must score 500,000 points in a single game before getting a timeout. The objective of Starshine mode is to create large starshine chains to achieve an extreme number of points.

== Achievements ==
The game has achievements for completing certain tasks, such as earning over 500,000 points in terminism mode before getting a timeout. There are twenty-two achievements in all, which are posted on the user's profile on the online community.

== Awards ==
Trism has won awards such as Best Casual Game from AppStoreApps.com, 1st on iLounge's Best Apps and Games, a Gold award from Pocket Gamer, Slide to Play's "Must have" award, one of Wired's "10 most awesome iPhone Apps of 2008," and was an AIAS finalist for "Cellular Game of the Year" during the 12th Annual Interactive Achievement Awards.
