= Naruto: The Broken Bond =

2008 video game

- North American box art
- Developer: Ubisoft Montreal
- Publisher: Ubisoft
- Director: Olivier Palmieri
- Producer: Stéphane Cardin
- Designer: Daniel Bisson
- Programmer: Dany Joannette
- Composer: Inon Zur
- Engine: Jade
- Platform: Xbox 360
- Release: NA: November 18, 2008; AU: November 20, 2008; EU: November 21, 2008
- Genres: Fighting, action-adventure
- Modes: Single-player, multiplayer

Naruto: The Broken Bond is an action adventure game developed by Ubisoft Montreal and published by Ubisoft for the Xbox 360. It was released worldwide in November 2008. It is a sequel to the 2007 game Naruto: Rise of a Ninja and is the second and final Naruto game to be published by Ubisoft before their rights to the IP expired.

The Broken Bond picks up where Naruto: Rise of a Ninja left off, taking place between episodes 81-135 of the anime. It contains the Search for Tsunade and the Sasuke Retrieval story arcs as well as some flashbacks of the previous game. There are 30 playable characters, a new tag-team system and original voice acting and music from the original Naruto anime.

== Development ==
The game was first revealed at the E3 2008 Convention, although work on it had started before the release of the first game. According to team member Masao Kobayashi, the developers wanted to bring something new to the franchise while still keeping the same feel of the anime that the first game had. The art direction of the sequel was definitely one of the biggest factors taken into consideration for the development of this new game.

The environments were a big part of the first game, and one of the things they wanted to make sure was that the environments in The Broken Bond would support the exploration factor by being very “rich and dense”. The lighting of the game was improved to complement the dynamic story, adding a new casting system and allowing the creation of maps with a more watercolor feel. Unlike the previous game, where the cutscenes were pre-rendered scenes from the anime, The Broken Bond now has 3D cinematics. There are also a lot more NPCs. Within the adventure mode, there are now over 70 unique character models.

The developers for The Broken Bond have also decided to keep the multiplayer system like Rise of a Ninja but have improved upon it in several ways. The online format has been overhauled with a new ranking system, and the fighting system has been greatly tweaked. Also, there are now 30 characters to choose from, 28 different characters, one DLC character, and four bonus variations. The bonus variations were Taijutsu Jumpsuit Naruto Uzumaki, Anbu Itachi, Level 2 Curse Mark Sasuke Uchiha, and One-Tailed Fox Naruto; the DLC character was Chūnin Exams Sasuke.

This was the last Naruto game to be developed by Ubisoft before Namco Bandai decided to make the Ultimate Ninja Storm for multiplatform consoles instead of being a PlayStation 3 exclusive, starting with Naruto Shippuden: Ultimate Ninja Storm 2.

== Reception ==
Reception

Aggregate score
Aggregator	Score
Metacritic	80/100

Review scores
Publication	Score
1Up.com	B−
Game Informer	8.25/10
GameRevolution	B
GameSpot	7/10
GameTrailers	7.6/10
GameZone	8.2/10
IGN	8.3/10
Official Xbox Magazine (US)	8/10
PALGN	7.5/10
TeamXbox	8/10

The game received "favorable" reviews, more so than its predecessor, according to video game review aggregator Metacritic.

Naruto: The Broken Bond was nominated for Best Game Based on a Movie or TV Show at 2008 Spike Video Game Awards, but lost to Lego Indiana Jones: The Original Adventures. During the 12th Annual Interactive Achievement Awards, the Academy of Interactive Arts & Sciences nominated Naruto: The Broken Bond for "Adventure Game of the Year" and "Outstanding Achievement in Adapted Story".
