= Chaim Gingold =

American video game designer (born 1980)

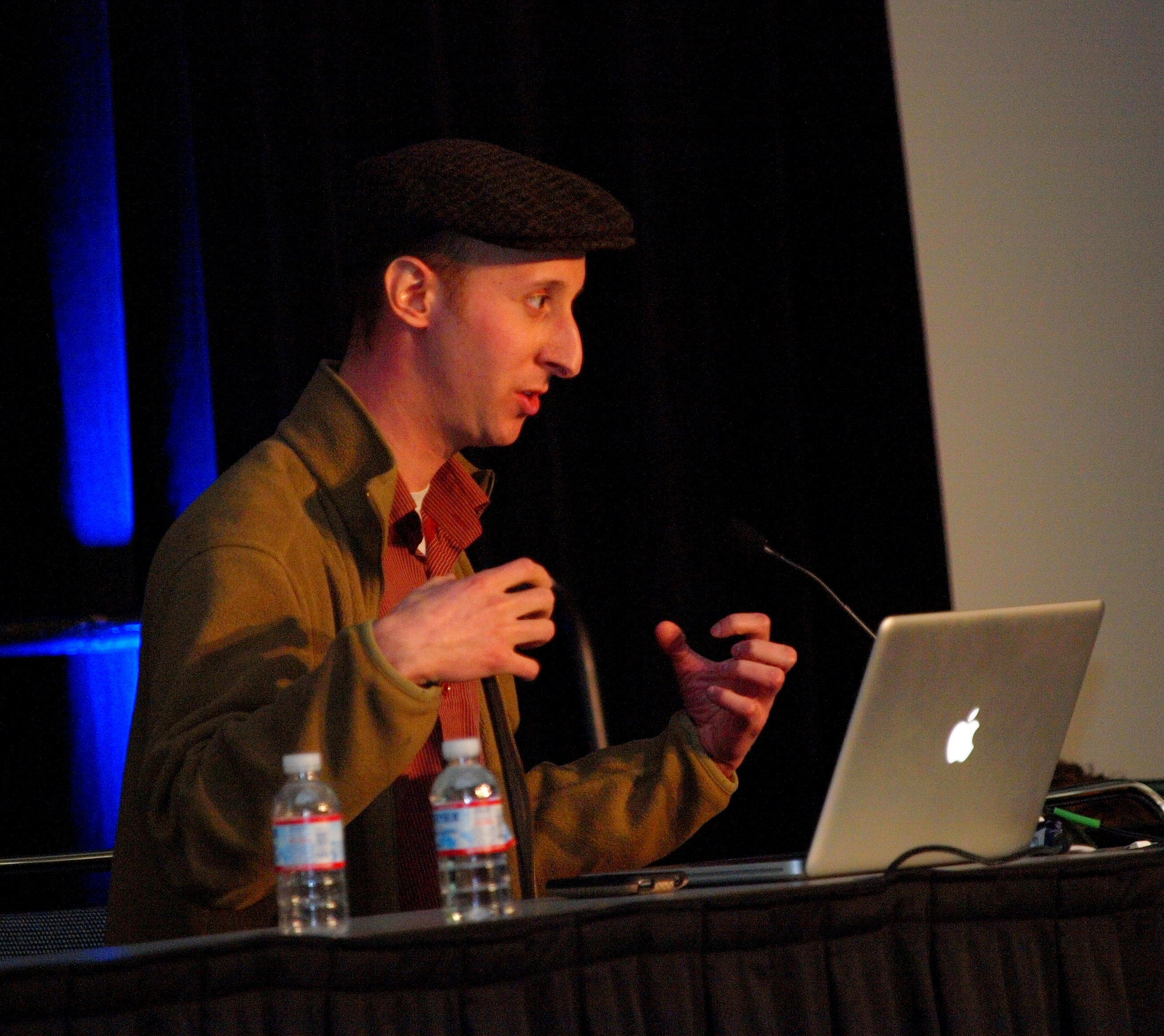
- Gingold in 2010
- Born: January 15, 1980; Haifa, Israel
- Occupation: Game designer
- Website: chaim.io

Chaim Gingold (born January 15, 1980, in Haifa, Israel) is an Israeli-American game designer and writer, noted for his work with the computer game Spore, where he designed the game's creators, including the Spore Creature Creator. Gingold was also a key member of Spore's design and prototyping team. He has presented at the Game Developers Conference and is an active participant in the academic game studies community.

Gingold grew up in Morgantown, West Virginia. He attended West Virginia University, where he studied computer science, English, and art. After college, Gingold headed to the Georgia Institute of Technology where he joined the Information Design and Technology Masters program. His dissertation was entitled "Miniature Gardens & Magic Crayons: Games, Spaces, & Worlds" and was supervised by noted scholar Janet Murray. Gingold lives in Berkeley, California, US. In 2016, he got a Ph.D. in computer science from UC Santa Cruz with a thesis "Play Design".

In January 2015, Gingold released Earth Primer, an interactive science book that simulates processes of the Earth.

His book, Building SimCity. How to Put the World in a Machine, was published in 2024 by The MIT Press.
