= Spore Creatures =

- Nintendo DS cover art
- Developers: Griptonite Games; Maxis; EA Mobile (WinM); Electronic Arts Nederland BV (BB); Electronic Arts (iPhone)
- Publishers: Electronic Arts; EA Mobile (WinM); Electronic Arts Nederland BV (BB)
- Designer: Dream Smith
- Platforms: Nintendo DS, Windows Mobile, BlackBerry, iPhone
- Release: September 4, 2008: DS; PAL: September 4, 2008; NA: September 7, 2008; JP: September 11, 2008; KO: September 27, 2008 Windows Mobile; WW: December 4, 2009 BlackBerry; WW: December 9, 2009 iPhone; WW: January 15, 2010
- Genre: Life simulation/RPG
- Modes: Single player, multiplayer

Spore Creatures is a 2008 science fiction adventure game developed by Griptonite Games and published by Electronic Arts. The game is a spin-off of Spore in which a player controls and evolves a creature of their creation to save another creature from the clutches of an alien who plans on dominating the galaxy.

An unrelated game with the same name was released in 2009 for iOS devices as a sequel to Spore Origins, featuring similar gameplay to its predecessor.

== Plot summary ==
The game begins as a new species of creatures, the Oogies, are born on the planet Tapti. Two members of this species of particular importance are the protagonist, simply known as 'Oogie', and Little Oogie, a small and primitive creature. A mysterious spaceship is flying around the planet, abducting various creatures; it captures Little Oogie and flies away. Oogie pursues the ship all over Tapti, and when it begins to fall apart after bashing into a number of objects, collecting its pieces along the way. Oogie eventually catches up with the ship as it finally crashes, and its pilot, an alien called Gar'skuther, clambers out. Gar'skuther simply summons a new ship and flies away, still in possession of Little Oogie, who has now grown a strange tentacle from his back. Oogie uses the parts he has collected to rebuild the first ship and pursue Gar'skuther through the galaxy.

On one planet, Oogie eventually comes across Gar'skuther, who is observing another creature. Seeing no threat in Oogie, he begins to explain his plan: he wishes to dominate the galaxy by experimenting on all primitive wildlife and building his genes into them - his genes cause large, dark tentacles to grow from whatever they are implanted into. In order to show Oogie his power, Gar'skuther combines a Fyristook and Flabawaba into a Fyrisaba and pits it against Oogie to test its strength. Oogie defeats the creature, but Gar' skuther flees, now realizing that Oogie may be more than just a normal creature.

Oogie eventually lands his ship on Gar'skuther's base planet of Zencrie, where he is hiding through a cave. After resolving a conflict between two native species and helping to cure a nest from the infection, Oogie reaches the cave entrance. Passing through it, Oogie comes to a small cove where Gar'skuther is waiting. The evil alien tells Oogie that he is more powerful than he originally thought, and that he will face him in battle if Oogie can defeat the Skuther - a bionic creature Gar'skuther has built using the best parts of many other species. Oogie defeats the Skuther, but Gar'skuther reveals that he has spread them all over the galaxy and that they will soon become the dominant species. Gar'skuther then proceeds to battle Oogie, but is defeated and dies, his arm is the only salvageable part left.

Upon Gar'skuther's defeat, the many Skuthers throughout the galaxy collapse, and the infection ceases to exist as the tentacles all wither away. Oogie takes the spaceship back to Tapti, where he meets a cured Little Oogie. The two creatures then carry out their lives on Tapti as a dominant, yet peaceful, species. A cutscene then shows that a creature native to Tapti called a Meeper finds the spacecraft, enters it, and flies away to an unknown planet.

== Gameplay ==
Gameplay screenshot.

The gameplay is largely based on the Creature Stage of the larger game, with elements of Nintendogs and Drawn to Life. Spore Creatures characters are ball and line generated 2.5D. Unlike the characters of Spore, creatures are rendered in 2D, but the environments remain 3D.

The gameplay largely focuses on interacting with other creatures to perform quests, play minigames and befriending or battling them to progress in the story and obtain new parts, of which up to 280 can be unlocked. Befriending creatures, which allows the player to have them along with one other creature accompany them in traveling and assist in befriending or fighting other creatures, consists of two mini-games, which are cuddling, which involves repeatedly dragging a smiling cloud over a creature, and dancing, which involves the player tapping dots representing beats when they reach an outer arrangement of flowers. Combat consists of the player, optionally accompanied by up to two befriended creatures, battling another creature by dragging the stylus over the enemy creature to damage them or using Bio-Powers, special abilities that can be used in combat at the cost of energy, to damage or prevent them from attacking or protecting or healing the player. Health can be replenished by eating food that corresponds to the player's creature's mouth type while energy can be replenished either by eating flowers or using parts that are able to gradually replenish energy.

As with Spore's Creature Stage, the player creature is created and able to later be modified in an editor using points and parts earned to give the creature different stats and skills. The player is given 20 "Body Points" at the start with which to build their initial creature, a limit that is expanded as the player levels up. Each part contributes differently to the stats, skills and other attributes of the player's creature when placed, such as what kind of food can be eaten, being able to pick up objects, gaining more health from eating food or being able to regenerate energy. Some parts grant Bio-Powers while other parts allow the player to traverse hazardous terrain that would otherwise normally damage their creature at the expense of energy.

The game features the Sporepedia, which, in this game, consists of the Badges menu, the Species Guide, which gives information on the creatures the player has encountered in the galaxy and various statistics related to them, the Planet Guide, which gives information on the planets the player has visited and, once the player has beaten the game, allows them to travel back to them, Saved Creatures, which is where the player may create and save new creatures, and Summary, which gives a summary of the player's strength and other statistics and attributes.

The game additionally features an achievement system in the form of Badges, 60 achievements that can be earned based on story progression and certain gameplay actions. Each badge rewarded rewards "Badge Points", which may be spent on new parts or cheats that enable features such as changing the appearance of the creatures or environment, adjusting the difficulty of the dancing minigame or grant invincibility to the player.

=== Multiplayer ===
The game allowed the player to save up to thirty-one different creations, including those from friends over a local, peer-to-peer connection. Players were able to have their creatures interact via the Nintendo Wi-Fi Connection; Spore Creatures was one of the few Nintendo DS or Wii games to allow a player to opt out of needing to input Friend Codes. The online multiplayer was closed on June 30, 2014.

== Reception ==
Reception

Aggregate scores
Aggregator	Score	
Aggregator	DS	iOS
GameRankings	67%	64%
Metacritic	65/100	N/A

Review scores
Publication	Score	
Publication	DS	iOS
Destructoid	4/10	N/A
Electronic Gaming Monthly	C+	N/A
Eurogamer	5/10	N/A
Famitsu	29/40	N/A
GameSpot	6.5/10	N/A
GameSpy	3.5/5	N/A
IGN	7.8/10	N/A
NGamer	60%	N/A
Nintendo Power	8/10	N/A
Official Nintendo Magazine	66%	N/A

The DS version received "mixed" reviews according to the review aggregation website Metacritic. In Japan, Famitsu gave it a score of one six, one seven, and two eights for a total of 29 out of 40.

IGN said, "The adventure is lengthy with tons of achievements to shoot for. The creature creator might not be as elaborate as PC Spore, but there's still a ton you can do to make some bizarre organisms." Eurogamer, however, panned the game in its review, stating that the game ignored what made Spore special, and that the "imaginative and sociable sandbox game feels like an afterthought, stuck in an uninspiring cycle of fetch-quests and grinding." Official Nintendo Magazine said that progress in stages always requires specific body traits, forcing the player to constantly edit their creature, and removing the whole point in the game. It was a nominee for Best Simulation Game for the Nintendo DS from IGN in their 2008 video game awards.

== See also ==
- Spore
- Spore Origins
- Nintendogs
