= Spore Origins =

2008 video game

- Developers: Babaroga, Tricky Software
- Publisher: Electronic Arts
- Producer: Andreja Djokovic
- Composer: Jason Coffman
- Platforms: iPhone, iPod (5th generation iPod classic, 3rd and 4th generation iPod nano, 1st and 2nd generation iPod Touch), N-Gage, Windows Mobile, Vu
- Release: iPod: August 25, 2008; Mobile/iPhone: September 5, 2008; N-Gage: May 19, 2009
- Genre: Action
- Modes: Single player, multiplayer

Spore Origins (also known as Spore Mobile) is the mobile device spin-off of Spore, and focuses on a single phase of the larger game's gameplay - the cell phase.

== Gameplay ==
Gameplay screenshot

The simplified game allows players to try to survive as a multicellular organism in a tide pool, with the ability to upgrade its creature as with the main game. The basic gameplay is similar to Flow. Flow designer Jenova Chen attributed Will Wright's first demo of Spore as inspiration.

Unlike the full version of Spore, the main game is roughly an hour long, and divided into 18 separate sections, or 30 sections in the iPhone and iPod touch version, with the player attacking and eating other organisms while avoiding being eaten by superior ones.

On some devices, movement is achieved by pressing the phone keys in ordinal directions. Other devices also support touching the screen to move the creature. Certain iPod devices use the click wheel as an input method, and users of the iPhone, iPod Touch, and iPod Nano may use the accelerometer. Creatures are eaten by attacking with the mouth (if the creature has one); group-eating combos can be achieved with the OK button or center button on the wheel. A section is completed after the player eats a certain amount of DNA material from other life forms.

Every three levels is followed by the creature editor, in which the player may add an upgrade to their organism in four categories: perception, attack, defense, and movement. The 3rd upgrade in each category is a "superpart". The player also unlocks a mode called "Survival", in which the player is on a single screen collecting pellets while dodging creatures.

== Issues ==
The iPod classic had lockup issues which took place on the game's initial loading screen on 1.0.x and 1.1.x software. The bugs were fixed and the game was re-released on August 31, 2008.

== Reception ==
- Spore Origins Mobile Review

=== Awards ===
During the 12th Annual Interactive Achievement Awards, the Academy of Interactive Arts & Sciences awarded Spore Origins with "Cellular Game of the Year".

== See also ==
- flOw
