= Will Wright (game designer) =

American video game designer and entrepreneur (born 1960)

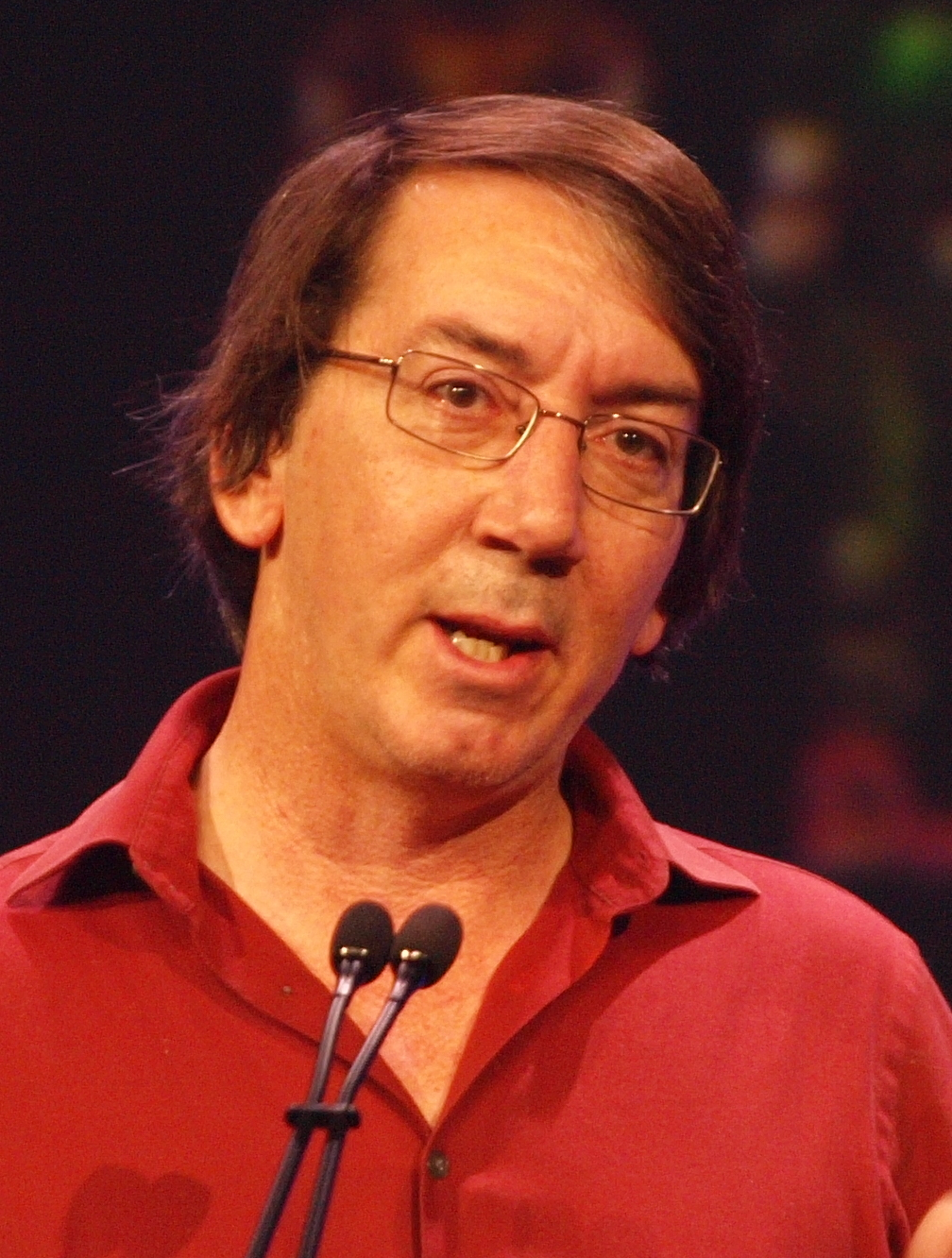
- Wright speaking at the 2010 Game Developers Conference
- Born: William Ralph Wright; January 20, 1960 (age 66); Atlanta, Georgia, U.S.
- Education: Louisiana State University; Louisiana Tech University; The New School
- Occupation: Game designer
- Known for: SimCity; The Sims; Spore
- Spouses: Joell Jones (m. 1984, divorced): Anya Zavarzina
- Children: 1

William Ralph Wright (born January 20, 1960) is an American video game designer and co-founder of the game development company Maxis, which later became part of Electronic Arts. In April 2009, he left EA to run Stupid Fun Club Camp, an entertainment think tank in which Wright and EA are principal shareholders.

The first computer game Wright designed was Raid on Bungeling Bay in 1984, but it was SimCity that brought him to prominence. The game was published by Maxis, which Wright co-formed with Jeff Braun. Wright continued to innovate on the game's central theme of simulation with numerous other titles including SimEarth and SimAnt.

Wright has earned many awards for his work in game design. He is best known for being the original designer of The Sims series, of which Maxis developed the first entry in 2000. The game spawned multiple sequels, including The Sims 2, The Sims 3, The Sims 4 and their expansion packs. His latest work, Spore, released in September 2008 and features gameplay based upon the model of evolution and scientific advancement. The game sold 406,000 copies within three weeks of its release.

In 2007, he became the first game designer to receive the BAFTA Fellowship, which had previously only been presented to those in the film and television industries.

== Early life and education ==
The son of a plastics engineer and an actress, Wright was born on January 20, 1960, in Atlanta, Georgia. He attended a Montessori school until the age of nine. When his father died of leukemia the same year, Wright moved to Baton Rouge, Louisiana with his mother and his younger sister. He graduated from the Baton Rouge Episcopal High School at the age of 16.

Wright's interest in game design began in childhood with the Chinese strategy board game Go. In his own words, the game has a "simple set of rules" yet "the strategies in it are so complex" and he was "fascinated with the idea that complexity can come out of such simplicity." As a teenager, Wright enjoyed playing board wargames such as PanzerBlitz.

After graduating high school, Wright studied architecture at Louisiana State University for two years. He then transferred to Louisiana Tech where he switched to mechanical engineering, with a particular interest in robotics, space exploration, military history, and language arts. Two years later, in the fall of 1980, he transferred again to The New School in New York City. During this time, he lived in an apartment in Greenwich Village, and spent his free time "searching for spare parts in local electronics surplus stores."

While living in New York City, he purchased an Apple II+ and taught himself Applesoft BASIC, Pascal, and assembly language in order to implement Conway's Game of Life. After one year at the New School, Wright concluded five years of collegiate study without a degree and returned to Baton Rouge.

== Career ==
While other game designers such as Bill Budge and Nasir Gebelli were producing Apple video games, Wright decided to develop for the newer Commodore 64. His first game was the helicopter action game Raid on Bungeling Bay (1984). The gameplay involves the player flying over islands while dropping bombs.

Wright found that he had more fun creating the islands with his level editor for Raid on Bungeling Bay than he had actually playing the game. He created a new game based on this idea that would later evolve into SimCity, but he had trouble finding a publisher. The structuralist dynamics of the game were in part inspired by the work of two architectural and urban theorists, Christopher Alexander and Jay Forrester.

I'm interested in the process and strategies for design. The architect Christopher Alexander, in his book A Pattern Language formalized a lot of spatial relationships into a grammar for design. I'd really like to work toward a grammar for complex systems and present someone with tools for designing complex things.

In an interview with The Times, Wright expressed his belief that computers extend the imagination, and posits the emergence of the "metabrain", stating:

Any human institutional system that draws on the intelligence of all its members is a metabrain. Up to now, we have had high friction between the neurons of the metabrain; technology is lowering that friction tremendously. Computers are allowing us to aggregate our intelligence in ways that were never possible before. If you look at Spore, people are making this stuff, and computers collect it, then decide who to send it to. The computer is the broker. What they are really exploring is the collective creativity of millions of people. They are aggregating human intelligence into a system that is more powerful than we thought artificial intelligence was going to be.

=== Game design ===
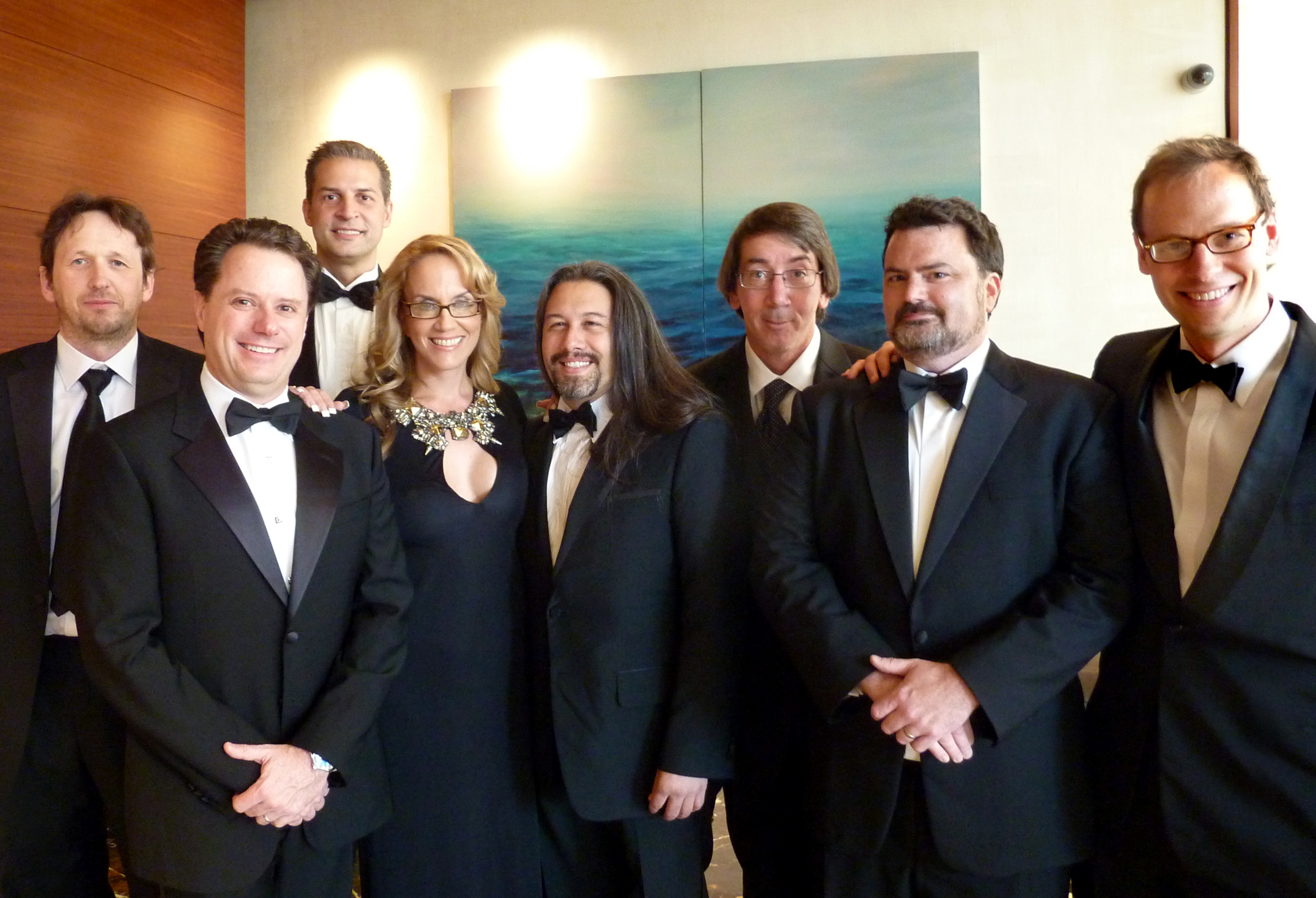
Wright and other game developers at a BAFTA event in Los Angeles in July 2011. From left: Rod Humble, Louis Castle, David Perry, Brenda Brathwaite, John Romero, Will Wright, Tim Schafer, Chris Hecker.

In 1986, Wright met Jeff Braun— an investor interested in entering the computer game industry— at what Wright has called "the world's most important pizza party." Together they formed Maxis the following year in Orinda, California. SimCity (1989) was a hit and has been credited as one of the most influential computer games ever made. Wright himself has been widely featured in several computer magazines—particularly PC Gamer, which has listed Wright in its annual 'Game Gods' feature, alongside such notables as Roberta Williams and Peter Molyneux.

Following the success of SimCity, Wright designed SimEarth (1990) and SimAnt (1991). He co-designed SimCity 2000 (1993) with Fred Haslam and, in the meantime, Maxis produced other "Sim" games. Wright's next game was SimCopter (1996). Although none of these games were as successful as SimCity, they further cemented Wright's reputation as a designer of "software toys"—games that cannot be won or lost, but played indefinitely. In 1992, Wright moved to Walnut Creek, California.

Wright is known for his great interest in complex adaptive systems, with most of his games having been based around them or books that describe them, e.g. SimAnt: E.O. Wilson's The Ants; SimEarth: James Lovelock's Gaia Theory; SimCity: Jay Forrester's Urban Dynamics and World Dynamics; Spore: Drake's Equation and Powers of Ten. Wright's role in the development of concepts from simulations to games is to empower the players by creating what he dubs "possibility spaces", or simple rules which combine with game elements to form complex designs. All games that Wright had a hand in designing adhere to these design principles.

Maxis went public in 1995 with revenue of US$38 million. The stock reached $50 a share and then dropped as Maxis posted a loss. EA bought Maxis in June 1997.

After losing his home in the Oakland firestorm of 1991, Wright was inspired to turn the experience of rebuilding his life into a game. He began developing an idea of a virtual doll house, similar to SimCity but with focus on individual people. This idea would evolve into The Sims, which was based on Wright's firsthand experience rebuilding and furnishing his home. The game was originally conceived of as an architectural design game called Home Tactics, though Wright's idea changed when someone suggested the home should be rated on the quality-of-life experience by virtual homeowners. Themes such as carpentry, home construction, and bare ground in need of landscaping are common throughout the game.

The board at Maxis was not interested in the idea, but Wright found an unlikely publisher in Electronic Arts, who was impressed by Wright's work on SimCity and saw potential for the Sim franchise. EA published The Sims in February 2000 and it became Wright's biggest success at the time. It eventually surpassed Myst as the best-selling computer game of all time and spawned numerous expansion packs and spin-offs. He designed a massively multiplayer version of the game called The Sims Online, which was not as popular as the original. By November 2006, the Sims franchise had earned EA more than a billion dollars.

In a presentation at the Game Developers Conference on March 11, 2005, Wright announced his latest game Spore. He used the current work on this game to demonstrate methods that can be used to reduce the amount of content that needs to be created by the game developers. Wright hopes to inspire others to take risks in game creation.

As for his theories on interactive design, Wright has said:

Well, one thing I've always really enjoyed is making things. Out of whatever. It started with modeling as a kid, building models. When computers came along, I started learning programming and realizing the computer was this great tool for making things, making models, dynamic models, and behaviors, not just static models. I think when I started doing games I really wanted to carry that to the next step, to the player, so that you give the player a tool so that they can create things. And then you give them some context for that creation. You know, what is it, what kind of kind of world does it live in, what's its purpose? What are you trying to do with this thing that you're creating? To really put the player in the design role. And the actual world is reactive to their design. So they design something that the little world inside the computer reacts to. And then they have to revisit the design and redesign it, or tear it down and build another one, whatever it is. So I guess what really draws me to interactive entertainment and the thing that I try to keep focused on is enabling the creativity of the player. Giving them a pretty large solution space to solve the problem within the game. So the game represents this problem landscape. Most games have small solution landscapes, so there's one possible solution and one way to solve it. Other games, the games that tend to be more creative, have a much larger solution space, so you can potentially solve this problem in a way that nobody else has. If you're building a solution, how large that solution space is gives the player a much stronger feeling of empathy. If they know that what they've done is unique to them, they tend to care for it a lot more. I think that's the direction I tend to come from.

Wright has said that he believes that simulations, as games, can be used to improve education by teaching children how to learn. In his own words:

The problem with our education system is we've taken this kind of narrow, reductionist, Aristotelian approach to what learning is. It's not designed for experimenting with complex systems and navigating your way through them in an intuitive way, which is what games teach. It's not really designed for failure, which is also something games teach. I mean, I think that failure is a better teacher than success. Trial and error, reverse-engineering stuff in your mind—all the ways that kids interact with games—that's the kind of thinking schools should be teaching. And I would argue that as the world becomes more complex, and as outcomes become less about success or failure, games are better at preparing you. The education system is going to realize this sooner or later. It's starting. Teachers are entering the system who grew up playing games. They're going to want to engage with the kids using games.

=== Post-Maxis career ===
After building his reputation as one of the most important game designers in the world, Wright left Maxis in 2009. His first post-EA venture was the Stupid Fun Club startup company and experimental entertainment development studio, with a focus on "video games, online environments, storytelling media, and fine home care products", as well as toys.

In October 2010, Current TV announced that Will Wright and his team from Stupid Fun Club will produce a new show for the network. The program, entitled Bar Karma, began airing in February 2011, and featured scenes and twists pitched by an online community, using an online story creator tool designed by Wright. Stupid Fun Club ran for four years before closing down, with much of the team following Wright to found the social media app and graphic novel builder Thred.

In October 2011, Will Wright became a member of the board of directors of Linden Lab, the creators of Second Life.

At the Game Developers Conference in March 2018, Will Wright announced a new project, aimed at PC, PlayStation 5 and Xbox Series X/S called Proxi.

At GalaVerse on December 11, 2021, Wright announced a new project, in partnership with Gala Games, called VoxVerse. Wright said VoxVerse will be a blockchain game, where players will be able to create areas to explore and interact with and share these with other players of the game, incentivizing creators through the ability to trade or sell their works as non-fungible tokens (NFTs) using cryptocurrency. Wright stated that the use of blockchain and NFTs are mechanisms needed to support the vision he has, but has no interest in selling NFTs directly to players as other blockchain games or NFT schemes have had done in the past. He likened it to early players in The Sims that found ways to modify the game to include their own creation. The game is being developed by Gallium Games, a studio he co-founded with Lauren Elliott, and being created in the Unity engine.

=== Awards ===
Wright was given a "Lifetime Achievement Award" at the Game Developers Choice Awards in 2001. In 2002, he became the fifth person to be inducted into the Academy of Interactive Arts and Sciences' Hall of Fame. Until 2006, he was the only person to have been honored this way by both of these industry organizations. In 2007 the British Academy of Film and Television Arts awarded him a fellowship, the first given to a game designer.

He has been called one of the most important people in gaming, technology, and entertainment by publications such as Entertainment Weekly, Time, PC Gamer, Discover and GameSpy. Wright was also awarded the PC Magazine Lifetime Achievement Award in January 2005. Later that year, Wright earned the Ivan Allen Jr. Prize for Progress and Service awarded by the Georgia Institute of Technology. He delivered a forward looking acceptance speech entitled "Stealth Communities".

== Personal life ==
Wright lives in Oakland, California. He is an atheist. In 1984, he married artist Joell Jones, with whom he had a child named Cassidy in 1986. The family lost their home and most records of Wright's early career in the Oakland firestorm of 1991. Wright and Jones separated in 2008. He has since married Anya Zavarzina.

Wright is on the board of trustees of the X Prize Foundation, a non-profit organization that designs and hosts public competitions intended to encourage technological development to benefit humanity. Amid the 2008 United States presidential election, Wright donated to the campaigns of Rudy Giuliani and later John McCain.

=== Hobbies ===
In 1980, along with co-driver and race organizer Rick Doherty, Wright participated in the U.S. Express, a cross-country race that was the successor to The Cannonball Run. Wright and Doherty drove a specially outfitted Mazda RX-7 from Brooklyn, New York to Santa Monica, California in 33:39, winning the illegal race. Wright only competed once in the race, which continued until 1983.

I'm uncollecting. I buy collections on ebay, and I disperse them out to people again. I have to be like an entropic force to collectors, otherwise all of this stuff will get sorted.

Since 2003, in his spare time, Wright has collected leftovers from the Soviet space program, "including a 100 pounds (45 kg) hatch from a space shuttle, a seat from a Soyuz ... control panels from the Mir", and the control console of the Soyuz 23, as well as dolls, dice, and fossils.

Wright used to build competitive robots for BattleBots with his daughter, but no longer does. As of November 2006, Wright still had remnant bits of machined metal left over from his BattleBots days strewn about the garage of his home. Following his work in BattleBots, he has taken steps into the field of human-robot interactions:

We build these robots and we take them down to Berkeley and study the interactions that people have with the robots... We built this newer one that has a rapid-fire pingpong cannon. It will fire about 10 per second. So we give people this plastic bat and we say, "It's set up to play baseball. Do you want to play baseball? It's going to shoot a little ball and you try to hit it." And all of a sudden it's like da-da-da-da, and it's pelting them with balls.

Wright was a former Robot Wars champion in the Stupid Fun Club, a Berkeley-based robotics workshop. "Kitty Puff Puff", one of Wright's bots designed with the help of his daughter Cassidy, fought against its opponents by sticking a roll of tape onto its armature and circling around them, encapsulating them and denying them movement. The technique, "cocooning", was eventually banned.

== Games ==
Year	Title	Developer
1984	Raid on Bungeling Bay	Will Wright
1989	SimCity	Maxis
1990	SimEarth	Maxis
1991	SimAnt	Maxis
1992	SimLife	Maxis
1993	SimCity 2000	Maxis
1996	SimCopter	Maxis
2000	The Sims	Maxis
2002	The Sims Online	Maxis
2008	Spore	Maxis
2008	Spore Creature Creator	Maxis
TBA	Proxi	Gallium Studios
