= Spore Galactic Adventures =

- Developer: Maxis Emeryville
- Publisher: Electronic Arts
- Producer: Kip Katsarelis
- Designer: Stone Librande
- Programmer: Benjamin Thompson
- Artists: Michael A. Khoury; Ocean Quigley
- Writer: Philip Campbell
- Composer: Kent Jolly
- Platforms: Windows, Mac OS X
- Release: NA: June 23, 2009; PAL: June 25, 2009; UK: June 26, 2009
- Genres: Life simulation, real-time strategy
- Mode: Single-player

Spore Galactic Adventures is an expansion pack for the multigenre game Spore, developed by Maxis Emeryville and published by Electronic Arts. The US version of the game was released on June 23, 2009. The European version was released on June 26, 2009.

== Gameplay ==
The main feature added to the game is the Adventure Creator. This Creator allows players to create various missions, which are then populated into the Space stage in a manner similar to the other content created in the original game. Players add elements to the adventure by dragging them from a menu and dropping them into the world. Creatures, vehicles and buildings created using the game's other editors can be selected and placed throughout the world. The player can also set creatures' behaviors from aggressive to friendly, and add speech bubbles. In addition, fixed objects from the previous stages of Spore, as well as gameplay objects like bombs and teleporters, can be added to the game.

Players can select a range of special effects and drop them into the level. Sounds can be added to the game in the same manner, although new sound files cannot be added to the game. A complexity meter exists to prevent too many objects being dropped into the game; it also enables the player to beam down and experience a planet firsthand rather than exploring it with a holographic projection.

Complementing the Adventure Creator is the Planet Creator, which is accessed from within the Adventure Creator. Players select a prebuilt planet and then edit it in a manner similar to the Adventure Creator. Elements such as temperature and atmospheric density can be adjusted using sliders. The planet's terrain is modified using terrain stamps, which are dragged and dropped from the interface. Like the Adventure Creator, a complexity meter exists to prevent too many elements being used to create the planet.

The expansion also adds a Captain Outfitter, which allows players to modify their Space stage creatures by giving them different social tools, weapons, and gear. They are then able to beam down their captains to specialized planets that have missions on them. Missions are greatly varied and may require a range of different tools. RPG elements also exist in the game, in that captains earn points from missions and are able to level up.

=== Adventure mode ===
Players can take their space captains on adventures, with each adventure having a specific goal to complete. There are a variety of adventure types, such as saving a planet from the Grox or helping a famous pop star get to his show on time. Completing each adventure awards the space captain experience points much like a role-playing video game and allows the player to choose a piece of equipment for their space captain. As a space captain gains more experience it gets better titles (determined by his empire's beliefs) such as "Thug", "Profiteer", or "Gatherer"; these titles are based on the Captain's archetype.

== Development ==
A space-based expansion pack was first announced mid-October 2008 alongside the Creepy and Cute parts pack. On June 9, 2009, the Spore website was redesigned to prepare for a Galactic Adventure.

== Reception ==
Reception

Aggregate score
Aggregator	Score
Metacritic	70%

Review scores
Publication	Score
1Up.com	B
Eurogamer	7/10
GameSpot	8.0/10
GameSpy	4/5
IGN	7.7/10
MacLife	3/5

Spore: Galactic Adventures gained generally positive reviews according to Metacritic.com. It was praised for its adventure creator which was seen as complex yet easy to use.
