= Evolution: The Game of Intelligent Life =

1997 video game

- Developer: Crossover Technologies
- Publisher: NA: Interplay Entertainment Discovery Channel Multimedia
- Designer: Greg Costikyan
- Platform: Windows
- Release: NA: December 1, 1997
- Genres: Educational; Life simulation Real-time strategy
- Modes: Single-player; Multiplayer (1-6)

Evolution: The Game of Intelligent Life is a life simulation and real-time strategy computer game that allows players to experience, guide, and control evolution from an isometric view on either historical earth or on randomly generated worlds while racing against computer opponents to reach the top of the evolution chain, and gradually evolving the player's animals to reach the "grand goal of intelligent life". It was published by Interplay Entertainment and Discovery Channel Multimedia in 1997.

== Gameplay ==
The objective of Evolution is to assume the role of a prehistoric species and evolve into one capable of sentient intelligence. Players can select scenarios with different historical lengths, with the full game spanning a 360 million year period starting from the Carboniferous era. Games are played with up to five opponents, either by the computer or with other players using the Internet or a local area network.

== Development and release ==
Evolution was developed by New York based studio Crossover Technologies and published by Discovery Channel Multimedia. The game was conceived by Alan Roireau, a former developer for Microprose and Avalon Hill. Lead designer Greg Costikyan stated that the publisher engaged Crossover Technologies to create a strategy game about evolution in 1996.

== Critical reception ==
Reception

Review scores
Publication	Score
Computer Games Strategy Plus	4/5
Computer Gaming World	1.5/5
GameSpot	6/10

Evolution received generally favorable reviews upon release.

Inside Games thought it was an "excellent simulation", and that it was "one of those rare edutainment titles that succeeds as entertainment, too".

Electric Play felt the game was both "educational" and "interesting", giving the game an overall review score of 80%.

Happy Puppy thought the game had much replay value, and gave the game an overall positive review.

Pyramid stated that "Evolution shares the Discovery success strategy for straddling the road between education and entertainment. It's fun, and I actually learned something."
