= List of god games =

See Lists of video games for related lists.

This is a comprehensive index of god games, sorted chronologically. Information regarding date of release, developer, platform, setting and notability is provided when available. The table can be sorted by clicking on the small boxes next to the column headings.

== Legend ==
Video game platforms
AMI	Amiga	APPII	Apple II family	AQUA	Mattel Aquarius
ARC	Acorn Archimedes	ATRST	Atari ST, Atari Falcon	C64	Commodore 64
CPC	Amstrad CPC	DOS	DOS / MS-DOS, Windows 3.X	DROID	Android
DS	Nintendo DS, DSiWare, iQue DS	DUO	TurboDuo / PC Engine Duo	GB	Game Boy
GCN	GameCube	GEN	Sega Genesis / Mega Drive	INT	Intellivision
iOS	iOS, iPhone, iPod, iPadOS, iPad, visionOS, Apple Vision Pro	LIN	Linux	MAC	Classic Mac OS, 2001 and before
MOBI	Mobile phone	N64	Nintendo 64, iQue Player	NS	Nintendo Switch
OSX	macOS	PC98	PC-9800 series	PCE	TurboGrafx-16 / PC Engine
PET	Commodore PET	PS1	PlayStation 1	PS2	PlayStation 2
PS4	PlayStation 4	PSN	PlayStation Network	Quest	Meta Quest / Oculus Quest family, including Oculus Rift
SAT	Sega Saturn	SCD	Sega CD / Mega CD	SMS	Sega Master System
SNES	Super Nintendo / Super; Famicom / Super Comboy	TRS80	TRS-80	Wii	Wii, WiiWare, Wii Virtual Console
WIN	Microsoft Windows, all versions Windows 95 and up	WMO	Windows Mobile	XB360	Xbox 360, Xbox 360 Live Arcade
X68K	X68000	ZX	ZX Spectrum		

Types of releases
Compilation	A compilation, anthology or collection of several titles, usually (but not always) belonging to the same series
Early access	A game launched in early access is unfinished and thus might contain bugs and glitches or have some of the content missing
Episodic	An episodic video game that is released in batches over a period of time
Expansion	A large-scale DLC to an already existing game that adds new story, areas and additions and/or changes to the game's mechanics
Full release	A full release of a game that launched in early access first
Limited	A special release (often called "Limited" or "Collector's Edition") with bonus collector's material. Often provided to people who pre-order a game
Port	The game first appeared on a different platform and a port was made. The game is like the original, with few or no differences
Remake	The game is an enhanced remake of an original, made using new engine and/or assets and thus containing completely new sound, graphics and possibly changes to the story and/or gameplay
Remaster	The game is a remaster of an original, released on the same or different platform, with minor changes to graphics, sound and/or gameplay
Rerelease	The game was re-released on the same platform with no or only minor changes

== List ==
Year	Title	Developer	Setting	Platform	Notes
1978	Santa Paravia en Fiumaccio	George Blank	Historical	APPII, PET, TRS80	First appeared in the December 1978 issue of SoftSide magazine for the Radio Shack TRS-80.
1982	Utopia	Don Daglow	Contemporary	AQUA, INT	
1985	Little Computer People	David Crane	Contemporary	AMI, APPII, C64, CPC, ATRST, ZX	
1986	Alter Ego	Peter J. Favaro	Contemporary	APPII, C64, DOS, MAC, iOS	
1989	Populous	Bullfrog	Fantasy	AMI, ARC, DOS, DS, GB, GEN, MAC, PC98, PCE, SMS, SNES, ATRST, X68K	
1990	SimEarth: The Living Planet	Maxis	Nature	AMI, DUO, DOS, MAC, PCE, SCD, SNES, WIN, X68K	
1990	Powermonger	Bullfrog	Fantasy	AMI, DOS, GEN, MAC, PC98, SCD, SNES, ATRST	
1990	ActRaiser	Quintet	Fantasy	MOBI, SNES, Wii	Hybrid with side-scrolling platform game.
1991	Populous II: Trials of the Olympian Gods	Bullfrog	Fantasy	AMI, DOS, GEN, MAC, PC98, SNES, ATRST	Sequel to Populous.
1991	Mega Lo Mania (also known as Tyrants: Fight Through Time)	Sensible	Fantasy	AMI, DOS, GEN, SNES, ATRST	
1992	SimLife: The Genetic Playground	Maxis	Nature	AMI, DOS, MAC	The player controls the evolution of creatures.
1994	Fortress	F1	Fantasy	AMI	
1995	Baldies	Atari Corporation	Fantasy	PS1, SAT	
1996	Afterlife	LucasArts	Fantasy	DOS, MAC, WIN	
1996	Creatures	Creature Labs	Fantasy	WIN, MAC	
1997	Theme Hospital	Bullfrog	Simulation	DOS, PS1	
1997	Dungeon Keeper	Bullfrog	Fantasy	DOS, WIN	First title in the series.
1997	Dungeon Keeper: The Deeper Dungeons	Bullfrog	Fantasy	WIN	Expansion to Dungeon Keeper.
1997	Evolution: The Game of Intelligent Life	Crossover	Nature	WIN	A simulation of species evolution.
1998	Creatures 2	Creature Labs	Fantasy	WIN	Sequel to Creatures.
1998	Populous: The Beginning	Bullfrog	Fantasy	PS1, PSN, WIN	Sequel to Populous II: Trials of the Olympian Gods.
1998	Skull Caps	Ubisoft	Fantasy	WIN	
1999	Creatures 3	Creature Labs	Fantasy	WIN, LIN	Sequel to Creatures.
1999	Doshin the Giant	Param, Nintendo	Fantasy	GCN, N64	
1999	Dungeon Keeper 2	Bullfrog	Fantasy	WIN	Sequel to Dungeon Keeper.
2000	Kyojin no Doshin Kaihō Sensen Chibikko Chikko Daishūgō	Param	Fantasy	N64	Expansion to Doshin the Giant.
2000	Majesty: The Fantasy Kingdom Sim	Cyberlore	Fantasy	LIN, MAC, WIN	
2001	Black & White	Lionhead	Fantasy	MAC, WIN	First title in the series.
2001	Docking Station	Creature Labs	Fantasy	WIN, LIN	Sequel to Creatures
2001	Startopia	Mucky Foot Productions	Sci-Fi	WIN	A space station sim.
2002	Black & White: Creature Isle	Lionhead	Fantasy	MAC, WIN	Expansion to Black & White.
2005	Black & White 2	Lionhead	Fantasy	OSX, WIN	Sequel to Black & White.
2006	Viva Piñata	Rare	Fantasy	WIN, XB360	A simulation where players manage a garden to attract and mate piñata animals.
2006	Black & White 2: Battle of the Gods	Lionhead	Fantasy	OSX, WIN	Expansion to Black & White 2.
2007	Seaman 2: Pekin Genjin Ikusei Kit	Sega	Fantasy	PS2	
2008	Spore	Maxis	Nature/Sci-Fi	OSX, WIN	Simulates the life and evolution of species from a cell to a space civilization on a fictional galaxy.
2009	Pocket God	Bolt Creative	Fantasy	iOS, DROID, WMO	
2009	Pocket Devil	Eyedip	Fantasy	iOS	Clone of Pocket God
2009	Majesty 2: The Fantasy Kingdom Sim	1C:Ino-Co	Fantasy	OSX, WIN	Sequel to Majesty: The Fantasy Kingdom Sim.
2010	GodFinger	Wonderland Software	Fantasy/Simulation	iOS	
2011	From Dust	Ubisoft, Eric Chahi	Nature	XB360, WIN, PSN	Nature simulation game where players control and model nature in order to save a human tribe from extinction.
2012	WorldBox	Maxim Karpenko	Indie/Fantasy	WIN, OSX, LIN, iOS, DROID	2D simulation of worlds and civilizations that let's player have full control over the world
2013	Reus	Abbey Games	Nature/Fantasy	WIN	A 2D god game where the player controls nature giants to balance human progression.
2013	Godus	22cans	Fantasy	WIN, OSX, iOS, DROID	Spiritual successor to Populous.
2013	Thrive	Revolutionary Games Studio	Nature	WIN, OSX, LIN	A 2D/3D open source spiritual successor to Spore, focusing more on scientific accuracy
2015	War for the Overworld	Subterranean Games	Fantasy	WIN, OSX, LIN	Spiritual successor to Dungeon Keeper 2.
2018	Crest	Eat Create Sleep	Fantasy	WIN, OSX, LIN	
2018	Everything	David OReilly	Simulation	WIN, OSX, LIN, PS4, NS	
2018	The Universim	Crytivo Games	Indie/Simulation	WIN, OSX, LIN	A planet management game where the player takes the role of "God" and guides the development of civilisation.
2019	Rise to Ruins	Raymond Doerr	Fantasy	WIN, OSX, LIN	
2022	Deisim	Myron Software	Fantasy	WIN, Quest	Virtual reality game where you play as the god help or destroy the development of humankind.
2024	Gods Against Machines	Silver Eye Studios	Fantasy, Sci-fi	WIN	Play as a god over a fantasy race vs machines using RTS rules.
2024	Reus 2	Abbey Games	Nature/Fantasy	WIN	Sequel to Reus
