= BootSkin =

Computer program to change screen display while the computer is booting

BootSkins are often available for popular games. This Creatures skin uses a limited palette to enhance the impression of warmth.

BootSkin is a computer program for Microsoft Windows 2000, Windows XP and Windows Vista that allows users to change the screen displayed while the operating system is booting. It is made by Stardock, and distributed for free under the WinCustomize brand.

BootSkin uses a boot-time device driver (vidstub.sys) to access the display directly using VESA BIOS Extensions (VBE), unlike other bootscreen changers which alter the boot screen image inside the kernel. This has the advantage of not modifying system files, and makes higher-resolution boot screens possible; standard boot screens are limited to 640x480 with 16 colors. Some graphics cards and chipsets do not support VBE well, preventing their use with BootSkin.

Due to severe restrictions on color depth, many images are not suitable for use as boot skins. Successful skins tend to take advantage of the limitations through the use of a limited palette and dithering.

Installing BootSkin unattended is simple matter of using the /silent switch, but there does not seem to be any way of applying a skin without actually clicking the apply button in the program
