= CyberLife =

CyberLife may refer to:

- CyberLife Technology, later Creatures Labs, developer of the Creatures series of artificial life video games
- CyberLife, a fictional android design and manufacturing corporation in the video game Detroit: Become Human
- Cyberlife, a DJ and producer of deep Electronic Music
