= Steve Grand (roboticist) =

British computer scientist and roboticist

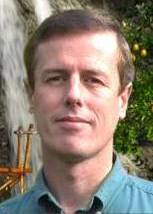
- Born: 12 February 1958 (age 68)
- Occupations: Computer scientist; roboticist
- Awards: Order of the British Empire (2000)
- Website: grandroids.com

Steve Grand OBE (born 12 February 1958) is a British computer scientist and roboticist. He was the creator and lead programmer of the Creatures artificial life simulation, which he discussed in his first book Creation: Life and How to Make It, a finalist for the 2001 Aventis Prize for Science Books. He is also an Officer of the Most Excellent Order of the British Empire, which he received in 2000.

Grand's project from 2001 to 2006 was the building of an artificial robot baby orangutan, with the intention of having it learn as a human baby would. This is documented in his book Growing up with Lucy.

== Projects ==
Creatures

One of the best known projects created by Steve Grand is Creatures, an artificial life simulation with biochemistry, neurology with learning algorithms and inheritable digital DNA, which his company Cyberlife Technology released in the 1996. It was the first in a series of games.

Lucy, the Android

His project from 2001 to 2005 was Lucy, a mechanical baby orangutan. Lucy was an attempt at simulating the mind of a human baby.

Sim-biosis

Grand worked on Sim-biosis, a computer simulation game in which complete artificial creatures could be built from functional, structural units. It is available on SourceForge under the name Simergy.

Grandroids

In February 2011, Grand announced a new project, Grandroids, described as "real 'alien' life forms who can live in a virtual world on your computer". In September 2024, the project was renamed to Phantasia, and the progress updates were made public.

== Bibliography ==
- Creation: Life and How to Make It (2001) ISBN 0-7538-1277-0
- Growing Up with Lucy (2004) ISBN 0-297-60733-2
- What is the Secret of Consciousness? (2014) TEDx Oporto presentation
