= Baldies =

1995 video game

- Developer: Creative Edge Software
- Publishers: Atari Corporation: PC; NA: Panasonic Interactive Media; EU: Sold-Out Software; JP: Banpresto PlayStation; JP: Banpresto; EU: Phoenix Games B.V.; NA: Mud Duck Productions Saturn; JP: Banpresto Macintosh; JP: Banpresto
- Producers: Faran Thomason; Larry Pacey; Vince Zampella
- Designer: David Wightman
- Programmer: David Wightman
- Artists: Alan Duncan; David Brown; Paul Docherty
- Platforms: Atari Jaguar CD, PC, PlayStation, Sega Saturn, Macintosh
- Release: December 1995: Jaguar CD; EU/NA: December 1995 PC; NA: 28 November 1996; EU: 13 February 1998; JP: 4 December 1998 PlayStation; JP: 19 November 1998; EU: 8 August 2003; NA: 3 October 2003 Sega Saturn; JP: 26 November 1998 Macintosh; JP: 4 December 1998
- Genres: Construction and management simulation, god game, real-time strategy
- Modes: Single-player, multiplayer

Baldies is a 1995 real-time strategy video game developed by Creative Edge Software and originally published by Atari Corporation for the Atari Jaguar CD. It was later ported to the PC, PlayStation, Sega Saturn, and Macintosh. In the game, the player manages a community of Baldies in order to build structures, increase their population, and create weapons to fight against enemies known as Hairies. There are four classes of Baldies and each structure has specific properties to assist the player. Its gameplay combines strategy with simulation and god game elements. Up to four players can participate in a multiplayer mode via local area network (LAN) on PC.

Baldies began production in 1993 for the Amiga platform, intended to be published first by Mindscape and then by GameTek. It was spearheaded by Creative Edge founder David Wightman, who served as lead programmer and designer. Wightman designed the game's concept to have the depth of the god game Populous (1989) and accessibility of the puzzle–strategy game Lemmings (1991). The original Amiga version received a demo published as covermount with an issue of CU Amiga magazine, but was never published until it was ported and finished on Jaguar CD. Ports for 3DO Interactive Multiplayer and Amiga CD32 began development but were never released. The game garnered generally favorable reception from critics; praise was given to its novel style and level of gameplay freedom given to players, though the simplistic graphics, learning curve, and controls were a point of contention for reviewers. It was followed by Skull Caps (1998).

== Gameplay ==
Baldies is a real-time strategy game with simulation and god game elements that is primarily played from a top-down perspective, similar to SimCity, Populous, Lemmings, and Mega-Lo-Mania. The main objective is to advance the Baldies' civilization across 100 levels, each one taking place across various locations and increasing in difficulty. The player has god-like powers capable of changing the outcome of Baldies. They interact with the game's world and manage a community of Baldies using a hand cursor in order to build structures, increase their population, and create weapons to fight against enemies known as Hairies. The player does not have full direct control of the Baldies themselves and their actions or movement. Instead, they will wander around the playfield until they are picked up with the hand.

Atari Jaguar CD version screenshot

The player can assign Baldies one of four job classes, indicated by the color of clothing representing their current role. The role of all Baldies can be changed by dropping them into the corresponding room of a house. Dropping Baldies into a house's bedroom is the only way to breed more Baldies. Red Baldies are workers that generate energy to terraform the playfield. Once four big houses are constructed, they can grow angel wings that let them fly. Blue Baldies act as builders of houses, barracks or laboratories. They can prevent structures from falling apart during a disaster. Grey Baldies function as soldiers to fight against Hairies. They can be equipped with weapons outside of barracks. White Baldies work as scientists at laboratories, making weapons and inventions by experimenting with animals that roam the playfield. Each structure has specific properties to assist the player. Without any kind of structure, the player is incapable of breeding Baldies, develop inventions or fabricate ammunition.

There are hazards and traps scattered across the playfield that can prove beneficial or harmful to the Baldies and Hairies alike. The player can use environmental objects on the playfield like trees to hide Baldies for strategic purposes against Hairies. The game is over if all Baldies on the playfield are defeated by Hairies. Progress is manually saved after completing a level if a Memory Track cartridge is present, but the player can otherwise play through the game using passwords in the Atari Jaguar CD version. The PlayStation and Sega Saturn versions support memory cards to save progress. The Jaguar CD version came bundled with a controller overlay and features support for the ProController, while the PlayStation and Saturn versions feature support for the PlayStation Mouse and Shuttle Mouse respectively. In the PC version, up to four players can participate in a multiplayer mode via local area network (LAN), where the last unit standing is the winner of the match.

== Development ==
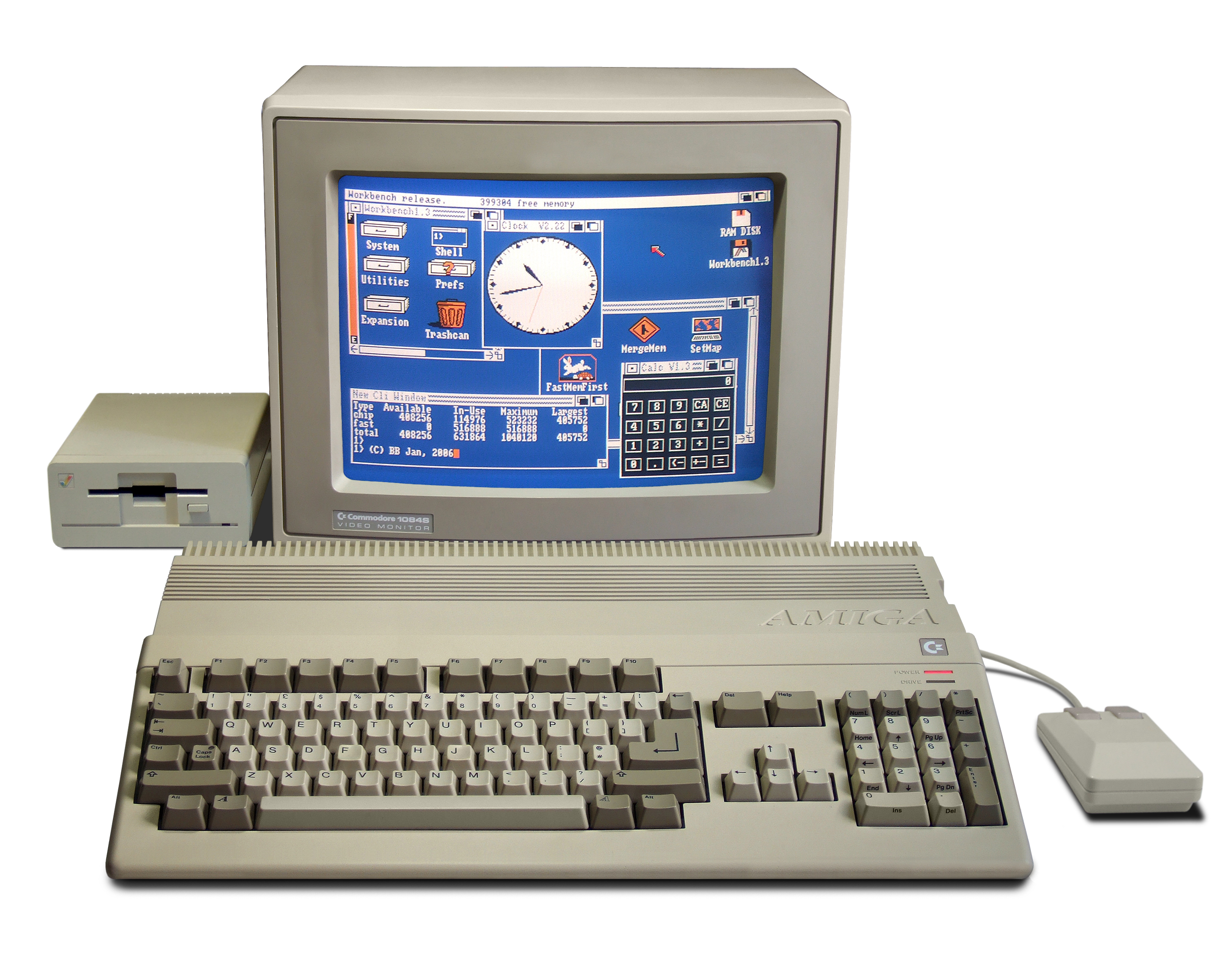
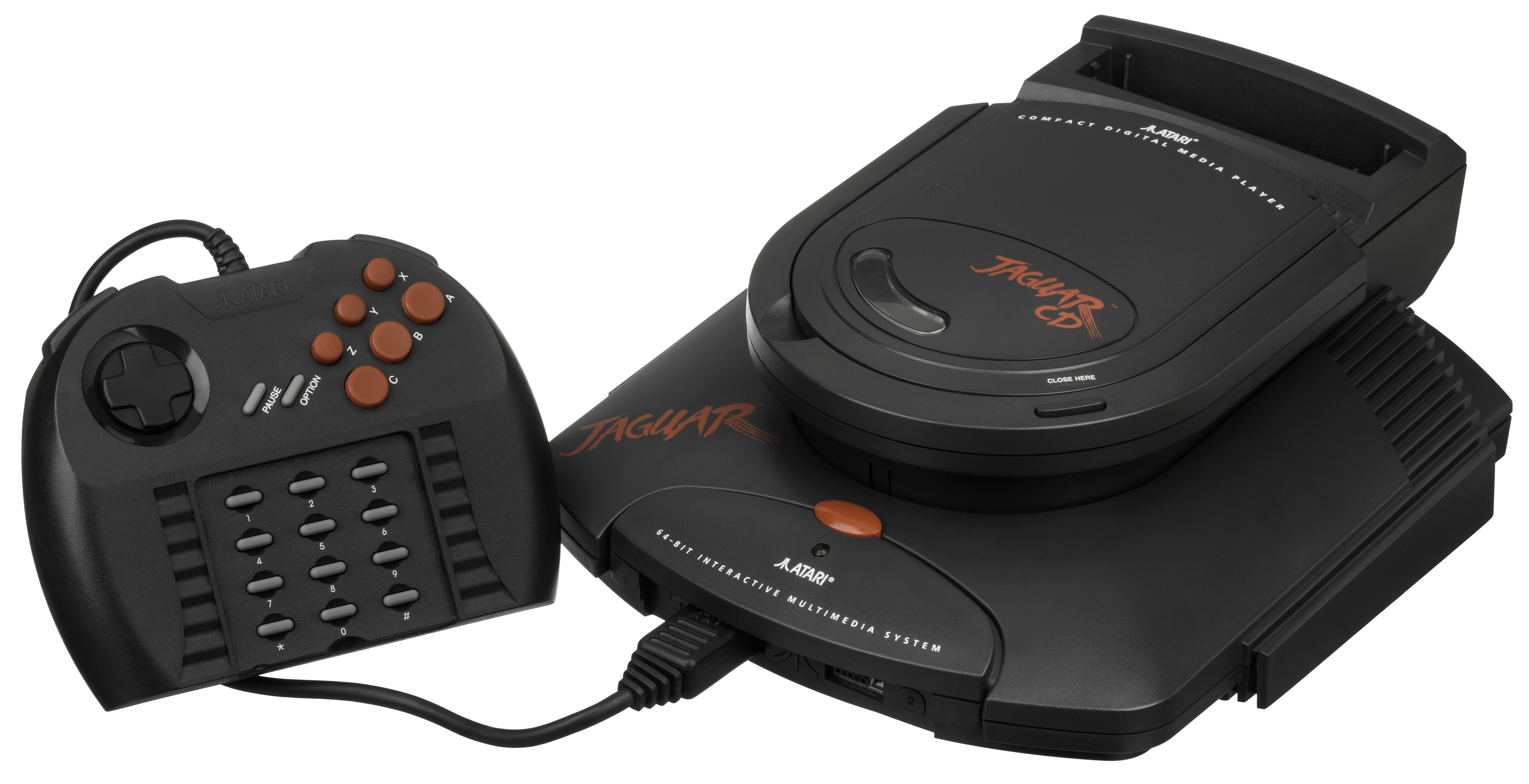
Baldies began its development in 1993 as an Amiga project before being transferred and finished on Atari Jaguar CD

Baldies was created by Creative Edge Software, an Edinburgh-based game developer founded by David Wightman in 1989. Creative Edge had previously worked on titles such as Euro Soccer (1992), an adaptation based on the 1993 family comedy film Surf Ninjas for Amiga, and Soccer Superstars (1995). It was co-produced by Faran Thomason, Larry Pacey, and Vince Zampella of Atari Corporation. Wightman served as the game's lead programmer and designer, with technical manager David Elliott as well as Daniel Leyden, Duncan McDinhln, and former Imagitec Design staffer Sean Connolly providing additional hardware and programming support. Alan Duncan, David Brown, and Paul Docherty were responsible for the artwork.

Baldies began production in February 1993 for the Amiga platform, intended to be published first by Mindscape and then by GameTek. Wightman designed the game's concept from scratch to have the gameplay depth of the god game Populous (1989) and accessibility of the puzzle–strategy game Lemmings (1991). Wightman described it as a cross between Populous and Lemmings, as well as SimCity (1989) and the real-time strategy game Mega-Lo-Mania (1991). The claymation cutscenes were produced in-house by Creative Edge. The Amiga version received a demo that was published as covermount with the May 1995 issue of CU Amiga magazine, but was never published until it was ported and finished on Atari Jaguar CD. According to Wightman, Creative Edge obtained development kits for Jaguar from Atari, converting and rewritting 90% of assembly code from the Amiga version to work with the Jaguar's architecture. Wightman stated that the game was intended to be bundled with a mouse peripheral, as Atari was clearing out their ST mouse inventory, but had to be released without it as mouse support for the game was not completed in time.

== Release ==
Baldies was first announced for Atari Jaguar CD at the 1995 ECTS Spring event. It was showcased at E3 1995 and initially scheduled for a Q2 1995 launch window, then for an August 1995 release date, and later slated for a vague late 1995 release. The title was covered during an event where the press was invited to Atari and showcased at another event hosted by Atari dubbed "Fun 'n' Games Day". It was published in North America and Europe in December 1995, being the smallest game released for Jaguar CD in terms of memory size (at 75 MB). Ports for 3DO Interactive Multiplayer and Amiga CD32 were also in development alongside the Amiga version, but neither version were ever released.

A PC port was first set to be published by Atari Interactive before the division closed down in May 1996, and was instead published in North America by Panasonic Interactive Media on 28 November 1996. To market the game, Panasonic set up a campaign tour of bald promoters distributing free demos in New York. The PC port was then published in Europe by Sold-Out Software on 13 February 1998. Banpresto later distributed PC and Macintosh versions in Japan under the title Baldy Land (Note: ボールディランド (Bōrudi Rando)) on 4 December 1998, as well as a trial version for Microsoft Windows. A PlayStation port was first published in Japan by Banpresto on 19 November 1998, then later in Europe by Phoenix Games on 8 August 2003, and in North America by Mud Duck Productions on 3 October 2003. A Sega Saturn port was only released in Japan by Banpresto on 26 November 1998. In 2006, the game's trademark renewal was cancelled.

== Reception ==
Reception

Review scores
Publication	Score
Electronic Gaming Monthly	(JAGCD) 9/10, 8/10, 8.5/10, 8.5/10
GameRevolution	(PC) B+
GameSpot	(PC) 6.5/10
M! Games	(JAGCD) 70%
Next Generation	(JAGCD) 3/5
PC Zone	(PC) 61%
Adrenaline Vault	(PC) 3/5
Atari Gaming Headquarters	(JAGCD) 7/10
Coming Soon Magazine	(PC) 82%
Gamezilla	(PC) 93/100
PC Entertainment	(PC) 4/5
Power Play	(PC) 48.5% (Note: Average of two scores: 48% for single-player and 49% for multiplayer.)
Secret Service	(PC) 7/10
ST Magazine	(JAGCD) 77%
VideoGames	(JAGCD) 6/10

Baldies garnered generally favorable reception from critics. VideoGames compared the game with Cannon Fodder (1993) and noted its advanced artificial intelligence, but found the claymation sequences to be bleak. Next Generation highlighted its "cute" graphics, numerous levels, and novel premise. They also found its greatest strength to be the freedom of gameplay, which allows the player to delegate responsibilities any way they like among the baldies or enjoy the unpredictability of what they come up with when given only general guidance. Marc Abramson of the French ST Magazine commended the game's easy controls, sympathetic sounds, help system, thematic, and longevity, but faulted the compressed Wallace and Gromit-style introductory sequence and lamented the lack of a two-player mode.

Electronic Gaming Monthly's four reviewers deemed the graphics as mediocre and the controls difficult to get used to, but said that the game was "a step in the right direction" for the Jaguar, citing its gameplay and amusing tactics for defeating enemies. GamePro said the graphics were excellent and found the simple controls easy to master, but felt the music was too repetitive. MAN!AC's Oliver Ehrle labelled it as a cute Populous clone, citing its varied levels but expressed mixed thoughts regarding the overall audiovisual presentation. PC Entertainment's Christopher Lindquist noted the game's sense of humor and accessible gameplay, but complained about the same objective on every level and lack of additional difficulty levels. GameSpot's Chris Hudak called Baldies "the single weirdest game I have ever played", criticizing the concept as well as its execution.

Coming Soon Magazine's Glenn Soucy praised the game's action, colorful graphics, and detailed structures. Power Play's Sascha Gliss disagreed, saying that it lacked the "playful lightness" that made Populous (1989) accessible. Jim Brumbaugh of the Adrenaline Vault found the visuals and music adequate. He also commended the mouse-driven gameplay for its easy controls but felt the game was lacking in the sound effects department, summarizing that "Baldies is an interesting idea, which could have used a little more 'punch'." PC Zone's Chris Anderson and Richie Shoemaker noted its learning curve and called the visuals dated.

Gamezilla's Mitch Eatough gave the PC version positive remarks for its gameplay, graphical animations, and assortment of sound effects, but lamented the lack of online play in multiplayer mode. Atari Gaming Headquarters' Keita Iida described it as a "chaotic" cross between Populous and Lemmings (1991). Iida said the controls were okay but occasionally difficult when pointing an object due to lack of mouse and trackball controllers on Jaguar. Iida also questioned the game being on the Jaguar CD, writing that it could have been done on cartridge. Author Andy Slaven concurred with Iida regarding the Jaguar's controller not being suited for the game, but ultimately found it to be an entertaining action-strategy title and noted its sense of humor.

== Legacy ==
Baldies was one of several projects by Creative Edge Software planned to be published by Atari for the Jaguar, but was the only one released prior to the platform being discontinued. The others were near completion prior to cancellation: Battle Lords (a Gauntlet-style hack and slash dungeon crawler), Chopper (a Choplifter-esque action game), Green-Thang (a run and gun platform game), and a soccer title. A follow-up title to Baldies named Skull Caps was developed by Creative Edge and published by Ubi Soft in 1999 for Windows.
