= Populous (series) =

- Genre: God game
- Developer: Bullfrog Productions
- Publisher: Electronic Arts
- Creator: Peter Molyneux
- First release: Populous; 1989
- Latest release: Populous DS; 2008

Populous is a series of video games developed by Bullfrog Productions and published by Electronic Arts. The first game in the series, Populous, was released in 1989 for the Amiga. At the time, it was hailed as revolutionary, and it coined the term "god game".

== Gameplay ==
The games involved the player taking on the role of a deity and leading followers into battle against opposing deities, and intervene by using a variety of "divine intervention" that affect the world and indirectly, the people.

The first two games were similar. In Populous and Populous II: Trials of the Olympian Gods, much emphasis was spent on flattening the terrain. The view of the game-world was isometric. Populous: The Beginning was more like a conventional war-game than a god-game and uses true 3D instead of isometric 3D. In Populous: The Beginning, the player is set in the role of a shaman instead of a god, but at the end of the game attains godhood.

In an interview, the series creator Peter Molyneux, said that "Populous was like it was due to my incompetence as a games programmer ... the reason the feature (raise the land) was there was because I couldn't get the little people to navigate around the coast".

== History ==
The series includes:

- Populous (1989)
  - Populous: The Promised Lands (1989)
  - Populous: The Final Frontier (1989)
- Populous II: Trials of the Olympian Gods (1991)
  - Populous II: The Challenge Games (1992)
- Populous: The Beginning (1998)
  - Populous: The Beginning - Undiscovered Worlds (1999)
- Populous DS (2008)

== Reception ==
In 1996, Next Generation listed the series as number 16 on their "Top 100 Games of All Time", commenting that "aside from single-handedly creating a new genre overnight, Bullfrog's Populous is a great marriage of war-game strategy, resource management, and pure originality."
