= Creatures 2 =

1998 video game

- Developer(s): Creature Labs
- Publisher(s): Mindscape
- Designer(s): Toby Simpson
- Composer(s): Peter Chilvers
- Series: Creatures
- Platform(s): Windows
- Release: NA: August 28, 1998; UK: September 1998
- Genre(s): Artificial life
- Mode(s): Single-player

Creatures 2 is the second game in the Creatures artificial life game series made by Creature Labs, and the sequel to the 1996 game Creatures. It features three species: the cute, dependent Norns, the cantankerous Grendels and the industrious Ettins. The game tries to simulate life, and includes a complex two-dimensional ecology of plants, animals and insects, which provide the environment for the three main species to live and develop in. The player interacts with the world using a hand-shaped cursor, and tries to encourage the creatures' development by manipulating various objects around the world, guiding the creatures using the cursor and encouraging the creatures to speak.

Many new gameplay features included in Creatures 2 not present in the original game include a new physics model and a global weather system, along with brand new applets and a world twice the size of the Creatures 1 world.

The executable file for the game was in fact an interpreter for its scripting language, thus allowing users to make total conversions or derivative works from the game.

== Gameplay ==
Like the other games in the series, Creatures 2 is mostly open-ended, with no predetermined goals, allowing the player to raise Norns at their own pace. In each new world, the player begins in the incubator cavern area. The hatchery, one of the game's in-built applets, allows the player to add Norn eggs to the world, which can be hatched via the incubator. Norns may also be downloaded from the internet and imported in to use in the game.

Once Norns reach adolescence at around an hour old, they are ready to breed, and female Norns will begin an oestrogen cycle. When Norns mate, there is a long kissing sound with a pop at the end – known as a kisspop. Like real life, not all mating results in a pregnancy. The Norn reproductive process can be monitored via the Breeder's Kit.

At the beginning, the player is only able to navigate a small area of Albia. As their Norns explore the world, however, more areas will be able to be visited. If a Norn falls into water and is picked up, it cannot be placed in an unvisited area.

Like the previous game, every plant, animal and insect in Albia is a separate system called an autonomous agent, or just "agent" for short. Many user-created agents have been made, which can be injected into the world using the Injector Kit applet, which also includes an analysis page giving the opportunity to check new objects for potentially harmful contents before injecting them.

Albia, the world in which Creatures 2 is set, is a vast disc-world filled with a wide variety of flora, ranging from the Cacti that inhabit the desert to the exclusive mushroom-like Gelsemium plant that can only be found in a single cavern. Albia is also home to a substantial amount of animal life, such as bees which pollinate flowers and create honey, and Zander fish, which provide a food source for creatures near the oceans. Scattered throughout the world are various seed launchers, which can be used to replenish stocks if any life-forms become extinct.

Albia also has four seasons: Spring, Summer, Winter and Autumn, and boasts its very own climate, with weather such as snow mainly occurring during the colder months, and rain mostly during the Spring. The game also has an on-screen thermometer, allowing the player to monitor Albia's temperature at all times.

== Development ==
Creatures 2's release was widely anticipated. It is likely that around 450,000 copies of the original Creatures had been sold by the time the game was released, and a huge following had developed behind it. The "Early Adoption Program", a promotion where 250 copies of Creatures 2 were given away prior to its official release in September 1998, was scheduled to begin in July 1998, but was pushed back as the game was not close to release quality at the point at which the EAP was scheduled to start. In the end, most received their copies several weeks after the release date.

The creatures themselves had been provided with "considerably more sensory input, more actions they can take, and improved brain dynamics". The game world included a "complete working eco-system".

Upon release, the game suffered from numerous flaws, such as a deficient Norn genome that lead to a condition dubbed "One-Hour Stupidity Syndrome (OHSS)", which caused Norns to forget basic survival skills such as eating and sleeping. The task of creating the new Norn genome was given to Sandra Linkletter (Slink), who was also a member of the Creatures community. During development, many problems emerged, most likely due to disagreements between Slink and the Creatures 2 team. Slink later claimed that her design had been compromised by the geneticist brought on to finish her work, Eric Goodwin, and later accused Cyberlife of deriving their update from hers.

Cyberlife later released a patch with an improved genome after several weeks had passed. Several users also created improved Norn genomes, such as the Canny Norn genome created by Chris Double and Lis Morris.

Two expansion packs, Life Kit 1 and Life Kit 2, were released for C2.

== Reception ==
200,000 copies of Creatures 2 were immediately shipped upon its release. Creatures 2 was considered "much more difficult" than C1, and the new, more challenging environment and Norn biology was described as frustrating, but that after installing a new genome and going through successive generations, the Norns seemed smarter. Nick Walkland described the gameplay as a "labour of love", noting that the challenge was to sustain your Norns' lives. Sid Fisk of Gamezilla criticized the audio for Creatures 2 for not alerting him when his creature was near-death, but playing a "funeral dirge" as the body left the screen.

== See also ==
- Creatures
- Creatures 3
- Docking Station
