= Populous: The Beginning =

1998 video game

- Developer: Bullfrog Productions
- Publisher: Electronic Arts
- Producer: Stuart Whyte
- Composer: Mark Knight
- Series: Populous
- Platforms: Microsoft Windows, PlayStation
- Release: Microsoft Windows: NA: November 17, 1998; PlayStation: NA: April 8, 1999; JP: June 10, 1999; EU: July 20, 2000
- Genre: Real-time strategy
- Modes: Single-player, multiplayer

Populous: The Beginning is a real-time strategy video game and the third entry in the Populous series, developed by Bullfrog Productions. The game was released in 1998 on Microsoft Windows, and in 1999 for the PlayStation. Unlike earlier games in the series, which cast the player in the role of a god influencing loyal followers, The Beginning took a radical departure and placed the player in the role of a shaman, who directly leads her tribe against opponents. Throughout the twenty-five missions of the campaign, the player leads their tribe across a solar system, dominating enemy tribes and tapping new sources of magic, with the ultimate goal of the shaman attaining godhood herself.

Populous: The Beginning was the first entry in the series to use 3D computer graphics; Bullfrog waited four years after Populous II: Trials of the Olympian Gods so that the graphics technology could catch up to their vision for a new and different game in the series. The developers considered the addition of terrain deformation and manipulation, combined with "smart" villagers who automatically attended to tasks, to add an entirely new dimension to the series. The game's original title was Populous: The Third Coming before being changed prior to the beta release.

Populous: The Beginning plays very differently from earlier titles and received mixed reviews. Critics noted the excellent graphics, while complaints were directed at the artificial intelligence and the indecision in game design between being a real time strategy title and a god game. GamePro's Peter Olafson wrote that Populous: The Beginning was a good game but was "without a quintessential quality that defined Populous."

== Gameplay ==
The game's three-dimensional graphics engine allows the player to zoom out to see the entire world.

Whereas previous Populous games were god games where players assumed the role of a god with terrain-altering abilities, Populous: The Beginning adopts elements of real-time strategy games. Rather than being a god, the player controls a Shaman trying to become one, and directly controls the actions of followers by ordering them to build structures or attack enemies. In the campaign mode, the player fights opposing tribes for dominion over the planetary system. Multiplayer with up to four players per game was offered via local area network, modem connections, or over the Internet through an external matchmaking service.

In the campaign, enemy tribes also have shamans, and on later levels all inhabit the same world. The objective in most missions is to eliminate enemy tribes with overwhelming force, though some missions have a different structure. The game has no formal resource management; new units are created automatically at houses, and training new troops costs nothing except mana. Only wood from trees is required to build new structures.

In comparison to the isometric presentation of the previous games in the series, Populous: The Beginning features three-dimensional (3D) graphics, with the game camera at a variable height and capable of rotating 360 degrees, enabling the player to quickly move across the planet's terrain. While the terrain's topology is a torus, the map is locally projected onto a sphere to give the illusion of a planet. On maps where there is no fog of war, players can see what opponents are doing at any time. Support for 3D acceleration enables the player to view the game in 16-bit or 32-bit colour. The landscape and real-time structure building and follower movement are also shown.

The player commands different types of followers, each of which has advantages and disadvantages in combat. The most basic unit is the Brave, which builds huts, towers, and military buildings. Braves are trained to become other units: tough melee Warriors; weak, long-range, Firewarriors; Preachers, who convert enemy units and prevent enemy preachers from converting friendly troops; and Spies, who perform espionage functions. Shamans are physically weaker than warriors, but can cast powerful spells and can be reincarnated if killed. These spells include tornadoes, storms, or volcanos that create new landmasses, and are slowly learned throughout the campaign. Some spells will disappear after use. Other spells can slowly be replenished for continued use; the rate of spell regeneration depends upon the player's number of followers. Examples of spells include "Landbridge", which raises the sea floor to create bridges across the sea; "Swarm", which sends a horde of insects to sow confusion in enemy ranks; and "Tornado", which creates a cyclone to destroy buildings. There are twenty-six spells in total; they can be used a limited number of times by worshipping at totems, or permanently learned by entering vaults with the player's shaman.

== Plot ==
Populous: The Beginning takes place before the first two games in the series in a planetary system of twenty-five unnamed planets. These worlds are inhabited by four human tribes, represented by their color: the green "Matak", the yellow "Chumara", and the red "Dakini". The fourth blue tribe, controlled by the player, is unnamed. Each of the tribes is generally hostile to one another, though alliances exist on some worlds. All the tribes are ruled by a single female shaman. In addition to the organized tribes are 'wildmen', neutral characters who cluster in groups around trees and water. Though they cannot attack or be attacked, players can use the Shaman's Convert spell to bring wildmen under her tribe's control.

The player's goal as Shaman is to become a deity; only by defeating all the enemies in the system can the player's shaman become omnipotent. The player begins on the planet furthest from the sun, and attacks each planet in sequence. Along the way, the Shaman learns new skills and magic to defeat her enemies. Victory requires the player to either destroy the opposition, or on occasion perform special actions. The player loses if the Shaman is killed and there are no remaining followers, if the Shaman is killed and there is no circle of reincarnation, or the player runs out of time on timed levels. Upon beating back the other tribes, the Shaman ascends to godhood and helps her people conquer the Matak, Chumara and Dakini in one final conflict.

== Development ==
Bullfrog Productions released Populous in 1989, followed by Populous II in 1991. The Populous series inspired the term "god game", with players assuming the role of an omniscient being who leads their people to new territories or into battle. Populous: The Beginning was published more than four years after Populous II, as Bullfrog waited for hardware advancements to enable a new approach, and was the first in the series to be made without Populous creator Peter Molyneux, who had sold Bullfrog to Electronic Arts (EA) in 1995 and left after the release of Dungeon Keeper to form Lionhead Studios.

Populous: The Beginning was the first in the series developed with entirely 3D graphics, allowing the environment to be scaled and rotated in real time, though characters remained 2D sprites. Producer Stuart Whyte said of the work, "We're really proud of what we've done in software because it does look really nice." Art lead Phil McLaughlin recalled that they wanted the characters to look primitive yet familiar, as opposed to something too fantastic; the final characters had to be constructed from very few polygons, so character concepts (done by Mark Pitcher) did not always satisfactorily translate to the finished product. Textures were assigned to different altitudes of the map and blended using masks, allowing for vibrant and varied landscapes without too much developer effort. The music was composed by Mark Knight, who had joined Bullfrog's team in 1997.

Bullfrog representative stressed the changes the game made distinguished Populous: The Beginning from other real-time strategy games on the market at the time. In some aspects, the developers were forced to remove features due to technical constraints; for example, the "Plague" spell from previous Populous titles was dropped because in practice the spell was too frustrating.

== Release ==
EA announced Populous at the 1998 Electronic Entertainment Expo, one of 16 titles for the publisher at the show. A number of strategy and god games being produced in 1998 and 1999, especially at EA, where Populous: The Beginning was expected to be one of its standout titles. Originally, the game was known as Populous: The Third Coming, but the name was changed by the time the game was shown in a fully playable beta form in late 1998. The game was released starting on November 17, 1998, on the PC. A PlayStation port followed.

Bullfrog released an expansion to Populous: The Beginning, Undiscovered Worlds in 1999. This add-on was only made available in the UK and US, and offered twelve new single-player and twelve multiplayer levels, with a continuation of the storyline begun in the previous game, where the player takes on the role of a new shaman.

== Reception ==
Populous: The Beginning

Aggregate score
Aggregator	Score
GameRankings	80%

Review scores
Publication	Score
AllGame	4.5/5
Computer and Video Games	4/5
Edge	8/10
GamePro	4.5/5
GameRevolution	B+
GameSpot	7.5/10
Hyper	88/100
IGN	8.6/10
Jeuxvideo.com	18/20
PC PowerPlay	86%
PC Zone	92/100
Video Games (DE)	75%

Populous: The Beginning received generally favorable reviews on release. Computer and Video Games called it one of the year's best titles.

IGN's Ward Trent was especially smitten with the immersive 3D graphics. Edge stated, "previous Bullfrog games have always placed gameplay above graphical finesse, but that's no longer the case." GameSpot's Ron Dulin appreciated how The Beginning was a daring revamp of the series, instead of a safe, slightly modified sequel (like the earlier Populous II: Trials of the Olympian Gods). Computer and Video Games rated The Beginning as a "better play" than the original.

Populous: The Beginning played very differently from earlier titles. Edge concluded that while the more rigid play format of The Beginning was new to the series, it had the effect of making the result "less show-stopping"; they believed that the game was caught between the god game and RTS genres, and did not excel at either. PCGamer subsequently decided the game failed to live up to the previous games in the series. The New York Times's J. C. Herz wrote that the twists Populous brought to the RTS formula, as the genre often felt stale and more focused on logistics. GamePro's Peter Olafson wrote that Populous was a good game, but also a different one "without a quintessential quality that defined Populous."

Complaints about the game centered on the difficulty of controlling followers, the simplicity of gameplay, and the tension between game styles. The game's AI allowed followers to automatically construct buildings, but this led to problems directing them in the midst of a hectic battle. IGN noted that with the player's followers automatically going about daily life, the replay value was lowered even with the multiplayer options. Others agreed that the automation rendered gameplay too simple, with no upgrades or serious resource management, a sentiment PC Gamer expressed when they wrote that the missions "become mind-numbingly repetitive".

The game won Best Strategy Game at the 1999 Milia D'Or Awards in Cannes.

Populous: The Beginning was among EA's best-selling computer games of the 1998 third fiscal quarter. It remains the final game in the franchise. Electronic Arts shut down Bullfrog in 2001. The official multiplayer servers for Populous: The Beginning went offline in 2004, but the game's multiplayer was kept alive through Populous: Reincarnated, managed by a group of dedicated fans.
