= Skull Caps =

- Developer: Creative Edge Software
- Publisher: Ubi Soft
- Platform: Microsoft Windows
- Release: EU: 1998
- Genres: Construction and management simulation, god game, real-time strategy
- Modes: Single-player, multiplayer

Skull Caps is a 1998 real-time strategy video game developed by Creative Edge Software and published by Ubi Soft for Microsoft Windows. It is a follow-up to Baldies (1995). In the game, the player manages a community of Skullies in order to build structures, increase their population, and create weapons to fight against enemies known as Hairies. There are four classes of Skullies and each structure has specific properties to assist the player. Its gameplay combines strategy with simulation and god game elements. Up to four players can participate in a multiplayer mode via local area network (LAN).

== Gameplay ==
Gameplay screenshot.

Player takes command of creatures named skullies that are pitted against hairies. There are 45 levels. Map of each level is made upon real landscapes. To proceed to the other level skullies have to destroy all hostile units and buildings. Gamers have options to play single player or LAN.

== Development and release ==
Skull Caps was developed by Creative Edge Software and published by Ubi Soft.

== Reception ==
Reception

Review scores
| Publication | Score |
|---|---|
| Génération 4 | 2/5 |
| Joystick | 84% |
| Micromanía | 65/100 |
| PC Games (DE) | 63% |
| PC Joker | 65% |
| PC Player | 62/100 |
| Power Play | 68.5% (Note: Average of two scores: 67% for single-player and 70% for multiplayer.) |
| Xtreme PC | 35% |

Skull Caps garnered mixed reception from critics. Génération 4's Sebastien Tasserie commended the "crazy" traps and animation of the Skullies, but saw the limited types of structures, average visuals, and cumbersome interface to be negative aspects of the game. Joystick's Céline Guise felt the game's humor and simplicity made it unique in the strategy genre. Guise noted its humorous animations and originality, but faulted the primary objectives. PC Joker's Steffen Schamberger highlighted its multiplayer, but found the graphical presentation rather simple and response of commands with the cursor occasionally sluggish. An editor for Micromanía wrote that the precision and speed of the cursor should have been more refined, while also commenting that each level can be repetitive. Regardless, they stated that the game was simple, entertaining and addictive.

Power Play's Stephan Freundorfer felt the game's basic idea was refreshingly different and found the traps occasionally hilarious. Freundorfer commended the multiplayer component, but faulted the game's visual design. PC Games' Petra Maueröder criticized the game's controls, graphics, and monotonous objectives. PC Player's Alex Brante gave the game positive remarks for its cute character animations, arsenal of weapons, and beginner-friendly tutorials. Nevertheless, Brante saw the lack of variety in the objectives and tactical options, and the confusing zoom feature as negative points. Xtreme PC's Maximiliano Peñalver praised the variery of stuff to develop, but ultimately lambasted its pre-rendered graphics, music, repetitive gameplay, and user interface, expressing that Skull Caps should have been released two years earlier.
