= Pocket Devil =

2009 video game

- Developer: Eyedip
- Publisher: Eyedip
- Platforms: iPod Touch, iPhone
- Release: October 14, 2009
- Genre: God game
- Mode: Single-player

Pocket Devil is a Pocket God clone for the iPhone and iPod Touch roughly taking 10 MB. It was developed, created and distributed by Eyedip LLC, a software company based on the East Coast. Lex Friedman, writing for Macworld, called Pocket Devil a "blatant rip-off" of Pocket God.

Built-in features of the iPod touch and iPhone OS 2.2.1 or later are used, such as the accelerometers to simulate gravity which can be used to drop the Mugat2's in a fiery gutter.

== Chapters ==
Pocket Devil is frequently updated with new 'chapters', a themed update that adds new features to the underworld, such as a new area, creatures, or minigames. They have released 20 chapters so far. It also has a sequel called Pocket Devil 2.

Episodes
Episode Number	Version Number	Release	Episode title	Features
1	1.0	10/12/09	Welcome to Hell	Welcome to Hell where you can hurt or save Mugat2's. This Chapter added a fish, a lava stream, a gas tank, a guillotine, and a stairway to heaven
2	2.0	11/13/09	It's Hot Down Here	They added Trizzy, the She-Devil, a pitchfork, a sewer, a rat, a new landscape, and a mini game to see how many Mugat2's you can hurt in 1 minute, also the rating went up to 17+.
3	3.0	12/8/09	Winter Underland	This update has two new games, a Xmas theme, Psycho Santa & sleigh event, icicle spikes, shake & fall, hang Mugat2 on Xmas tree, Mugat2 flick & fly, Game #1: Mugat2 Catapult Slingshot: "Save The Mugat2", Game #2: Mugat2 SlapFest," snowball fight, Trizzy's "Kiss of Death," Cave Demon makes a Mugat2 his meal, iced over guillotine, frozen staircase to Heaven, Trizzy is now fully functional, Trizzy has a new snow outfit, chain functionality upgrade, new theme song. and the game once again lowered back down to 12+
4	4.0	01/27/10	Silent but Deadly	Allows you to make Mugat2 to fart and when gas reaches a Mugat2, the Mugat2 smells it and gags. Also, a new minigame was added to the game, making a total of 3.
