= Populous DS =

2008 video game

- North American cover art
- Developer: Genki
- Publishers: JP: Electronic Arts; NA: Xseed Games; EU: Rising Star Games
- Series: Populous
- Platform: Nintendo DS
- Release: JP: February 21, 2008; NA: November 11, 2008; EU: February 27, 2009
- Genre: Real-time strategy
- Modes: Single-player, multiplayer

Populous DS (ポピュラス DS, Popyurasu DS) is a real-time strategy video game developed by Genki. It was published in Japan by Electronic Arts on February 21, 2008, in North America by Xseed Games on November 11, 2008, and in Europe by Rising Star Games on February 27, 2009, for the Nintendo DS.

== Plot ==
The player takes the role of a deity whose role is to lead their followers build a prosperous civilization in order to defeat an opposing deity and its worshippers. The player will be able to aid their followers through divine intervention, using abilities such as terraforming to manipulate the shape of the land of the map to make its civilization grow in numbers and strength.

== Gameplay ==
The main goal of the game is to help your civilization grow and prepare for the inevitable clash against the opposing worshippers in the final battle: the Armageddon. Every match has a certain duration that is indicated by a timer, which will automatically trigger the Armageddon once it runs out. During this time, the player will prepare their worshippers and help them become stronger by performing various miracles. Miracles are spells that require a certain amount of psychic energy to be cast: psychic energy is farmed through worshippers. The most basic of miracles, and the most important, is terraforming, which can be used to even the terrain to allow the worshippers to build more houses, which they will use to farm more energy for the player to use. Other miracles can either be used to aid the growth and stats of the population, or to hinder those of the enemy. The different playable characters have a set of different miracles with certain usages and effects that allow for different playstyles and strategies. The game offers various gamemodes, against CPUs, or other players though wireless connection, allowing to create matches with up to a max of 4 players.

There are a total of 10 maps where the battle between deities can take place, each with its own buffs and debuffs:

- Grass plain.
- Snowfield.
- Magma.
- Yamato.
- Fairytale.
- Persia.
- Horror.
- Outer space.
- Hanging gardens.
- 8-bit plain.

== Characters ==
None of the characters in the game have official names and are only referred to with their titles. There are 5 Gods and 5 Demons: all the deities can be unlocked by clearing levels of the game, while Demons are unavailable to the player as they can only be controlled by CPUs. The Gods and Demons of the same element share the same abilities and stats:

- Earth God and Earth Demon: they are able to control the power of the earth, using earthquakes and meteors to disrupt the terrain of the enemy and swamps to trap and kill enemy worshippers.
- Water God and Water Demon: they are able to control the power of water, using magical water to brainwash enemy worshippers in betraying their tribes.
- Fire God and Fire Demon: they are able to control the power of fire, using flames and lava to kill enemy worshippers and destroy the terrain.
- Wind God and Wind Demon: they are able to control the power of the winds, using tornados and typhoons to hinder the progress and lessen the vitality of the enemy worshippers.
- Harvest God and Harvest Demon: they are able to control the power of nature, using it to halt the production of psyche energy of the enemy worshippers.

== Reception ==
Reception

Aggregate score
Aggregator	Score
Metacritic	60/100 (20 reviews)

Populous DS received "mixed or average" reviews from critics, according to the review aggregation website Metacritic.
