= Creatures 3 =

1999 video game

- Developer: Creature Labs
- Publishers: Mindscape, Linux Game Publishing (Linux version)
- Series: Creatures
- Platforms: Linux, Windows, Macintosh
- Release: November 1, 1999
- Genre: Artificial life
- Mode: Single-player

Creatures 3 is the third game in the Creatures a-life game series made by Creature Labs. In this installment, the Shee have left Albia in a spaceship, the Shee Ark, to search for a more spherical world. The Ark was abandoned by the Shee because a meteor hit the ship, but the infrastructure still remains in working order.

There are six main "metarooms" on the ship; the Norn Terrarium, Grendel Jungle, Ettin Desert, Marine area, Bridge, and Engineering Room. The Norn Terrarium is where you can safely hatch and raise your norns. The Grendel Jungle is where the Grendel mother (egg-layer) is, and it is well suited for Grendels. The Ettin Desert is where the Ettin mother is; it is a dry, harsh environment for all creatures. The Bridge is where you will find the most gadgets, and also the most Ettins. The Engineering Room is where the Agent Creator is, with which players can create objects for the game world.

Grendels are now vicious, unlike the original Creatures Grendels; these Grendels enjoy hunting down, and then killing norns. The Ettins, which first appeared in Creatures 2, love gathering gadgets and taking them back to the Ettin Desert.

Creatures 3 runs on the CAOS engine, making it highly moddable, but now it is retired and outdated.

In December 2021, Creatures 3 was released on the Steam games service.
