= Populous II: Trials of the Olympian Gods =

1991 video game

- European cover art by David John Rowe
- Developers: Bullfrog Productions; PanelComp (Mega-Drive)
- Publishers: Electronic Arts; Virgin Games (Mega-Drive)
- Producer: Joss Ellis
- Designers: Peter Molyneux; Glenn Corpes
- Artists: Gary Carr; Paul McLaughlin
- Composer: Charles Callet
- Series: Populous
- Platforms: Amiga, Atari ST, FM Towns, MS-DOS, Classic Mac OS, Mega Drive, PC-98, X68000, Super NES
- Release: August 31, 1991
- Genre: God game
- Modes: Single-player, multiplayer

Populous II: Trials of the Olympian Gods is a strategy video game and the sequel to the 1990 game Populous. It was developed by Bullfrog Productions for the Amiga, Atari ST, and MS-DOS and published by Electronic Arts in 1991. A Mega Drive version, converted by PanelComp, was published as Two Tribes: Populous II in 1993 by Virgin Games.

Like its predecessor, Populous II is a god game, where the player is guiding their people in battle against the followers of an enemy god. Whereas Populous only generally alluded to undefined deities, Populous II is specifically set under the backdrop of Greek mythology. The player is a demigod, one of Zeus's countless children with mortal women, and has to battle one Greek deity at a time until finally facing his father. Zeus has promised to let the player into the Pantheon on Olympus if he can survive all the battles.

A data disk was released as Populous II: The Challenge Games. It was set in Japanese mythology instead of Greek.

== Gameplay ==
Populous II is considerably more versatile and has a great deal more "divine intervention" effects than the original game. Populous would only bestow eight powers on the player but the sequel, Populous II has twenty-nine (30 in the PC version). These are sub-divided into six categories of effect: earth, water, wind, fire, plants and people. The six categories are linked to a global "manna meter" which needs to be filled to a certain level to enable specific powers for usage. Manna is generated by population existing over time - the larger the population, the more manna is generated. Use of a power will deplete a set amount of manna and repeated use of the more devastating powers will empty the manna reservoir.

Similar to the "knight" effect in Populous, each effect category includes a "hero", allowing the player to transform his or her leader into one of six legendary figures in Greek mythology who will wander around the map attacking enemies or perform some other nefarious act.

If either side controlled a certain percentage of the map, usually 75%, ancient Greek monsters would be unleashed upon the map, such as the Colossus or Medusa, which would wander from one side to another leaving a trail of destruction in their wake. This was usually seen as a cue to hurry up and complete the map because the monsters were indestructible and were indiscriminate in who they killed.

Upon the successful completion of a map, the player will be awarded between one and five small experience points depending on scale of victory, number and types of powers used and length of battle which can then be used to boost capabilities in any of the six categories. This will improve accuracy and duration of powers and reduce the amount of manna needed to activate abilities.

The game features 1000 maps and the player would advance to the next map depending on performance in the battle - an exceptional performance would allow the player to skip several maps; a more unsatisfying performance would bring the player no farther than three or fewer maps.

One of the effects in the plants category is a deadly fungus that is planted on the ground, changing its shape and killing anyone who steps on it. Although the manual does not explain how it grows, it is easy to see that its shape-changing obeys the rules of Conway's Game of Life.

=== Populous II: The Challenge Games ===
The data disk introduced 500 new maps to conquer and one additional divine intervention. Beside a new Japan inspired graphics style there is also a new play mode with 42 levels (challenges), slightly resembling a puzzle game.

== Development ==
The Amiga version of Populous II began development in March 1991, and was released in November 1991. British gaming magazine The One interviewed Peter Molyneux, the designer of Populous II, for information regarding its development in a pre-release interview. Populous II was in the design stages before its predecessor Populous had finished playtesting, and The One states that "[the] game has effectively been developing for more than two years, although actual keyboard work only began in March." Populous II doesn't reuse code or assets from Populous, and Molyneux expresses that he holds the design philosophy that "You can't call anything a sequel unless it's totally rewritten, because otherwise it's really just a data disk - and we've already done enough of those." While the final product lacks assets from Populous, Populous II's development began with Populous being ported to a newer computer to be used as a framework. Due to the new city-building aspect present in Populous II, The One states that "there's a very strong possibility that you will be able to export these cities to SimCity and play around with them there", a feature absent in the final game.

Memory restrictions were a notable limitation in Populous II's development, and Molyneux expresses that as a result, 1MB Amigas have more animation than 1/2MB Amigas, and all sprites are compressed. Finding gameplay roles for two Greek gods in particular was noted as a difficulty; Aphrodite and Dionysus, due to determining what their spheres would translate to in-game. In response to criticisms of Populous regarding players being unable to recover when the opposition is winning, a feature wherein the player's followers create temples - even in enemy territory - was added, with the inclusion of this 'random' element intended to require players to change strategies as necessary. Populous II incorporates a total of 35 effects, as Molyneux expresses that "People were always saving [resources] for a volcano or earthquake". Greek and Celtic mythology, as well as the Bible, were used as references for Populous II's effects. Populous II's icon-based UI was changed due to the addition of new effects, and Molyneux states that "There just wasn't enough space on screen: at one point we had icons which were four pixels by eight wide - how do you distinguish a whirlpool from a whirlwind in that?" As a result, effects were split into five categories - earth, air, fire, water, and people, albeit Molyneux expresses his reluctance in doing so, stating that "That isn't my favorite option - because when you're playing a game, everything should be fully accessible all the time - but it was the best compromise we could come up with."

To maintain a user-friendly UI despite the amount of icons, The One states that "the team is optimising the distance between the icons so that the most used should be closest to the edge of the screen and it should take the smallest amount of time possible to move from item to item." Molyneux cites work on previous Bullfrog titles as learning experiences that contribute to design choices made in Populous II, stating that "Flood taught us how to draw quickly onto the screen ... Powermonger taught us about databases and design and Populous taught us how to program". The initial graphics for Populous II were created by Molyneux, but was then taken over by graphic artists Gary Carr and Paul McLoughlin. Populous II's backgrounds and sprites were created using DPaint 3 and a custom-built graphic editor created by Glenn Corpes - this custom editor allows the artists to test sprites in the game without the need to continually change the game's code. Populous II's music and sound effects were added late in development - initially Charles Callet, the composer for Powermonger was to do the soundtrack, but this was changed due to 'unreliability', and another factor in the delay was Molyneux's self-professed 'perfectionism'; he states that "We want the music and sound effects to be a really big part of the game. I think that, in general, game music is underplayed ... What we're going to try to do with the in-game music for Populous II is make it more informative, so as the action starts speeding up, the music starts changing tempo with it." At this stage in development, Populous II was stated to run at 17 frames per second, with Molyneux purporting that "a game that would have taken 20 minutes in the original would now take something like 20 seconds! We'll have to slow it down."

== Reception ==
Reception

Review scores
Publication	Score
The One for Amiga Games	96% (Amiga)
Mean Machines Sega	89% (Mega Drive)
MegaTech	89% (Mega Drive)
MegaZone	90% (Mega Drive)

Computer Gaming World in 1992 stated that "Populous II is an elaborate program that is instantly absorbing and addictive", and later named it one of the year's best strategy games. In a 1993 survey of pre 20th-century strategy games the magazine gave the game three-plus stars out of five. Super Gamer gave the SNES version an overall score of 82% writing: "An attractive update of the original with a much smoother control system. A huge challenge, although it's somewhat repetitive." In 1995, Total! ranked the game 85th on its Top 100 SNES Games stating: "A lot like Populous only with a '2' on the end. If you liked Populous then, yes, you'll love this.
