= Creatures (video game series) =

- Genre: Life simulation
- Developer: Creature Labs
- Publisher: Mindscape
- Creator: Steve Grand
- Platforms: Windows, Classic Mac OS, Linux, PlayStation, Game Boy Advance

Creatures is an artificial life video game series created in the mid-1990s by English computer scientist Steve Grand while working for the Cambridge video game developer Millennium Interactive.

The gameplay focuses on raising alien creatures known as Norns, teaching them to survive, helping them explore their world, defending them against other species, and breeding them. Words can be taught to the creatures by a learning computer (for verbs) or by repeating the name of the object while the creature looks at it. Once a creature understands language, the player can instruct their creature by typing in instructions, which the creature can choose to obey.

A complete life cycle is modeled for the creatures—childhood, adolescence, adulthood, and senescence, each with its own unique needs. The gameplay is designed to foster an emotional bond between the player and their creatures. Rather than taking a scripted approach, the games in the Creatures series were driven by detailed biological and neurological simulation and its unexpected results.

There have been six major Creatures releases from Creature Labs: between 1996 and 2001 there were three main games, the Docking Station add-on (generally referred to as a separate game) and two children's games, and there were three games created for console systems.

== Overview ==
The program was one of the first commercial titles to code artificial life organisms from the genetic level upwards using a sophisticated biochemistry and neural network brains, including simulated senses of sight, hearing and touch. This meant that the Norns and their DNA could develop and "evolve" in increasingly diverse ways, unpredicted by the makers. By breeding certain Norns with others, some traits could be passed on to following generations. The Norns turned out to behave similarly to living creatures. Norns respond to external stimuli, such as interaction with the player, and internal stimuli, such as changes in chemical concentrations or neural activities. Sight is simulated by having a group of neurons representing each type of object in the world. When an object belonging to this type is in front of the creature ('within eyesight'), the neuron becomes active and the creature can 'see' the object. The Norns possess simulated biological drives which give punishment when they are raised, and reward when they are lowered. The model for Norns' decision-making process is behaviorist and based on Norns learning how to reduce their drives. Dickinson and Balleine state that while this stimulus-response/reinforcement process makes the creatures seem like they are goal-directed, they are instead 'habit machines' responding in a learned fashion to particular stimuli.

Mutations in the genome can occur, allowing new characteristics to appear in the population and potentially be inherited by a future generation. Because the Norns have a lifespan of roughly 40 hours, users could observe the changes that occur over a large number of generations. Faulty genomes can also occur—for example, Norns which cannot see or hear, creatures which are either missing organs or have surplus organs, or immortal Norns due to a hyper-efficient digestion system. Creatures used the emergent approach seen in animats, but with the goal of more complex behaviours than locomotion. Grand describes the psychological model of the creatures as being inspired by rats. In 2000, Grand described the intelligence level of Norns as being like ants. Margaret Boden, in 2003, rejected Creatures as being a form of alien life as the simulated metabolism is concerned with controlling the Norn's behaviour, not on maintaining its 'physical' form. In 2011, Grand stated that while the Norns in Creatures could learn, generalise from past experiences to novel experiences, and react in an intelligent manner to stimuli, they could not think.

The genetics in Creatures are somewhat different from human genetics; they are haploid. There is no concept of dominant gene and recessive gene, much less recombination between loci. Nevertheless, the complexity of the simulated biochemistry meant that Norn behaviour was highly unpredictable.

Among the fans of Creatures were the Oxford zoologist Richard Dawkins, who called it a "quantum leap in the development of artificial life", and author Douglas Adams. Creatures inspired some players to take up careers in the sciences.

== History ==
Originally conceived as a desktop pet with a brain, Grand later incorporated inspiration from The Planiverse to pitch a "little computer ewoks" game, like the game Little Computer People. Grand wanted players to have a rapport with their creatures, feeling that he should make the creatures seem "genuinely alive" to the player, showing "the 'right' kind of behaviour' in a variety of circumstances. To create this kind of behaviour, Grand felt it was necessary to program the creatures by simulating the building blocks of nature in a bottom-up approach, allowing the complex behaviour to emerge, rather than using a rule-based system approach. Grand later wished to include references to English and Norse mythology, to try to make the world more internally consistent, but found that the team wanted to make the game into a conventional adventure game. He later decided to scale back on the mythology aspects of the game, focusing instead on the artificial life point—eventually presenting the game as an artificial pet hobby, which provided some of the impetus to include genetics in the creatures. Creatures was developed as a consumer product by Millennium, and was released by Mindscape in 1996. The program was instantly successful, and an online community of players soon formed, swapping Norns, creating new objects for Albia, sharing tips on how to play the game and anecdotes about unexpected evolutionary changes that they had seen, and even creating new breeds of Norn. At one point, the Creatures online community was the largest of its type.

In 1996, Creatures won an EMMA Award. Based on sales of 500,000 copies of Creatures from 1996 through to the second quarter of 1998, it was estimated that at that time, there was a possible global population of up to five million norns.

Development of Creatures 2 began in Q3 1997. In 1998, the video games division of Millennium was sold to Sony Entertainment while those working on alife and Creatures formed a new company called Cyberlife Technology. Along with continued work on the Creatures titles, the company did work for industry and the British Ministry of Defence, famously attempting to teach live organisms to fly virtual fighter jets. Creatures 2 was nominated in the Artificial Intelligence category of the Game Developers Conference's Spotlight Award.

In the late 1990s, Grand left Cyberlife to form Cyberlife Research and focus on the production of new alife technologies, including work on a robotic life form he called Lucy as well as writing books about his research. The remainder of the company was renamed Creature Labs, and focused on video game development.

Sequels to Creatures, including Creatures 2, Creatures 3 and the small-children's games Creatures Adventures and Creatures Playground, were released by Creature Labs in subsequent years. Creatures Adventures won an EMMA Award in 2000. Creatures Playground was exhibited at E3 and nominated for a BAFTA Award in 2000. The final major Creatures release, Docking Station, was made available for download from the company's web site in 2001.

Development was suspended on future Creatures games on March 20, 2003, when Creature Labs ceased operations, but development and trademark rights have since been purchased by Gameware Development, Ltd. Gameware has revived the Creatures Developer Network, the shop, the forums, the Docking Station server, and has released many before-purchasable tools and add-ons for free.

Gameware staff that previously worked on Creatures developed a convergent media game for the BBC called BAMZOOKi.

In 2004, the Creatures games have been re-released in combination packs under the names Creatures: The Albian Years (C1, C2), Creatures Exodus (C3, DS) and Creatures Village (CA, CP). The Albian Years, and Exodus include the separate games, whereas Village has merged Adventures and Playground into a single game. At this time, it was estimated that there were thousands of Creatures players.

Kutoka Interactive, a Canadian children's software company, has created releases of Creatures Exodus (Kutoka) and Creatures Village (Kutoka Kids) that are compatible with both Apple's Mac OS X and Windows XP. They were released on 30 September 2005, and can be purchased either directly from Kutoka or from other online stores.

In November 2009, GOG.com announced that they were offering Creatures: The Albian Years, Creatures Exodus and Creatures Village for sale on their site as digital downloads. In 2011, Creatures 3: Raised in Space, a PlayStation One game, was re-released on the PlayStation Plus service.

In 2011, Fishing Cactus announced they were developing Creatures 4, to be demonstrated at that year's Gamescom. A second demonstration was exhibited at Gamescom 2012. Creatures 4 is Fishing Cactus's most complex game to date. Creatures 4 appeared at the 2012 Paris Games Week. In May 2013, Fishing Cactus announced that they and BigBen were partnering with ProSiebenSat.1 Games as a distributor, and that the name of the game would be changed from Creatures 4 to Creatures Online. Another demo was shown at Gamescom 2013. Julien Hamaide, a developer of Creatures Online, presented about it at the Game/AI Conference 2014. In September 2015, Fishing Cactus halted the development of Creatures Online.

In 2016, Spil Games announced that they had bought the Creatures intellectual property from BigBen and were developing a free-to-play mobile game called Creatures Family to be released in 2017. In December 2021, Creatures 3, Docking Station, Creatures: The Albian Years and Creatures Village were released on the Steam games service.

== Games ==
There were six major Creatures releases from Creature Labs. In addition to the three principal games, the Docking Station add-on (generally referenced as a separate game) and two children's games were released.

=== Main series (1996–2001) ===
The original Creatures game, released in the United Kingdom and Australia in November 1996 and in North America in July 1997, took place on the fictional disc-shaped world Albia. While the "faces" of the disc were uninhabitable, the "rim" of Albia was home to a complicated environment much like Earth's. Here lay an abandoned system of laboratories left over by the Shee, an advanced race that had suddenly left the planet many years earlier in order to find a more stable world. In these laboratories and environments, the player was able to hatch new Norns from leftover eggs and re-inhabit the world of Albia. According to Millenium, every copy of Creatures contains a unique starting set of eggs, whose genomes are not replicated on any other copy of the game. An expansion pack, called "Life Kit #1" was released for purchase later.

Creatures 2 added 16-bit graphics and a larger world.

Creatures 2, released on September 30, 1998, took place many years after the first game, after a devastating natural disaster (or, as explained in later games, a devastating Shee disaster) had changed the landscape of Albia dramatically and opened up new areas of the world. New technology and species were made available to the player, and the creatures themselves had been provided with "considerably more sensory input, more actions they can take, and improved brain dynamics". Despite the great change in environment, including a "complete working eco-system", the focus of the game remained the same. Creatures 2 Deluxe (with Life Kit) soon followed. 200,000 copies of Creatures 2 were immediately shipped upon its release. Two expansion packs, Life Kit 1 and Life Kit 2, were released for C2. Creatures 2 was considered "much more difficult" than C1, and the new, more challenging environment and norn biology was described as frustrating, but that after installing a new genome and going through successive generations, the Norns seemed smarter. Nick Walkland described the gameplay as a "labour of love", noting that the challenge was to sustain your Norns' lives. Sid Fisk of Gamezilla criticized the audio for Creatures 2 for not alerting him when his creature was near-death, but playing a "funeral dirge" as the body left the screen.

Creatures 3, released on November 4, 1999, took a detour from the first two games. It took place on the spaceship that the Shee had used to flee Albia. The ship was divided into many carefully controlled environments (Norn Terrarium, Jungle Terrarium, Desert Terrarium, Marine Terrarium). Creatures 3 was much more technologically focused, including many agents which could be connected in various ways to perform tasks. Still, the goal was to experiment with the three principal species and create a living world out of an empty ship. Creatures 3 included a "new social element", by which norns could remember relationships they'd formed with other creatures.

The final major Creatures release was Docking Station, an Internet-based add-on to Creatures 3, released free of charge on the Creatures web site on March 27, 2001. It was intended as a way to sell Creatures 3 (the player could dock the worlds of the two games together, hence the name "Docking" Station) and extra packs of Norn breeds. Docking Station has an intermittent reminder screen that encourages users to buy Creatures 3.

Docking Station added the possibility of interaction between individual player worlds; Norns could 'travel' to other online worlds via a central server, players could chat to other online players, and it was possible to track Norns (and their offspring) that had been present in their worlds via the Docking Station website. While Docking Station was released late in the series' run, it changed gameplay (and the potential of the series) dramatically. One reviewer stated that it opened up a whole new world for her online. Another reviewer criticised the online portion of the game, as it requires the player to find online buddies. Docking Station also expanded considerably on the game mythos, including the introduction of an 'anti-Shee', the Banshee (a Grendel/Shee hybrid).

=== Spin-offs ===
==== Creatures Adventures ====
Released in 2000, and targeted at younger children (ages 6–9), Creatures Adventures dropped the complex interface of the main series in favour of brighter graphics and a more childlike atmosphere.

==== Creatures Playground ====
The second game in the younger children's series, Creatures Playground (released the same year), could be connected to Adventures to create an even bigger world to explore. It has a theme park for the creatures, including mini-games like whack-a-mole.

==== Console games ====
The Creatures concept was made into three different games for consoles: Creatures for the Game Boy Advance and Creatures and Creatures: Raised in Space for PlayStation. In the PlayStation games, the hand is replaced by a fairy named Scrubby. Because of the limited processing power of the early-day consoles, the AI had to be completely reprogrammed by the console development team around Volker Eloesser.

==== Online games ====
Prior to the cancellation of Creatures Family, Spil Games produced two free-to-play online creatures games, Creatures Alchemist, and Creatures: Color Craze. Unlike the main series, these games are not simulation games, but are instead puzzle games loosely based on the Creatures franchise.

=== Cancelled games ===
Creatures Project Loci was planned as a fully 3D, third-person Creatures game based on puzzle-solving and adventure, set on the fictional planet of Cruthiar. It was in development at the time of Creatures Labs' liquidation, but was canceled due to lack of funding. Loci would have been the first Creatures game for PS2, Xbox and GameCube.

Creatures Online was a planned sequel to the third Creatures game being developed by Fishing Cactus. The game was announced as Creatures 4 in Fishing Cactus's blog in May 2011. Creatures Online was to have 5 worlds, was to be completely in 3D instead of 2.5D pre-rendered graphics, and in-game currency was planned to buy Norns toys, food, etc. Creatures Online was designed to be a free-to-play game. A collector's edition box was also announced with a Norn figurine, the three original games for current PCs, and the money paid for the game being usable as in-game money for Norns. Creatures 4 entered an in-house alpha phase in March 2013. The internal systems of the creatures from C3/DS were retained and updated for the 3D environment. Norns' fur patterns were to be partially procedurally generated, with the goal of ensuring "that no two Norns look alike". Heterochromia iridum was introduced. The norns of Creatures Online were to have a new drive, tentatively called "altruism", which would have encouraged them to do things to benefit the norn colony, like tending to plants and fixing broken toys. "Creatures 4" was renamed "Creatures Online" in May 2013. Creatures Online, unlike earlier entries in the Creatures series, was to have a system of missions for the player to complete. Creatures Online was cancelled in November 2015 due to the loss of the license.

Creatures Family was in development by Spil Games, who acquired the Creatures license in 2016. It was intended as a successor to Creatures Online, with a target audience over 20 years old, but was quietly canceled for "technical reasons" sometime before August 2019.

=== Related games ===
Building on the canceled 3D game, Gameware developed the mobile game Creebies for Nokia. It was announced in 2007 originally to be an N-Gage 2.0 title but was not released until 2010.

== Later bundled releases ==
There have been various re-releases of the Creatures games. The later re-releases from Gameware improved Windows XP compatibility by allowing them to run easily under non-administrator accounts and without the use of the compatibility mode, but break compatibility with some third-party content without the use of a third-party patch.

Creatures Trilogy / Creatures Trilogy Gold Collection

This release of Creatures Trilogy included Creatures, Creatures 2, and Creatures 3, as well as the Life Kit addons for the earlier games. It was released before Docking Station, but the version of Creatures 3 included in this was identical to the original release (except that it was using the newest patch) and was therefore compatible with Docking Station.

Encore Software released a Creatures Trilogy containing Creatures, Creatures 2, and Creatures 3, under their Encare line. They also released a "gold" version titled Creatures Trilogy Gold Collection.

Creatures Internet Edition / Creatures Gold

The final major Creatures release was a re-release in 2001 by FastTrak Software Publishing as Creatures Internet Edition, a bundle of Creatures 3, Creatures 3 Update 2, Docking Station, and a number of environment extras and tools (many with multilingual variants). Linux Game Publishing released a Linux port of Creatures Internet Edition a few months later in December 2001.

The original Creatures Internet Edition was released again in 2002 by Focus Multimedia, without the physical manual, as Creatures Gold, but the disc contents were identical (and so the installer and PDF manual both referred to it as Creatures Internet Edition).

Creatures: The Albian Years

Creatures 1 and Creatures 2 on one disk, updated to run on Windows XP.

Creatures Exodus

Creatures 3 and Docking Station plus a selection of new Norn breeds on one disk, updated for improved Windows XP compatibility. Mac OS X and Windows & Mac dual-format, and free downloadable versions are also available.

Creatures Village

Creatures Adventures and Creatures Playground, merged and updated for improved Windows XP compatibility. Mac OS X and Windows & Mac dual-format versions are also available.

Creatures Triple Collection

Creatures Triple Pack, otherwise known as Creatures Collection: Triple, contains The Albian Years, Creatures Exodus and Creatures Village for Windows.

== Gameplay ==
Basic gameplay consists of hatching some creatures, usually norns, and guiding them to reach maturity and to breed more creatures, with the goal of a more intelligent future population. Words can be taught to creatures by a learning computer (for verbs) or by repeating the name of the object while the creature is looking at it. After a creature understands language, the player can instruct their creature by typing in instructions, which the creature may choose to obey—the player gets the impression that the norns can understand the player, but do not want to follow the player's commands. The player cannot force creatures to do anything. Addressing individual creatures by their names, and issuing specific commands, such as "Alice push toy", is recommended, as is following up with rewards if they obey: the player is represented by a disembodied hand in the world, and the hand can attempt to teach creatures by tickling them as a reward or punishing creatures by slapping them. (For Creatures Village, aimed at very young players, tickling is done by a feather wand, and punishment is represented by a squirt bottle.) Older norns can also teach concepts to younger norns. Norns may also express to the player how they are feeling. The language aspect was incorporated to promote a relationship between norns and players, allowing players to anthropomorphise their creatures. Players usually actively administer their worlds, adding in objects to help their creatures thrive. A complete life cycle is modelled for the creatures—childhood, adolescence, adulthood, and senescence, each with their own particular needs. Breeding is depicted in the game as "a delicate affair", and is shown in the game by "a long kissing sound followed by a pop". The gameplay is designed to foster an emotional bond between the player and their creatures. Death has real consequences—the individual norns do not return after they die. All creatures are bipedal, but there are some variant appearances that are genetically linked. Some alternate play styles include "wolfling runs", where the player may not intervene in their creatures' lives, or even norn torture. Trying to selectively breed or engineer certain traits into the population is also popular, for example, coloured creatures, norns with a better immune system, or a less-aggressive grendel.

=== Species ===
Norns

A Norn is an AIL (Artificial intelligent life) species, the development and survival of which constitute the main thematic elements of the program.

Norns are playful, all-trusting, naive creatures that love to explore. This is often the reason for their downfall, suffering, and death. They are more susceptible to disease in comparison to Ettins and Grendels, and in old age they may fall prey to a wasting disease that prevents them from absorbing certain nutrients.

Grand wished Norns to be endearing and for players to keep them as pets—that they should be independent and stubborn, like toddlers, that the design of the norn should be appealing to as many people as possible, and that the player should care about the norns. Reviewers have compared the Norns' visual design to the Mogwai of the Gremlins film series. The Shee originally created the Norns as a mixture of valet and pet. According to the Creatures Labs website, they spread across the galaxy through the Warp and evolved into various variations, including but not restricted to: Toxic Norn, Treehugger Norn and Magma Norns. The spread of Norns throughout the galaxy is related to the mysterious disappearance of the Shee from Albia (from the point of view of the Norns). It may also be a sign of how the Shee fared in their attempt to find a habitable planet.

In the games, the Norns have their own simulated biochemistry, haploid genetics, and neural network to serve as a brain. From Creatures 2 onwards, Norns also possess organs determined by their genetics; mutation and injury can render these defunct, with typically fatal consequences. Each of these has grown somewhat over the course of the series, allowing the creatures to become more complex and intelligent. Norns are omnivores and eat a variety of foods, including carrots, lemons, seeds, insects, fish, honey, and other things. The Norns that the player starts with require some degree of training and discipline from the player in order to make good decisions to maintain their health; however, later on they can evolve to be more independent and hardy, with better-developed instincts and a more robust biochemistry. The player can take advantage of this to breed certain colours or traits through artificial selection, and through many generations the changes can become quite pronounced.

Norns are very social animals, sometimes to the extent that they will prefer to play with other norns than to eat.

Shee

The statue of a Shee in Creatures 2. This is one of very few official in-game appearances of the Shee. (There are more hidden deeper in the game.)

The Shee are a race of absent-minded scientists. They are the original inhabitants of Albia, and the creators of the Norns, Ettins, and Grendels.

The Shee are all inventors, and make most of their inventions to save time on tasks that would have taken but a few minutes otherwise.

Most of their discoveries are made by accident, and as such, they sequenced their own DNA and eliminated all genetic defects, before discovering the wheel.

Millennia ago, the Shee had left the disk-shaped world of Albia, as they desired to live on a "more spherical world". They created the Shee Ark, took along some Norns, Ettins, and various animals and plants, and set out for their new home. The Shee Ark, like all Shee spacecraft, was itself a living creature grown from scratch, and used "Bioenergy" (the energy of living things, used to balance the game) to perform its various functions.

Early concepts of the Shee had them as merely a more advanced life form than the Norns, not their creators.

Ettins

Ettins are a species in Creatures 2 and Creatures 3.

Ettins were created by the Shee to help them on their experiments, especially when using machinery. They made them like machines so much, they tend to steal bits for themselves, often taking them to wherever they consider their home.

C2 Ettins behave rather differently; they tend to lead a sad and lonely life underground with no one but Pitz and the occasional Grendel for company. The backstory in the guides and manual, as well as the opening sequence, reveals that they once lived in the desert at the top of Albia and, true to their nature, built the pyramid that sits there. The actual use (if any) of the pyramid is unknown.

Ettins were introduced into the Creatures series in C2, having been revealed to the world after the volcanic eruption.

An early concept of the Ettins described them as insignificant "small, lizard-like creatures", who were often kept as pets by Norns.

The Ettins in Creatures 2 were infertile; however, in Creatures 3, there were two Ettins aboard the Shee Ark at most times (both female), and it was possible to get them to breed if two of them were placed in the Gene Splicer machine to create a male Ettin.

An in-depth exploration of the genetics and neurology of the Ettins in Creatures 2 revealed that they were constantly in pain, apparently by design. This discovery was met by fan uproar.

Grendels

Grendels are the green-skinned, red-eyed antagonists of the Norns, over which the player has little control, stealing food and injuring individual Norns. They also carry diseases harmful to Norns. The early concepts of their appearance described them as "resembling a huge, titanium spider".

In the unmodified Creatures 1 and 2, Grendels do not reproduce, being born infertile. Generally, only one Grendel is alive in the world of Albia at a time. In Creatures 3, two Grendels were alive aboard the Shee Ark at most times (both male), but it was possible to get them to breed and have offspring if both were placed in the Gene Splicer machine and used to create a female Grendel.

In all three games, Grendels are automatically produced by a "Mother" machine; in Creatures 3, however, it is possible to ensure that there are no Grendels in the game by killing any existing grendels (e.g. in the airlock) and then waiting by the mother, then placing any eggs into water (the piranha pool) so that they cannot hatch.

The Grendels were another genetically engineered creation of the Shee, albeit an accidental one. They were certainly not what the Shee were trying to get as a result from their experiments, and were considered to be harmful, useless monsters. However, some of the evil Shee (known as the Banshee) believed the Grendels were genetically superior to the Norns, and kept some for improvement.

It is possible to cross a Norn with a Grendel, creating a 'Grenorn'.

The Creatures community has appeared to adopt the Grendel as an underdog figure, creating a "Grendel Liberation Front"—despite being intended to add stress to Norns' lives, players began to tame their Grendels.

=== User interface ===
In each of the games, players interact with the world through the use of a graphical hand as the player's mouse in the main visual area of the game. In Creatures and Creatures 2, players can use applets in a toolbar, often called Kits, along the top of the game window, to access many functions, such as getting their first norn eggs, naming and photographing their norns, monitoring the health and general biochemistry of the norns and administering medicines, monitoring pregnancies, injecting objects into the world, and recording deceased norns. Creatures 2 introduced an Ecology Kit and Neuroscience Kit.

In Creatures 3 and Docking Station, players still use a hand as their mouse to interact with creatures and the world, but the main game area does not have toolbars like in Creatures and Creatures 2, but instead has areas along the sides of the screens with buttons that the user can press to move to different locations, view the current creatures in the world, manage an inventory of items, and change game settings.

Charlie Brooker regarded the level of detail shown in the monitoring kits as "terrifying", and it has been argued that the detailed monitoring kits highlight the artificiality of the norns. Peter Smith disliked the limitation of C1 that the player is "limited to seeing areas that you've tagged as favorite places or that are currently inhabited by Norns," and found it difficult to correctly reward and punish the creatures. Creatures 2 introduced an angel and devil glyph which appears next to the hand to show you whether you are about to reward or punish your creature. Jim Brumbaugh, in reviewing Creatures, disliked the amount of typing that was needed to communicate with the creatures, but found the menu system "highly user friendly." He noted also that there was only one way that the player could save, when the player exited the game. Eddie Walou praised the simplified user interface of Creatures 4, saying that earlier games felt like you had to have your BAC to understand. Kahn Lusth, writing for Canard PC, enjoyed the new interface of Creatures Online for communicating with creatures, where with a click of the mouse the player can choose suggestions to guide their creatures, describing it as more convenient than typing keywords. To improve the ergonomics on the iOS system, a 'rubber-band' system has been created for Creatures Online, where the player draws a line between the norn and an object. When the finger is lifted, the available instructions appear.

=== Environment ===
While the initial pitch was for a desktop pet that could interact with other Windows programs, for example, Windows Media Player, as the game developed, the need for a self-contained world became more apparent. The world was named "Albia", after Albion, and one of the goals of gameplay became to explore Albia. Grand thought that having the creatures inhabit a rich, "messy", world, and to be able to interact with it in many ways would help creatures' personalities to emerge. The backdrop for Creatures was created by taking photographs of a physical model of the world, part of which is now housed at The Centre for Computing History. Sarah Kember describes Albia as a "technological Eden".

The world is rendered in 2.5D, and the world can smoothly scroll to follow a creature. The world contains many different items, which creatures can interact with in a variety of ways. Objects are written using an object-oriented programming technique—each item has their own scripts which determine how they interact with creatures and with other objects. Objects are detected by a creature by being in its line of sight, which excites a neuron dedicated to that class of objects. All objects within the world are categorised, once a creature knows the name of one object, they will associate it with all other objects in that same grouping. The object-oriented approach means that the games are highly modifiable. Some of the items in the world are dangerous to norns.

In Creatures 2, the environment became more complex, with a "Complete working eco-system, including weather, seasons and a functioning food-chain. The plants seed and spread around the environment if conditions allow. The result of this is a very "real" feeling world that adapts around the player."

In Creatures 3 and Docking Station, the game was set on a spaceship. The environment became more segmented into areas called "metarooms", small biomes, each with their own ecosystem. Players could download and add new metarooms to their games.

== Reception ==
As of May 2026, the Creatures Community, also referred to as CC, is still active online. The CC hold a "Creatures Community Spirit Festival" abbreviated to CCSF every year, in order to celebrate the games and the community that has formed around them. The games were made to appeal to a wide audience, with players often ranging in age. The online community continues to archive and document the history and surrounding information of the game

Several reviews of the series emphasize that the player would need patience, and it was often recommended for players who were not parents.

The early games did not have specific goals, leading some reviewers to consider it a 'small scale genetic experiment' rather than a full game. One reviewer compared the game to a 'virtual fish tank', feeling that once the frustration of raising norns through their childhood was over and a breeding population had been established, the game had become boring.

Several reviewers compared Creatures favorably to Tamagotchi when the game first came out.

Between July and November 1997, over 100,000 copies of Creatures were sold in the American market. Windows Sources magazine gave the series a "Stellar Award".

Jay Schindler, a game reviewer, speculated if the game was meant to be entertainment or, instead, a simulation of parenthood. Schindler criticized the inability to scroll all the way around the world, as well as noted that raising a group of norns was much more difficult than raising a single norn, due to the fact that they could interact with each other with much greater ease than the player could interact with a norn.

Don Labriola, another game reviewer, wrote of Creatures that "no other program so successfully mirrors the joys and challenges of raising a child or pet."

In 2016, the Creatures series was featured by an academic study into science-themed video games as depicting an accurate model of evolution and natural selection, displaying three key features of the process.
