= Creatures (1996 video game) =

- Windows cover art
- Developers: Creature Labs; Elo Interactive (GBA)
- Publishers: Windows/Macintosh: EU: Warner Interactive Europe; NA: Mindscape; PlayStation/Game Boy Advance: EU: Swing! Entertainment; NA: Conspiracy Entertainment
- Designer: Toby Simpson
- Composer: Andrew Barnabas
- Series: Creatures
- Platforms: Windows, Macintosh, PlayStation, Game Boy Advance
- Release: Windows, Macintosh: EU: November 1996; NA: July 1997; PlayStation: EU: 2001; NA: 18 May 2002; Game Boy Advance: EU: 8 February 2002
- Genre: Artificial life
- Mode: Single-player

Creatures is an artificial life simulation packaged as a video game developed by British studio Creature Labs for Windows, and was ported to Macintosh, PlayStation, and Game Boy Advance. It is the first game in the Creatures series.

== Gameplay ==
Creatures is a game in which the player can hatch and raise anthropomorphic creatures known as Norns.

Notably, the environment was actually a physically constructed model, carefully photographed. This was to keep graphics costs low.

Creatures is an artificial life simulation where the user hatches small furry animals and teaches them how to behave, or leaves them to learn on their own. These "Norns" can talk, feed themselves, and protect themselves against vicious creatures called Grendels. It was the first popular application of machine learning in an interactive simulation. Neural networks are used by the creatures to learn what to do. The game is regarded as a breakthrough in artificial life research, which aims to model the behavior of creatures interacting with their environment.

According to Millennium, every copy of Creatures contains a unique starting set of eggs, whose genomes are not replicated on any other copy of the game. An expansion pack, called "Life Kit #1" was released for purchase later.

== Development ==
The game was in development for four years.

== Reception ==
Reception

Aggregate score
Aggregator	Score			
Aggregator	GBA	Macintosh	PC	PS
Metacritic	N/A	N/A	N/A	43/100

Review scores
Publication	Score			
Publication	GBA	Macintosh	PC	PS
Computer Games Strategy Plus	N/A	N/A	2.5/5	N/A
Computer Gaming World	N/A	N/A	4/5	N/A
EP Daily	N/A	N/A	9/10	N/A
Game Informer	N/A	N/A	8.25/10	N/A
GameRevolution	N/A	B	B	N/A
GameZone	N/A	N/A	N/A	8.5/10
IGN	N/A	N/A	N/A	2.6/10
Jeuxvideo.com	14/20	N/A	N/A	14/20
MacLife	N/A	"Blech!"	N/A	N/A
Next Generation	N/A	N/A	5/5	N/A

The PlayStation version received "unfavorable" reviews according to the review aggregation website Metacritic. However, Next Generation said that the PC version "offers one of the most obsessive and entertaining experiences anyone can have in front of the computer." The Electric Playground gave the same PC version universal acclaim, over a month before it was released Stateside.

The PC version sold 100,000 units by November 1997. At the time, John Moore of Mindscape explained that the company "expect[s] to sell more than 200,000 Creatures by the end of the year." Global sales of the game neared 400,000 units by February 1998.

== Legacy ==
The model built during development and photographed as the game's backdrop is held at The Centre for Computing History, where it is on permanent display.

Charlie Brooker, who reviewed the game for PC Zone, would in 2025 use Creatures as the inspiration for a fictional game called Thronglets that was featured in the Black Mirror episode "Plaything".
