= John J. McNiff =

American public historian, historical interpreter, and archaeologist

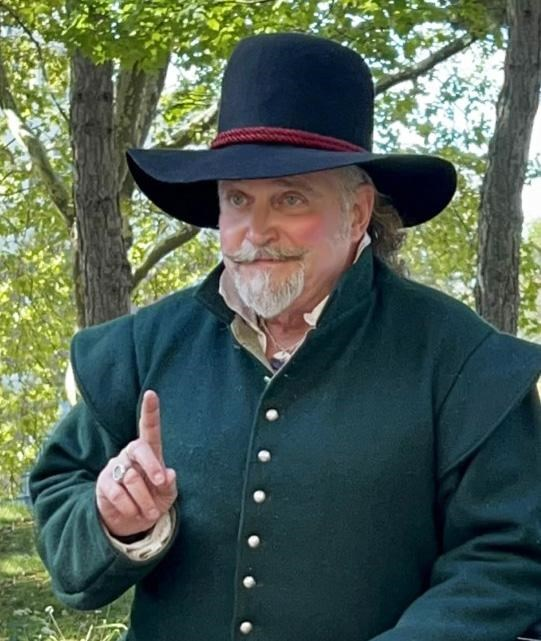
- McNiff portraying Roger Williams at the Roger Williams National Memorial, 2023 (NPS photo)
- Education: Rhode Island College (BA); Binghamton University (MA)
- Occupations: Public historian; historical interpreter; archaeologist
- Years active: 1974–present

John Joseph McNiff is an American public historian, historical interpreter, and archaeologist best known for his long-running first-person portrayal of Roger Williams at the Roger Williams National Memorial in Providence, Rhode Island. After a decade as an archaeologist, he served for 27 years with the National Park Service, where he helped develop the memorial's educational and interpretive programs and presented living-history programs throughout New England. He has also been active in historical reenactment, theater, and screen acting for decades, and continues to lecture, portray historical figures, and lead educational tours.

== Early life and education ==
McNiff was born and raised in Warwick, Rhode Island. He earned a B.A. in history with a minor in anthropology from Rhode Island College. He studied archaeology at Christ’s College, University of Cambridge and received an M.A. in anthropology from Binghamton University.

== Career ==
=== Archaeology ===
Before entering the National Park Service, McNiff spent a decade working as an archaeologist, balancing his fieldwork with employment in commercial fishing and advertising. During the 1980s and early 1990s, he worked with the Public Archaeology Lab in Pawtucket and Rhode Island College’s Public Archaeology Program, conducting investigations at historic and Indigenous sites across New England. In 1988, he participated in a National Science Foundation‑funded archaeological survey of the Altar River Valley in the Sonoran Desert of northwestern Mexico.

=== National Park Service and public history ===
McNiff joined the National Park Service (NPS) in 1996 and was assigned to the Roger Williams National Memorial the following year. Over the next 27 years, he served as the memorial’s content expert, developing educational programs, school outreach, public lectures, walking tours, and historical film programming. Public historian Sara Patton Zarrelli wrote that McNiff viewed the park as “a place for ideas,” aiming to ensure visitors reflected on Williams’s principles long after leaving the site.

McNiff is best known for his first‑person portrayal of Roger Williams, which he developed over nearly three decades at the memorial. His interpretation combines period clothing, material culture, and archaeological research to present Williams and his contemporaries as ordinary individuals rather than idealized historical figures.

McNiff retired from the NPS in 2023. Both before and after his retirement, he has led educational programming exploring sites associated with Roger Williams, including international trips to England, Wales, and Scotland, where he has served as a subject-matter expert. Since then, he has also lectured, portrayed historical figures, and guided tours, such as narrated Providence River boat tours. For Rhode Island's United States Semiquincentennial observances, McNiff delivered lectures and portrayed Williams at commemorative programs, including WaterFire Providence's Independence Day lighting in 2026. He also serves as a trustee of the Cocumscussoc Association, the nonprofit organization that operates Smith's Castle, a historic site in North Kingstown, Rhode Island.

=== Performance and acting ===
Parallel to his academic and professional career, McNiff has maintained a lifelong involvement in historical performance, reenactment, and regional theater. He began historical reenacting in 1974 with the Kentish Guards, an 18th‑century ceremonial militia based in East Greenwich, Rhode Island. Over the following decades, he interpreted a wide range of 17th‑ through 19th‑century figures from Rhode Island’s colonial and maritime history for local heritage groups.

His performance work also extended to theatrical and screen acting. For more than two decades, McNiff worked as an actor, director, and stage combat instructor at King Richard's Faire in Carver, Massachusetts. He performed with the professional Cumberland Company for the Performing Arts, serving as an associate producer and appearing in more than a dozen stage productions, including Robin Hood (1991) and Blackstone Borne (1992). McNiff’s screen credits include acting roles in local television and short films, as well as appearances as an extra in Steven Spielberg’s Amistad (1997) and the PBS documentary series We Shall Remain (2009).

== Selected honors ==
- 2001: Rhode Island College Alumni Honor Roll, for achievements in anthropology and public history.
- 2009: Honorary Lifetime Membership, Roger Williams Family Association, for service in public education and preserving Roger Williams's legacy.
- 2014: Public Humanities Scholar Award, Rhode Island Council for the Humanities, for outstanding teaching and scholarship in public humanities.

== See also ==
- Roger Williams
- Roger Williams National Memorial
- History of Rhode Island

== Sources ==
- "Author archive: Lori Melucci". Blackstone Valley Historical Society. May 10, 2025.
- Borg, Linda (July 4, 2017). "Naturalization ceremony held at Roger Williams National Memorial". The Providence Journal.
- "Public Meeting: "Roger Williams Revisited"" (PDF). The Gazette. East Providence Historical Society. October 2019.
- "Speakers – 250th Celebration of the Meeting House". First Baptist Church in America. 2025.
- Gale, William K. (June 1, 1991). "Rich action, poor script: Cumberland Co.'s 'Robin Hood' misses the big target". The Providence Journal.
- Gale, William K. (May 1992). "'Blackstone Borne': A palatable history lesson". The Providence Journal.
- GoProvidence (2026). "Founding Waters: A Tour with Roger Williams". GoProvidence.
- Howard, Richard (August 1989). "Digging into Rhode Island's Past". The Providence Journal.
- "The Chronicles of Hope Man (2016)". IMDb. IMDb.com, Inc. 2016.
- "Macy's Goes to War (2019)". IMDb. IMDb.com, Inc. 2019.
- Janusonis, Michael (July 26, 1997). "Local swashbuckler takes a stab at fulfilling his on-screen fantasy". The Providence Journal.
- Mand, Frank (August 30, 2010). "A taste of the apprenticeship program at King Richard's Faire". Wicked Local. GateHouse Media.
- Mingis, Ken (June 5, 1998). "Expanded 'WaterFire' debuts tonight". The Providence Journal.
- Moorehead, Jacquelyn (2024-07-03). "Historical actor McNiff portrays Roger Williams at Scituate Preservation Society". The Valley Breeze & Observer.
- Morgan, Thomas (May 29, 2011). "Roger Williams: A Founder's Legacy". The Providence Journal.
- "Roger Williams National Memorial Foundation Document" (PDF). National Park Service. 2017.
- "We Shall Remain – Cast and Crew". American Experience. WGBH / PBS. 2009.
- Patton, Sara E. (2017). Springing Forth Anew: Progress, Preservation, and Park-Building at Roger Williams National Memorial (Thesis). University of Massachusetts Amherst.
- "New England Before the Europeans". Portsmouth Historical Society. 2012.
- "South County Happenings". The Providence Journal. February 19, 2008. p. D3.
- "2001 Alumni Award Honor Roll Recipients" (PDF). Rhode Island College. 2001.
- "RI Council for the Humanities Honors Community Leaders and Innovators" (PDF). Rhode Island Council for the Humanities. June 26, 2014.
- "RIGS Annual Meeting Program". Rhode Island Genealogical Society. 2026.
- "Virtual: "Roger Williams, New and Dangerous"". Rhode Island Historical Society. 2021.
- "Talk with Retired Park Ranger John McNiff on the Early Life of Roger Williams". Rhode Island Historical Society. January 30, 2024.
- "VIRTUAL: Special Presentation for British Landscapes Tour with Collette Travel". Rhode Island Historical Society. February 13, 2024.
- Fitzpatrick, Edward (March 7, 2017). "Students to Retrace Roger Williams' Footsteps in England". The Week at Roger. Roger Williams University.
- "Bulletin No. 96" (PDF). Bulletin of the Roger Williams Family Association. Roger Williams Family Association. 2009–2010.
- Russo, Amy (April 3, 2022). "Roger and Me: Going straight to the source to learn about RI — a one-on-one with founder Roger Williams". The Providence Journal. p. A23.
- "Our Board". Smith's Castle. Cocumscussoc Association. 2026.
- "Roger Williams in England at the Peace Dale Museum of Art and Culture". Sowams Heritage Area. 2019.
- "Saturday, July 4, 2026 – Commemorating 250 Years of American Independence". WaterFire Providence. 2026.
- "Waitlist Only: Roger Williams and His World — Talk with Dr. Charlotte Carrington-Farmer and John McNiff". Rhode Island Historical Society. January 28, 2025.
- "Little shop of horrors". The Providence Journal Evening Bulletin. October 26, 1992.
- Commencement Exercises: Baccalaureate Program (PDF). Rhode Island College. May 26, 1979.
