= Indiana Humanities =

Nonprofit organization based in Indianapolis, Indiana, U.S.

- Formation: September 1972
- Headquarters: 1500 N Delaware St., Indianapolis, Indiana
- President and CEO: Keira Amstutz
- Website: https://indianahumanities.org/

Indiana Humanities is a nonprofit organization based in Indianapolis that funds and produces public humanities programming throughout the state of Indiana. It is one of 56 humanities councils in the United States and is affiliated with the National Endowment for the Humanities.

== History ==
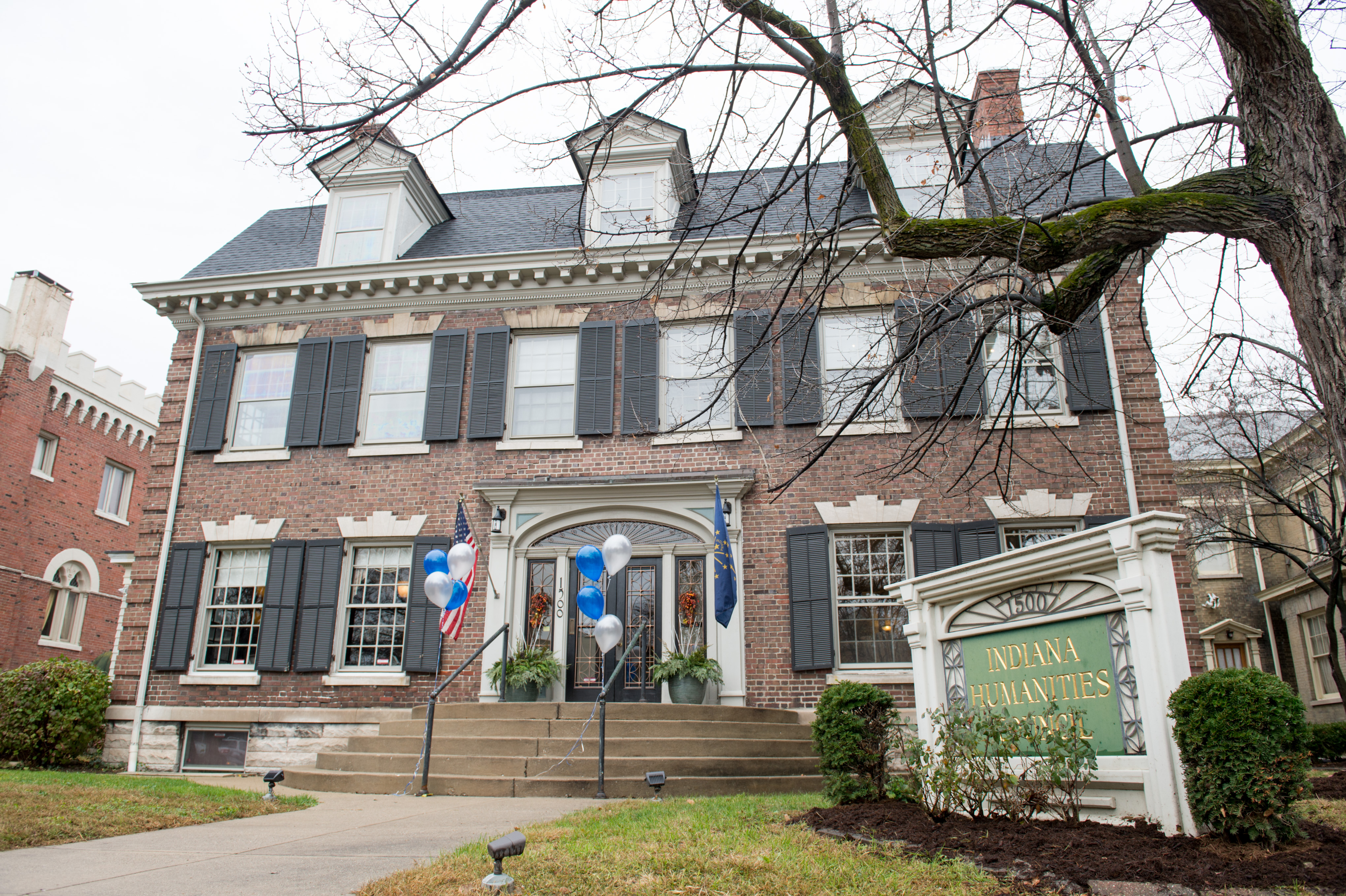
Meredith Nicholson House in Indianapolis, home to Indiana Humanities since 1986

The first iteration of Indiana Humanities was established in 1972 when the National Endowment for the Humanities encouraged the formation of the Indiana Committee for the Humanities, a statewide grantmaking organization made up of five Hoosiers. Since its inception Indiana Humanities has been a part of many special projects around the state, including leading a task force in 1991 that resulted in the establishment of the International School of Indiana.

Indiana Humanities has been headquartered in the historic Georgian Revival home of Indiana author Meredith Nicholson and civic leader Eugenie Nicholson since 1986.

== Current Activities ==
=== Grants ===
- Humanities Initiative Grant: provides nonprofit organizations in Indiana with funds to support humanities programs for public audiences.
- Historic Preservation Education Grant: given in partnership with Indiana Landmarks to fund educational projects related to historic properties in Indiana.

=== Programs ===
- Next Indiana Campfires: a series of statewide programming that blends nature walks, literature and discussion with the help of local humanities scholars and naturalists. This program won the Schwartz Prize for best humanities program in 2017.
- Novel Conversations: a free statewide lending library that loans more than 600 titles to reading groups across Indiana.
- Historic Bar Crawl: an annual bar crawl presented in partnership with Indiana Historical Society in its sixth year that reenacts notable scenes in Indianapolis history at surprising locations. Past themes have included the 1970s and the Cold War.
- INconversation: a speaker program that brings thought leaders from around the country to Indiana for small group discussions.
- Indiana Authors Awards: a biannual book award celebrating Indiana literature. First established in 2009, The Eugene and Marilyn Glick Indiana Authors Awards are given to the best books by Indiana authors written in eight different categories and published during the previous two years.
- One State/One Story: a series of statewide read programming that focuses on a chosen book. Examples include Frankenstein, The Year We Left Home by Jean Thompson, World of Wonders by Aimee Nezhukumatathil, All That She Carried: The Journey of Ashley’s Sack, a Black Family Keepsake by Tiya Miles, and Freedom Over Me by Ashley Bryan.

=== Thematic initiatives ===
In 2017–2018, Indiana Humanities deployed a seriecs of programming exploring the relationship between STEM disciplines and the humanities called Quantum Leap. This initiative included a slate of statewide programming around the classic novel Frankenstein, for which Indiana Humanities was given a $300,000 grant from the National Endowment for the Humanities.

From 2021 to 2025, the Unearthed initiative included programming exploring humans' relationship to the natural world. Programs included two film series, a speakers bureau, the How to Survive the Future podcast, Campfires, hosting the Smithsonian Museum on Main Street Water/Ways exhibit, several One State/One Story statewide reads, and several scholarly conversation series.

Other past thematic initiatives include Food for Thought, Spirit of Competition, Next Indiana, and INseparable.
