= List of state humanities councils in the United States =

List of private, non-profit partners of the National Endowment for the Humanities

State humanities councils in the United States are private, non-profit partners of the National Endowment for the Humanities (NEH). There are 56 councils located in every U.S. state and jurisdiction. These councils work to support local public humanities programs as well as to extend the NEH's national programming to local communities. All state humanities councils receive federal funding through the National Endowment for the Humanities; beyond this, the councils are diversely funded through private donations, foundations, corporations, and/or state funding.

== History ==
The NEH was initially skeptical of the creation of local programming entities on the model of the National Endowment for the Arts (NEA), which, by 1969, had created state-based arts agencies in every state. However, under pressure from Congress and especially Sen. Claiborne Pell, the NEH began to experiment with the creation of non-governmental state-based committees in 1971. The initial mission of these committees was to facilitate conversation about public policy. Responding to further pressure from Congress to transform the committees into state agencies, as the NEA had done, the NEH instead began working to increase the committees' autonomy. By 1980, the committees' programming agendas had been greatly broadened and the NEH had begun to refer to them as "state humanities councils." The Federation of State Humanities Councils was founded in 1977 as a membership organization for the state councils.

== List of state humanities councils ==
State/Jurisdiction	Humanities Council
Alabama	Alabama Humanities Foundation
Alaska	Alaska Humanities Forum
American Samoa	Amerika Samoa Humanities Council
Arizona	Arizona Humanities Council
Arkansas	Arkansas Humanities Council
California	California Humanities
Colorado	Colorado Humanities
Connecticut	Connecticut Humanities
Delaware	Delaware Humanities Forum
District of Columbia	Humanities DC
Florida	Florida Humanities Council
Georgia	Georgia Humanities Council
Guam	Guam Humanities Council
Hawaii	Hawaii Council for the Humanities
Idaho	Idaho Humanities Council
Illinois	Illinois Humanities Council
Indiana	Indiana Humanities
Iowa	Humanities Iowa
Kansas	Kansas Humanities Council
Kentucky	Kentucky Humanities Council
Louisiana	Louisiana Endowment for the Humanities
Maine	Maine Humanities Council
Maryland	Maryland Humanities
Massachusetts	Mass Humanities
Michigan	Michigan Humanities Council
Minnesota	Minnesota Humanities Center
Mississippi	Mississippi Humanities Council
Missouri	Missouri Humanities Council
Montana	Humanities Montana
Nebraska	Humanities Nebraska
Nevada	Nevada Humanities
New Hampshire	New Hampshire Humanities Council
New Jersey	New Jersey Council for the Humanities
New Mexico	New Mexico Humanities Council
New York	Humanities New York
North Carolina	North Carolina Humanities Council
North Dakota	North Dakota Humanities Council
Northern Marianas Islands	Northern Marianas Humanities Council
Ohio	Ohio Humanities Council
Oklahoma	Oklahoma Humanities Council
Oregon	Oregon Humanities
Pennsylvania	Pennsylvania Humanities Council
Puerto Rico	Fundación Puertorriqueña de las Humanidades
Rhode Island	Rhode Island Council for the Humanities
South Carolina	The Humanities Council of South Carolina
South Dakota	South Dakota Humanities Council
Tennessee	Humanities Tennessee
Texas	Humanities Texas
Utah	Utah Humanities Council
Vermont	Vermont Humanities Council
Virgin Islands	Virgin Islands Humanities Council
Virginia	Virginia Foundation for the Humanities
Washington	Humanities Washington
West Virginia	West Virginia Humanities Council
Wisconsin	Wisconsin Humanities Council
Wyoming	Wyoming Humanities Council
