= Missouri Humanities Council =

The Missouri Humanities Council, also known as Missouri Humanities (MH), is a 501(c)(3), non-profit organization that was created in 1971 under authorizing legislation from the U.S. Congress to serve as one of the 56 state and territorial humanities councils that are affiliated with the National Endowment for the Humanities (NEH).

MH supports and provides programs that encourage family reading and support local museums, libraries, and other organizations promoting humanities education—facilitating public conversations on topics that include history, religion, archaeology, anthropology, philosophy, literature, law, ethics, and languages.

== History and Structure ==
In 1971, the National Endowment for the Humanities (NEH) contacted academic leaders in various states and asked them to form state committees to create a new form of adult education experience centered in humanities scholarship and related to public issues. The state committees were set up as grant-makers, similar to the NEH, and The Missouri Committee for the Humanities was among those first groups formed in 1971. Robert Walrond, a specialist in continuing education at St. Louis University, was among the group that founded the Missouri Committee, and he served as its executive director until 1986.

In 1976, Rhode Island Senator Claiborne Pell led the revision of the federal statute that authorized the NEH to operate, naming the state councils as legitimate entities entitled to a portion of the NEH budget. This fundamental change led the state councils to formalize their incorporation in each state as tax-exempt, non-profit corporations, retaining their status as grantees of NEH.

The Missouri Humanities Council was formally incorporated as a non-profit organization in 1975 and received IRS 501(c)(3) status in April 1977. The office is currently located in St. Louis, Missouri. The board members of council, which include individuals nominated and elected by the council and members appointed by the governor of Missouri, are located across the state and come from diverse backgrounds including education, business, agriculture, museums and libraries, and law. The MH bylaws currently call for the council to include no fewer than 24 and no more than 30 total board members, of whom up to six may be gubernatorial appointees. The board members of MH hold three meetings per year at which the conduct business including review and voting on major grant applications.

== Mission ==
MH is committed to "building a thoughtful, engaged and civil society" by providing and supporting programs and projects which promote humanities education, encourage family reading, and assist Missouri museums, libraries, and community organizations in offering humanities-based activities.

To accomplish its goals, the organization has always worked to "create bridges" between humanities scholars and general public audiences. In recent years, MH staff and board members also have come to place considerable emphasis on responding to what constituent and partner communities and organizations see as their needs and priorities, rather than from the "top down." Another equally important guiding principle is collaboration: in an era of diminishing resources, MH works to extend its impact and relevance by engaging as much as possible with partners in its initiatives and programs. Recent partners have included the Mark Twain Boyhood Home and Museum, the Missouri History Museum, the Missouri Association of Museums and Archives, and the State Historical Society of Missouri.

== Ongoing Programs and Partnerships ==
MH offers a variety of programs. These include competitive grants to support humanities-related projects and programs around the state of Missouri, family reading initiatives, heritage tourism projects, and traveling exhibits. The council also collaborates in promoting and providing other public humanities programming. Ongoing programs include:

=== Traveling Exhibits ===
In collaboration with the Missouri History Museum, MH sends traveling exhibits to Missouri communities on subjects such as Missouri in the Civil War and helps develop programs and exhibits for the host communities to tell their own stories in the context of the larger statewide narrative.

=== Project and Program Grants ===
MH awards competitive grants to Missouri institutions, organizations, and communities to help them develop and present high-quality, humanities-based programs, events, exhibits, and publications. Missouri Humanities’ Mini Grants fund projects up to $2,500. Applications are considered two times each year with the following deadlines: MAY 1 & NOVEMBER 1. Missouri Humanities’ Major Grants fund projects up to $10,000. Applications are considered two times each year with the following deadlines: FEBRUARY 1 & AUGUST 1.

=== Missouri Speakers Bureau Services ===
In collaboration with the State Historical Society of Missouri, MH maintains a network of experts and scholars to provide affordable, high-quality programs and presentations for organizations and institutions around the state.

=== Veterans' Creative Writing Initiative ===
MH partners with organizations across the state to provide veterans and their families with an outlet for self-expression through writing. Our Veterans Programs offer support to new and experienced writers through workshops, readings, podcasts, and an annual publication, Proud to Be: Writing by American Warriors. Together, these programs encourage hundreds of veterans to tell their stories each year.

In collaboration with various partners, MH helps provide creative writing workshops for veterans. Other successful components of this program include an annual writing contest and the production of an anthology, "Proud to Be," which is published in partnership with Warriors Arts Alliance and Southeast Missouri State University Press.

=== Signature Series ===
Each year, the Missouri Humanities Council (MH) presents a Signature Series focusing on a humanities theme relevant to the state’s history, culture, or society. Events, workshops, presentations, and other activities related to the theme are organized across the state throughout the calendar year.

=== Small Town Showcase ===
Each year, communities will be nominated and voted on by Missourians to become our annual “Featured Five” communities. Each of our Featured Five will work with Missouri Humanities on the following:

- A short video about their community
- An hour-long podcast, roundtable-style
- A feature in our bi-annual publication, MoHumanities
- A highlight reel, featuring all five communities, to be shown during our annual gala

=== Cultural Heritage Workshops ===
MH Cultural Heritage Workshops provide the tools and resources necessary for communities to re-evaluate their cultural heritage assets in an effort to begin or revive programming, tourism, and economic development opportunities in their area.

=== Library of Congress Center for the Book ===
The Missouri Center for the Book is a program of Missouri Humanities and the state affiliate of the Library of Congress Center for the Book. MH's mission is to commemorate and promote appreciation for and greater awareness of Missouri’s rich literary heritage. This includes hosting an annual regional Book Festival and selecting two books to represent the state at the National Book Festival in Washington D.C. every year. These titles are added to the Great Reads from Great Places book list. The list features books and authors representing the literary heritage of all 50 states and U.S. territories.

Since receiving Affiliate Center status in 2021, MH's work is guided by input from numerous literary and literacy-based organizations, authors, and educators from across the state of Missouri who serve on the Missouri Center for the Book (MOCFTB) Planning Team.

=== Literature Programs ===
MH's Literature Programs commemorate and promote appreciation for Missouri’s rich literary heritage. By creating programs that bring greater awareness to local literature, MH is encouraging reading for pleasure and expanding literary education for Missourians of all ages.

== Funding ==
Current funding sources for MHC include:

- The National Endowment for the Humanities
- The state of Missouri, through the Missouri Arts Council/Department of Economic Development (as spending authority from the humanities trust fund administered by the Treasurer of the State of Missouri, which was built up with monies allocated by the General Assembly from the "Out-of-state Athletes and Entertainers" income tax)
- Donations from individuals, including the MHC council members and staff
- Corporate, foundation and institutional grants and sponsorships; recent sources include:
  - Target Corporation
  - Walmart
  - Custom Type
  - The Saigh Foundation
  - The Woman's City Club of Kansas City
  - Commerce Bank
  - Edward Jones Investments
  - Barnes & Noble—Jefferson City
  - Missouri American Water
  - Major foundation support for the MHC family reading initiatives provided by an anonymous donor

The future of public funding for the humanities is uncertain at present. Consequently, MH has launched a serious effort to diversify its sources of funding and build relationships with potential corporate and foundation partners.
