= National Humanities Alliance =

American nonprofit advocacy coalition for the humanities

- Abbreviation: NHA
- Formation: 1981
- Type: 501(c)(4)
- Tax ID no.: 52-1395619
- Headquarters: Washington, D.C.
- Executive Director: Stephen Kidd
- Website: nhalliance.org

The National Humanities Alliance (NHA) is a United States nonprofit coalition that advocates for federal support for the humanities and coordinates national research and public engagement initiatives. Founded in 1981, it brings together colleges, universities, scholarly societies, museums, libraries, cultural organizations, and state humanities councils. Alongside its advocacy work, the Alliance and its supporting foundation conduct research on humanities education and public humanities programs, document the impact of humanities organizations, and convene annual meetings and training sessions for scholars, students, and advocates.

== Mission and structure ==
The NHA was founded in 1981 by humanities organizations responding to the Reagan administration’s proposal to eliminate the National Endowment for the Humanities (NEH). It has continued to advocate for humanities funding through subsequent federal funding cycles.

NHA is structured as a 501(c)(4) nonprofit, which — unlike a 501(c)(3) — is permitted to engage in political campaign activity so long as it does not become the organization's primary activity. Its supporting arm, the National Humanities Alliance Foundation, is organized as a 501(c)(3) and conducts research used to inform policy discussions.

NHA’s role became especially visible during the 2025–2026 federal funding crisis, when the Department of Government Efficiency (DOGE) rescinded hundreds of previously awarded NEH grants. Civic and scholarly societies in the humanities encouraged their members to contact Congress through NHA’s advocacy tools and report terminated grants to NHA.

The NHA has been described as the only national organization that advocates for the broad-based humanities community as a whole.

== Initiatives ==
In addition to direct lobbying, NHA maintains several national research initiatives that support its policy work:

- Humanities for All — a project documenting more than 2,000 publicly engaged humanities initiatives across all 50 states, the District of Columbia, and Puerto Rico.
- NEH for All — a catalog of the local and national impact of NEH-funded programs, providing state-by-state profiles used in congressional advocacy.
- Study the Humanities — a research initiative providing data on humanities career pathways and undergraduate enrollment trends, and supporting broader research on public humanities infrastructure and the community impact of humanities organizations. In 2026, NHA presented preliminary findings from a new effort to document the humanities workforce as part of this initiative.

Scholarly commentary has identified NHA as an influential actor in national debates over the future of humanities education. Writing in Public Humanities in 2024, Jonathan Bate argued that humanities disciplines face a long-term enrollment decline and pointed to NHA's Study the Humanities initiative as an example of efforts to show how reconfigured humanities curricula prepare students for varied career paths.

== Humanities Advocacy Day ==
NHA organizes an annual Humanities Advocacy Day, during which advocates form state-based groups to visit congressional offices and advocate for federal humanities funding. Its annual meeting includes concurrent training sessions on topics such as the NEH, Title VI and the Fulbright-Hays Program, the National Archives and Records Administration (NARA), humanities–STEM collaborations, and applied humanities curricula. The meeting also includes sessions for students pursuing humanities-related careers in policy and advocacy, as well as professional development opportunities for faculty, administrators, and scholarly societies.

== Finances ==
In fiscal year 2024, the National Humanities Alliance reported $859,317 in revenue and $855,210 in expenses, ending the year with $445,891 in net assets. Program service revenue accounted for 99% of total revenue, while 70% of total expenses were directed to program services.

== See also ==
- National Endowment for the Humanities
- Humanities

== Sources ==
- "About". National Humanities Alliance.
- "Our History". National Humanities Alliance.
- "Services". National Humanities Alliance.
- "About Humanities for All". National Humanities Alliance Foundation.
- "OU faculty advocate for humanities funding in annual visit to the Capitol". OU Daily. 2026.
- "National Humanities Alliance (NHA)". American Political Science Association.
- "National Humanities Alliance: DOGE Rescinds NEH Grants". American Historical Association. 2025.
- Christina H. Paxson (2013). "The Economic Case for Saving the Humanities". The New Republic.
- Jonathan Bate (2024). "Teaching the Humanities for the Future Public". Public Humanities. 1. Cambridge University Press. doi:10.1017/pub.2024.6.
- "Kidd to Lead National Humanities Alliance". American Educational Research Association. 2012.
- "Form 990: National Humanities Alliance". philanthropy.org. 2024.
- "National Humanities Alliance (501(c)(4))". ProPublica. 2024.
- "2026 Annual Meeting Program" (PDF). National Humanities Alliance. 2026.
- "Humanities Policy Priorities FY 2027" (PDF). National Humanities Alliance. 2026.
- "ACLS, AHA, and MLA File Motion for Summary Judgment to Restore Previous NEH Function and Funding". American Council of Learned Societies. 2026.
- Raymond Chick; Amy Henchey. "Political Organizations and IRC 501(c)(4)" (PDF). Internal Revenue Service.
