= Humanities Nebraska =

Non-profit organization to foster public humanities programs in Nebraska

Humanities Nebraska (HN) is a non-profit affiliate of the National Endowment for the Humanities (NEH) based in Lincoln, Nebraska. HN creates and supports public humanities programs with the goal of engaging the public with history and culture.

== History and Structure ==
Humanities Nebraska was established as an NEH state-based affiliate in 1973. The organization, formerly known as the Nebraska Humanities Council, adopted its current name in 2013.

HN consists of the Nebraska Humanities Council, which conducts programs and awards grants, and the Nebraska Foundation for the Humanities, which secures and advocates for public and private funding for the council. Both the Council and the Foundation are overseen by a volunteer board of directors.

== Programs ==
=== Chautauqua ===
HN's Chautauqua is a revival Chautauqua established in 1984 and hosted annually by rural communities throughout Nebraska. The week-long program is centered on a series of first-person portrayals of historical figures, and also includes workshops and other activities. Past figures portrayed at Chautauqua have included Mark Twain, Willa Cather, and Standing Bear.

=== Governor's Lecture in the Humanities ===
The Governor's Lecture in the Humanities is an annual free, public lecture established in 1996 by HN and Nebraska Governor Ben Nelson. The inaugural lecture was delivered by speechwriter Ted Sorensen.

==== Sower Award ====
The Sower Award in the Humanities is presented annually at the Governor's Lecture to an individual, institution, business, or community that has made a significant contribution to public understanding of the humanities in Nebraska. Past Sower Award winners have included poet Ted Kooser, Nebraska Educational Telecommunications, and the community of Seward, NE.

=== Capitol Forum on America's Future ===
Capitol Forum is a collaboration between HN and the Office of the Nebraska Secretary of State designed to encourage Nebraska high school students and teachers to discuss international issues such as trade and terrorism. The program is centered on a day-long annual event in March, during which students visit the State Capitol in Lincoln to meet with Nebraska elected officials. The Capitol Forum curriculum is developed by the Choices for the 21st Century Education Program at Brown University.

=== Prime Time Family Reading Time ===
Prime Time Family Reading Time is a family reading and discussion program offered for free in communities where elementary student reading scores do not meet state standards. The program was developed by the Louisiana Endowment for the Humanities in 1991 and was first offered in Nebraska in 2002. HN's Prime Time program won a Public Humanities Programming Award in 2011.

=== Museum on Main Street ===
Museum on Main Street is a partnership between HN and the Smithsonian Institution Traveling Exhibition Service that brings traveling exhibitions to Nebraska cities and towns. HN also works with community organizations to develop events and programs related to the museum exhibitions, which explore United States history and culture.

=== Partnerships ===
HN collaborates with the Nebraska Library Commission and the Nebraska Arts Council to facilitate the work of the Nebraska State Poet. The organization also offers grants in support of various public humanities projects.

== Funding ==
Humanities Nebraska is funded primarily by the National Endowment for the Humanities. The organization is also supported by a public-private partnership between the Nebraska Cultural Endowment and the State of Nebraska, established by the Nebraska Legislature in 1998 to ensure a stable source of funding for arts and humanities programs in the state. The endowment, which matches income from a state fund against private donations, was the first state cultural endowment of its kind.
