= Mississippi Humanities Council =

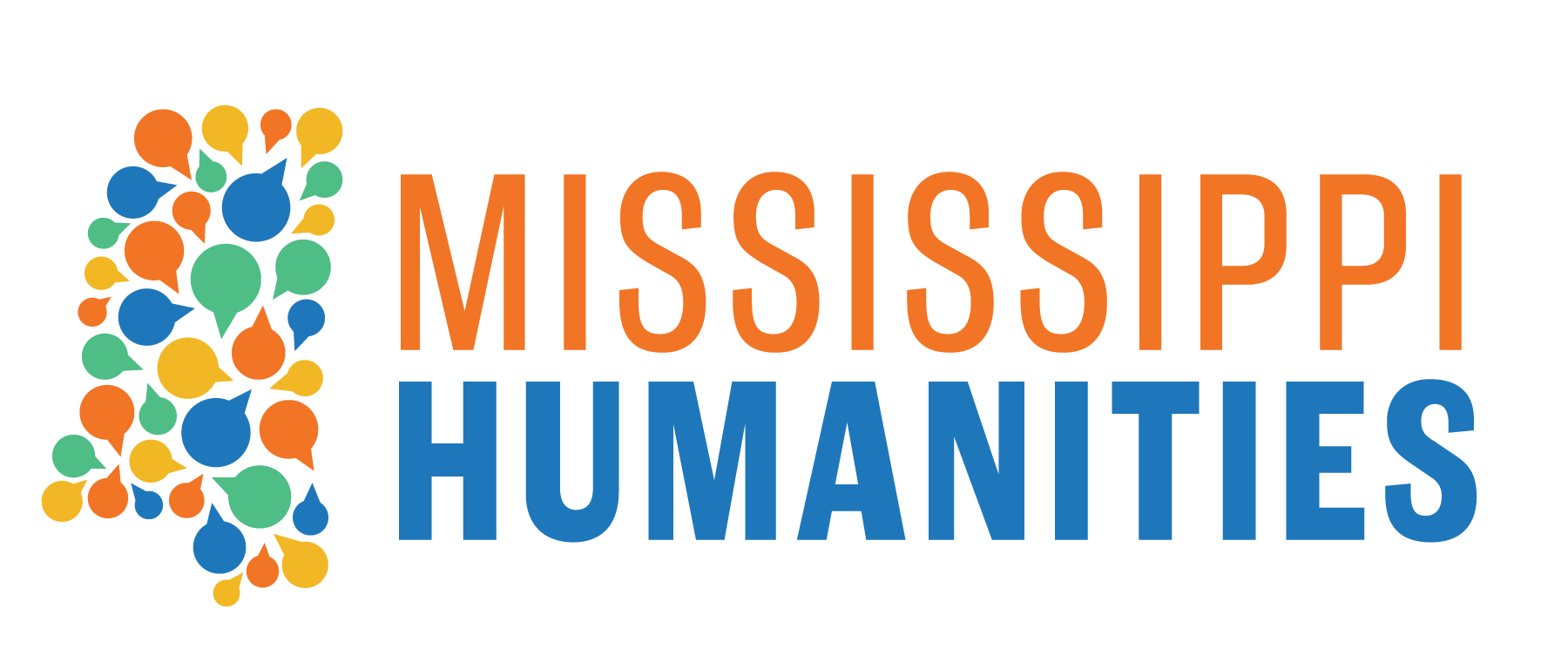
- Type: Not-for-profit
- Registration no.: 64-0561264
- Headquarters: Jackson, MS
- Official language: English
- Executive Director: Dr. Stuart Rockoff
- Assistant Director: Mrs. Carol Andersen
- Budget: $907,761 (2013)
- Website: Mississippi Humanities Council

The Mississippi Humanities Council is a private not-for-profit corporation funded by the United States Congress and the National Endowment for the Humanities. Its mission is "to provide public programs in traditional liberal arts disciplines to serve nonprofit groups in Mississippi." The Mississippi Humanities Council belongs to a group of 55 other such state and territorial humanities councils that receive Federal support. The MHC was founded in 1972.

The Mississippi Humanities Council sponsors a number of programs annually. These include awards recognizing post-secondary educators in the humanities. Other "public humanities" awards recognize citizens who advance the study and understanding of humanities among the citizens of Mississippi.

The MHC also supports adult and family literacy programs.

== Sources ==
- Mississippi Humanities Council website
