= Roger Williams Family Association =

Lineage society for descendants of Roger Williams, founded in 1906

- Official seal of the association, adopted in 1932
- Abbreviation: RWFA
- Named after: Roger Williams
- Formation: January 30, 1906
- Founder: Frederick C. Sayles
- Type: Family association
- Headquarters: Rhode Island
- Fields: Genealogy, history preservation
- Members: approx. 1,100 (2026)
- Website: www.rogerwilliams.org
- Formerly called: Roger Williams Association

The Roger Williams Family Association (RWFA) is an organization of lineal descendants of Roger Williams, the 17th-century founder of Providence, Rhode Island. Founded in 1906 and based in Rhode Island, it preserves genealogical records, publishes the Annual Bulletin, and organizes reunions and public programs related to Williams's legacy.

== Formation ==
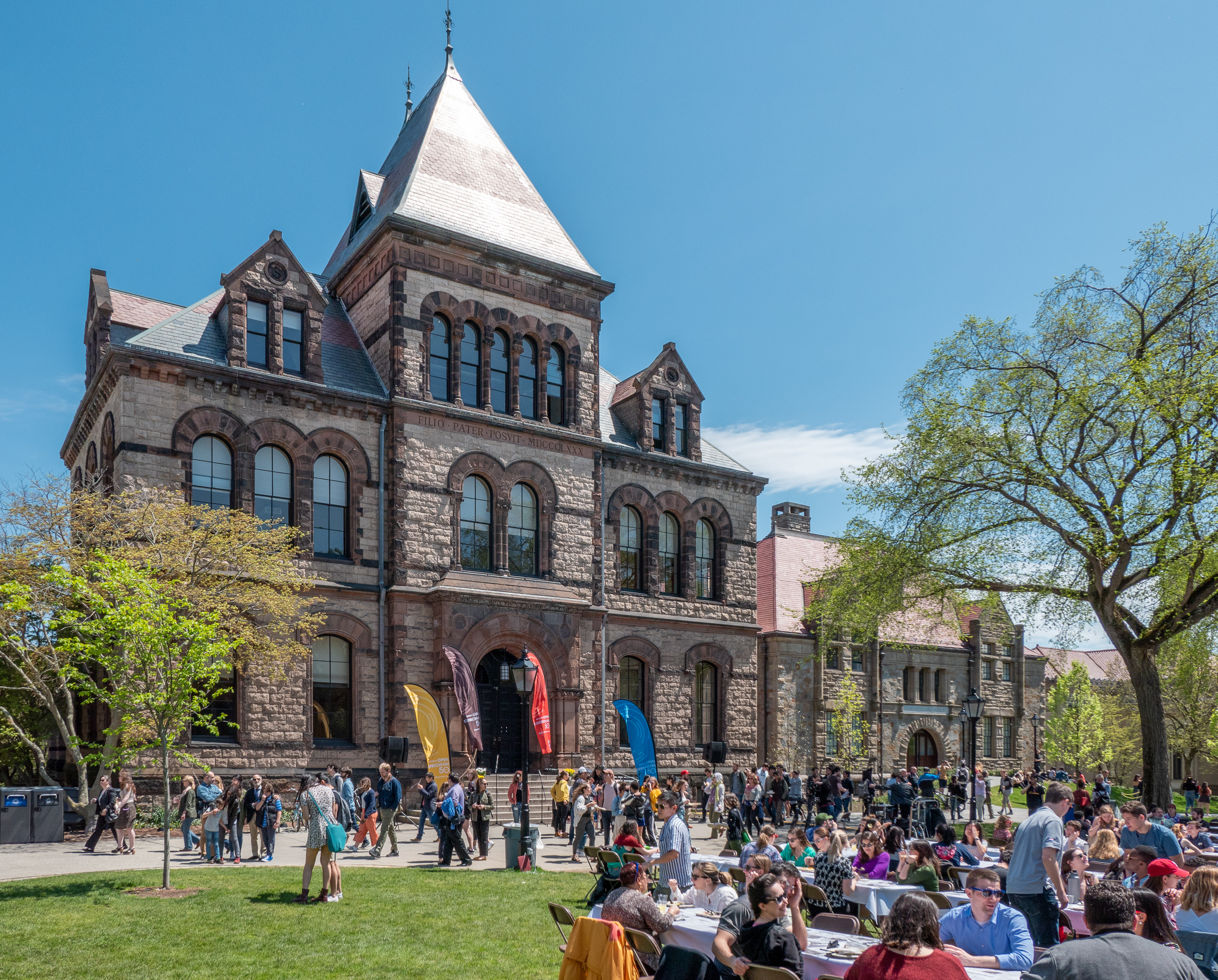
Sayles Memorial Hall, Brown University

The association traces its beginnings to the early 1880s, when several Williams-descended families held annual reunions at Roger Williams Park in Providence. In 1886, during Providence's 250th-anniversary celebrations, Pawtucket mayor Frederick C. Sayles called for a gathering of descendants at Sayles Hall, Brown University. Expected attendance was 50–60; instead, roughly 1,000 people arrived, some carrying genealogical charts and others relying on family tradition. This gathering led directly to the formation of the Roger Williams Association (the group's original name).

== Early years ==
The Roger Williams Family Association was formally incorporated in Providence on 30 January 1906, when an agreement of was filed with the Secretary of State of Rhode Island. The certificate lists fourteen charter members. (Note: Louis E. Remington, Amasa L. Eaton, William J. Bowditch, John Spencer Williams, Sarah L. C. Swett, Sheldon Williams, O. C. Sherman, Charles Dean Kimball, Hattie E. Hall, Sarah M. Hicks, Sarah E. Dyer, Lucy A. H. Allen, and Hope A. K. Lassone.)

The founding charter states that the association was formed:

1. to honor and preserve the memory of Roger Williams;
2. to prepare and preserve an authentic genealogy of his descendants;
3. to identify as many descendants as possible; and
4. to promote friendship and social intercourse among them.

The RWFA adopted its official seal in 1932, based on a signet ring used by Roger Williams. The seal features six stars representing Williams's six children and a shield with a lion rampant surrounded by nine pheons.

The RWFA began publishing its Annual Bulletin in 1942, a tradition that continues today.

== Membership and governance ==
As of 2026, the RWFA reports a membership of approximately 1,100 descendants.

Governance is defined by bylaws most recently revised on April 18, 1998. Membership is open to lineal descendants of Roger Williams, as certified by the Registrar, while spouses may join as associate members with voting rights. The offices of President and Vice Presidents are reserved for lineal descendants, and an honorary presidency is maintained for the oldest known living descendant. Annual reunions take place on the third Saturday of June at Roger Williams Park.

== Selected community activities ==
In addition to its regular meetings, tours, and historical lectures, the RWFA has collaborated with civic, academic, and cultural institutions on projects that promote Rhode Island history.

=== Prospect Terrace Park statue dedication (1939) ===
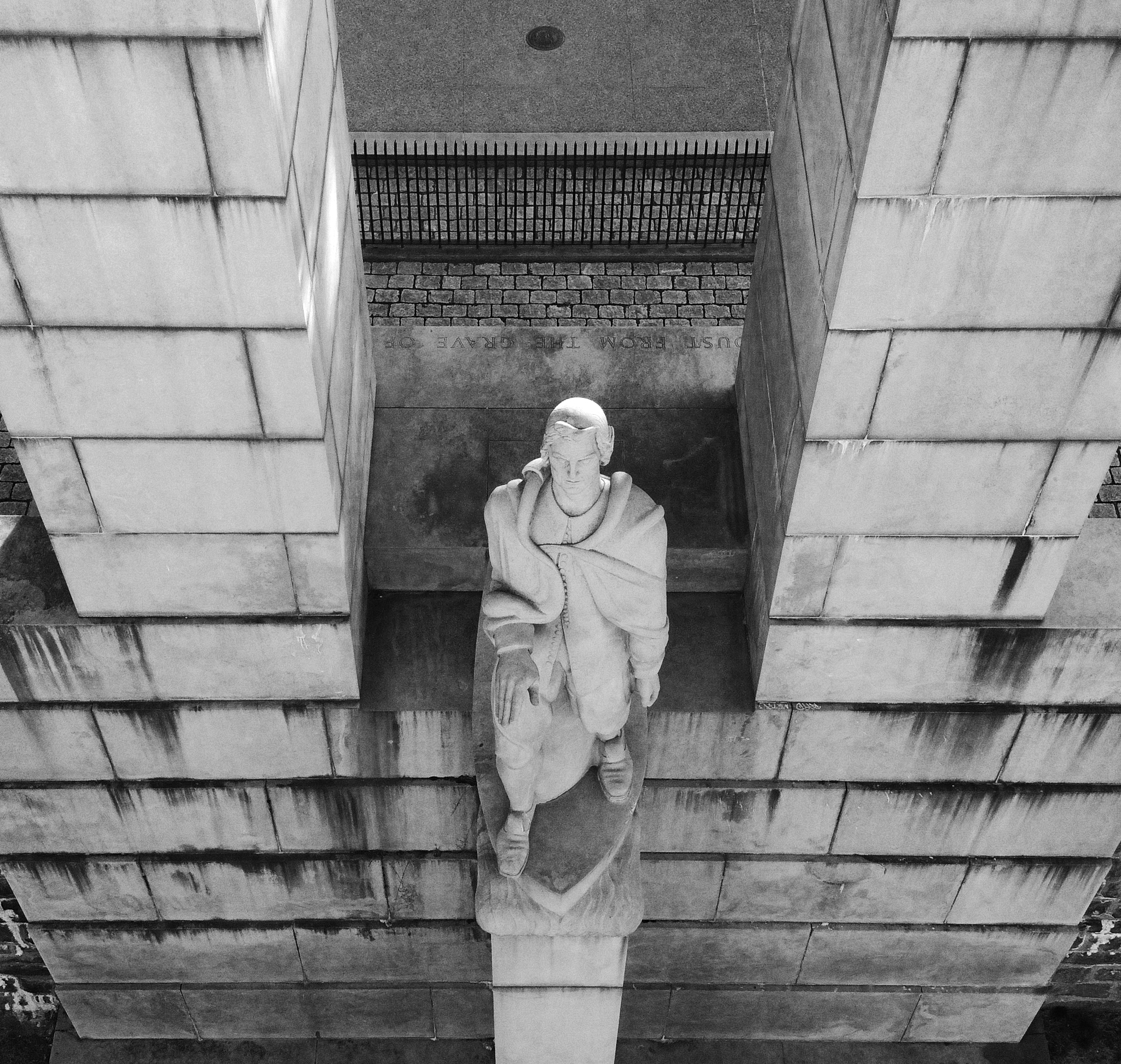
Roger Williams statue, Prospect Terrace Park

In June 1939, RWFA officers participated in the dedication of the Roger Williams statue at Prospect Terrace Park in Providence. The statue was unveiled by Hilda Schuster (née Williams), then president of the association, and the ceremony included the placement of Williams’s remains within the monument.

=== Commissioning of the State House portrait of Roger Williams (1983–1984) ===
In 1983–1984, RWFA members collaborated with Rhode Island historian Virginia Doris to commission a formal portrait of Roger Williams for permanent display in the Rhode Island State House. Artist Robert Evans Breck completed the portrait in 1984, addressing the long‑noted absence of Williams among the state’s official portraits.

=== Participation in the Rhode Island 350th anniversary kickoff (1984) ===
On June 3, 1984, RWFA president Stephen A. Greene Jr. represented the association at the opening ceremonies launching Rhode Island’s observance of its upcoming 350th anniversary, held at the Roger Williams National Memorial. Greene took part in the parade and program alongside reenactors portraying Roger Williams and Anne Hutchinson, members of the Narragansett Nation, and other civic groups.

=== Dedication of the Roger Williams National Memorial (1984) ===
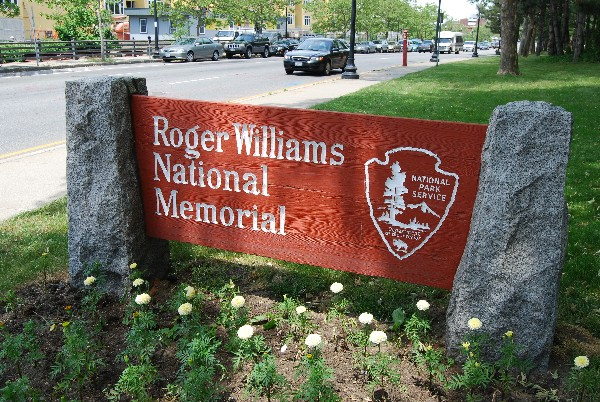
Roger Williams National Memorial signage

RWFA members attended the October 8, 1984 dedication of the Roger Williams National Memorial, Rhode Island’s first unit of the National Park System. The ceremony, led by U.S. Senator Claiborne Pell, marked the completion of federal efforts to preserve the site of Williams’s original Providence spring.

=== Restoration of the 1638 Narragansett deed (1984–1986) ===
The RWFA funded the professional conservation of the 1638 Providence deed granted to Roger Williams by Narragansett sachems Canonicus and Miantonomi, a project announced during the statewide 350th‑anniversary kickoff in 1984. The restored deed was publicly exhibited at City Hall in June 1986 as part of Providence’s “A City’s Treasures” display with RWFA members attending the opening reception.

=== Sayles–Greene tombstone restoration (1994–1996) ===
From 1994 to 1996, the RWFA led a major conservation project at Easton Cemetery in Middletown, restoring the damaged tombstones of Roger Williams's daughter, Mary (Williams) Sayles, her husband John Sayles, and their son‑in‑law William Greene. The association funded professional stone conservation and commissioned a full replacement for Mary Sayles’s missing marker.

=== Placement of RWFA artifacts at Roger Williams University (1998) ===
In 1998, the RWFA deposited its archival collection—paintings, photographs, correspondence, artifacts, and bulletins dating back to the 1940s—at the Roger Williams University Library. The move provided long‑term preservation and public access to materials documenting the association and Williams family history.

=== Rededication of plaques at the Roger Williams National Memorial (2013) ===
In June 2013, approximately fifty RWFA members gathered at the Roger Williams National Memorial for the rededication of two bronze plaques honoring Williams. The ceremony was part of Rhode Island’s celebration of the 350th anniversary of its 1633 royal charter. Elsie Williams, a 104‑year‑old RWFA officer and longtime registrar, unveiled the plaques.

== See also ==
- Roger Williams
- Roger Williams National Memorial

== Sources ==
- "The History of Our Association". Roger Williams Family Association. 2025.
- "Roger Williams Family Association / Association Records". Roger Williams University Archives. 1911.
- "Unveil Great Statue of Roger Williams". The New York Times. 1939-06-30.
- Polichetti, Barbara (2013-06-23). "Descendants of Roger Williams gather in Providence..." Providence Journal.
- "The Life and Legacy of Roger Williams". Roger Williams University. 2026.
- "Bylaws of the Roger Williams Family Association". Roger Williams Family Association. 1998.
- "Roger Williams Family Association Collection". RIAMCO. 2026.
- "Roger Williams Family Association". Rhode Island Department of State. 2026.
- "Articles of Incorporation: Non-Business – RWFA". Rhode Island State Archives. 1937.
- "RWFA Bulletin Archive". Roger Williams Family Association. 2025.
- "RWFA Publications". Roger Williams Family Association. 2025.
- "Past Presidents". Roger Williams Family Association. 2025.
- "Roger Williams Statue (QR3)". National Park Service. 2010.
- DiPrete, Carol (1998-08-14). "RWU Library to house namesake's collection". Providence Journal.
- Dujardin, Richard C. (1984-10-09). "Senator Pell leads ceremony to dedicate N. Main St. park". Providence Journal.
- McCreanor, Bob (1983-12-04). "Artist Bob Breck is helping to correct an old R.I. wrong". Providence Journal.
- Foderaro, Lisa (1984-06-01). "R.I.'s 350th birthday bash begins". Providence Journal.
- "City's birthday party offers bands, a 'faire' and 'Roger Williams'". Providence Journal. 1986-06-21. p. A-04.
- Roger Williams National Memorial: Administrative History (Report). National Park Service. 2010.
- Roger Williams Family Association Bulletin No. 81. RWFA. 1994.
- Roger Williams Family Association Bulletin No. 82. RWFA. 1995.
