= Federation of State Humanities Councils =

American nonprofit supporting state humanities councils

- Formation: 1977; 49 years ago
- Type: Nonprofit
- Headquarters: 1530 Wilson Boulevard, Suite 340, Arlington, Virginia, U.S.
- President: Phoebe Stein
- Affiliations: National Endowment for the Humanities
- Website: www.statehumanities.org

The Federation of State Humanities Councils is a nonpartisan nonprofit organization based in Arlington, Virginia, that serves as the national membership association for the 56 state and jurisdictional humanities councils in the United States. Founded in 1977, the Federation advocates for the councils at the federal level, coordinates national initiatives, provides professional development and capacity-sharing services, and administers emergency grant programs supporting public humanities activities.

== History ==
The state humanities council system originated in the early 1970s following the creation of the National Endowment for the Humanities (NEH) in 1965 under legislation signed by President Lyndon B. Johnson. The NEH established pilot humanities committees in six states before the first 51 councils were organized, including those serving Puerto Rico and Washington, D.C. In 1971, the agency established its Division of Federal/State Partnership to coordinate with the councils.

Representatives of the state humanities councils voted to establish the Federation in 1977, locating its headquarters in Minneapolis. The organization relocated its headquarters to Washington, D.C., in 1986, and to Arlington, Virginia, in 2023.

Humanities councils in Guam, the Northern Mariana Islands, and American Samoa were formed between 1989 and 1994. The network later expanded to include the U.S. Virgin Islands, bringing the Federation's membership to 56 state and jurisdictional humanities councils. Each member council is an independently governed 501(c)(3) nonprofit organization.

The Federation's presidents have been Steve Weiland (1977–1986), Jamil Zainaldin (1986–1998), Gail Leftwich Kitch (1998–2004), Esther Mackintosh (2004–2020), and Phoebe Stein (2020–present).

== Funding roles ==
While the Federation is a separately funded membership association, it acts as the primary coordinator for its members' financial stability. The 56 individual state humanities councils rely on a public-private partnership model; they receive a substantial portion of their operational support through federal allocations from the NEH's Division of Federal/State Partnership, which they supplement through private donations, foundation grants, and select state-level appropriations.

The Federation's principal role in this system is advocating directly to Congress to protect and increase these federal allocations. The councils then use the secured funds locally to seed and manage community programs, including funding for local museums, libraries, historical societies, and regional book festivals.

== Activities ==
According to its 2024–2026 strategic plan, the Federation operates as a central resource and collective voice for its member jurisdictions by focusing on congressional advocacy, its partnership with the NEH, membership resource cultivation, and equity frameworks. The organization fulfills these goals through several core programs:

- Federal Advocacy and Legislative Briefings: The Federation is the sole body that advocates for federal appropriations for the collective state and jurisdictional humanities councils. It organizes "Humanities on the Hill," an annual three-day legislative event in Washington, D.C., where council representatives gather for briefing sessions and meet directly with lawmakers to request public funding.
- Legal Action: The organization engages in litigation to protect the financial stability of its network. In 2025, following sweeping federal budget rollbacks, the Federation and the Oregon Council for the Humanities filed a federal lawsuit in the U.S. District Court of Oregon against the NEH and the Department of Government Efficiency (DOGE) to void the mass cancellation of congressional grants, later submitting a motion for summary judgment to enjoin further terminations.
- Emergency Resource Management: The Federation secures independent, non-federal assets to offset network disruptions. Following a 2025 federal funding freeze, the Federation managed and distributed a $15 million emergency grant from the Andrew W. Mellon Foundation directly to individual state councils to stabilize local community programming.
- National Convenings: In partnership with the National Humanities Alliance (NHA), the Federation co-organizes the annual National Humanities Conference, a flagship professional meeting for humanities specialists, museum curators, and university scholars.
- Capacity-Sharing and Professional Development: The Federation manages data evaluation frameworks, communications networks, and professional development programs to assist council directors and board leadership with organizational management.

== Helen and Martin Schwartz Prize ==
Since 1982, the Federation has administered the Helen and Martin Schwartz Prize, which is regarded as the highest honor awarded to state and jurisdictional councils within the public humanities community. Established by philanthropists Helen and Martin Schwartz, the prize recognizes up to three outstanding public humanities programs annually. Nominations are reviewed by an independent panel of judges selected from past prize-winning council directors and board members.

The awards are divided into "council-conducted" and "grant-funded" categories, evaluating initiatives on their community collaboration, technology usage, sustainability, and commitment to diverse and accessible programming. The first Schwartz Prize was awarded in 1982 to the Rhode Island Committee for the Humanities.

== Sources ==
- "America's Humanities Councils Get a Lifeline" (Press release). Andrew W. Mellon Foundation. 29 April 2025.
- Blair, Elizabeth (7 August 2025). "Federal judge rules cuts to humanities grants were 'unlawful'". NPR.
- "About Us". Federation of State Humanities Councils.
- 2024-26 Strategic Plan (PDF) (Report). Federation of State Humanities Councils. January 2025.
- "Our History and Values". Federation of State Humanities Councils.
- "Save the Date: Humanities on the Hill 2026". Federation of State Humanities Councils. 28 October 2025.
- "Schwartz Prize Winners Archive". Federation of State Humanities Councils. 20 May 2022. Archived from the original on 3 October 2023.
- "The Schwartz Prize". Federation of State Humanities Councils. 27 October 2023. Archived from the original on 9 May 2023.
- Fields, Gary (16 May 2025). "Humanities groups sue Trump administration to reverse local funding cuts". Associated Press / CBS 42.
- "State and Jurisdictional Humanities Councils". National Endowment for the Humanities.
- Nietzel, Michael T. (8 May 2026). "Judge Rules That Feds' Mass Termination Of Humanities Grants Was Illegal". Forbes.
- Schuessler, Jennifer (29 April 2025). "Mellon Foundation Announces $15 Million for Humanities Councils". The New York Times.
- Skinner, David. "Founding the State Humanities Councils". National Endowment for the Humanities.
