= Kentucky Humanities Council =

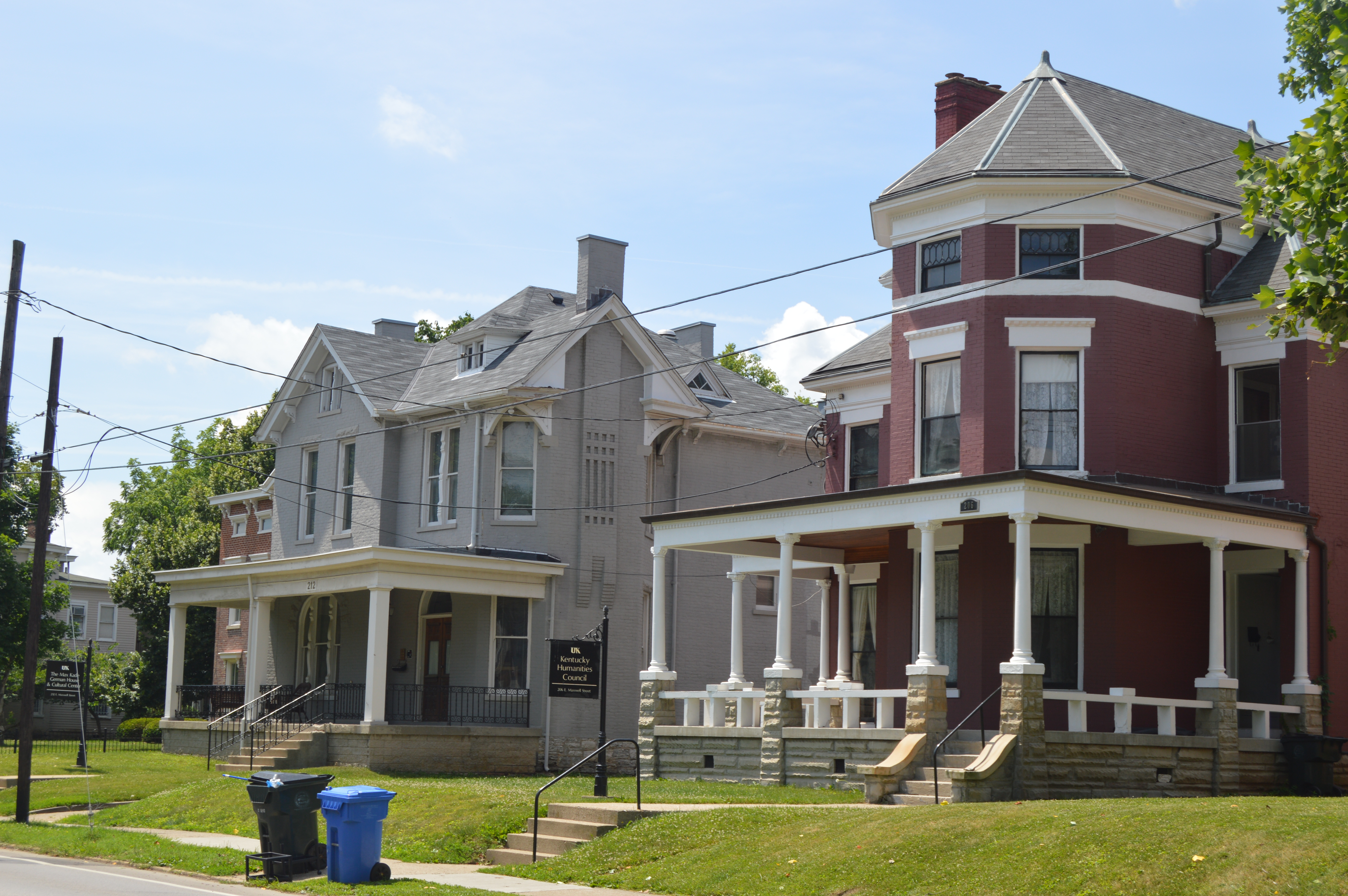
KHC offices in Lexington

The Kentucky Humanities Council, Inc. is an independent, nonprofit affiliate of the National Endowment for the Humanities in Washington, D.C. The Council is supported by the National Endowment and by private contributions. It is not a state agency, and receives no state funds. The group performs living history dramas and publishes Kentucky Humanities magazine.

== See also ==
- List of state humanities councils
