= Oregon Humanities =

Nonprofit organization based in Portland, Oregon, U.S.

- Logo
- Formation: 1971; 55 years ago
- Headquarters: 921 SW Washington St.
- Location: Portland, Oregon, U.S.
- Region served: Oregon
- Executive director: Adam Davis
- Website: oregonhumanities.org
- Formerly called: Oregon Council for the Humanities, Oregon Committee for the Humanities

Oregon Humanities, formerly known as the Oregon Council for the Humanities, is an independent, nonprofit affiliate of the National Endowment for the Humanities for the U.S. state of Oregon.

== Description and history ==
Oregon Humanities is an independent, nonprofit affiliate of the National Endowment for the Humanities (NEH), the federal agency of the U.S. government established by the National Foundation on the Arts and the Humanities Act of 1965 (Pub. L. 89–209) to support research, education, preservation, and public programs in the humanities.

The organization was established as the Oregon Committee for the Humanities in 1971 as one of 56 humanities councils in the states and territories of the United States. Since 2001, Oregon Humanities has been one of Oregon Cultural Trust's five partners. Its mission is to "connect people and communities through conversation, storytelling, and participatory programs to inspire understanding and collaborative change'", and its vision is "an Oregon that invites diverse perspectives, explores challenging questions and strives for just communities". Oregon Humanities is supported by grants and donations from individuals and works in partnership with libraries and organizations such as Adelante Mujeres, the Portland Children's Museum, and Portland Playhouse. The organization has also partnered with Cambia Health Solutions.

Established in 1971 as an independent nonprofit affiliate of the NEH, Christopher Zinn became Executive Director in 2003. Following, Cara Ungar became the Executive Director in 2007. NEH profiled Ungar in their November–December 2012 issue of Humanities.. Under Ungar's leadership, the organization was rebranded to Oregon Humanities (with the catchphrase: "O.Hm The Sound of Hearing a New Idea,"). From 2007-2013, the organization shifted focus and launched new programs, including the lauded Conversation Project, Think and Drink, Idea Lab, and Happy Camp (an opportunity for rural, urban, high-achieving, and at-risk youth to come together and reimagine what the "pursuit of happiness" could mean). Ungar left after 2013, having positioned the organization as a statewide leader advancing democracy, civic dialogue, community connection, and public humanities. Adam Davis became Oregon Humanities' fifth executive director in 2013, replacing Cara Ungar. NEH profiled Davis in their November–December 2015 issue of Humanities. Robert Arellano, an author, musician, and educator who teaches at Southern Oregon University and created its Center for Emerging Media and Digital Arts in 2010, joined the affiliate's board of directors in January 2016.

== Programs and activities ==
Oregon Humanities' programs include: Oregon Humanities magazine; The Conversation Project, a series of facilitated discussions hosted by a local businesses, community group, or nonprofit organizations on subjects relevant to their members; Humanity in Perspective, a free college-level humanities course offered to low income adults without a college education; "Consider This" events, hosted quarterly; and grants to other organizations.

"Humanity in Perspective" was created in collaboration with Reed College and has been offered in Portland, Salem, and the Eastern Oregon Correctional Institution.

In March 2015, the organization debuted "Future: Portland", a video inspired by Ifanyi Bell's essay in the "Quandary" issue of Oregon Humanities about the challenges of growing up black in Portland ("The Air I Breathe", Fall–Winter 2014). The video, which was produced by Bell and Brushfire Creative Partners with funds provided by the James F. and Marion L. Miller Foundation, addresses gentrification and features local black civic leaders sharing their perspectives, describing the loss of the city's black communities, and expressing their hope for cultural restoration.

=== The Conversation Project ===
The "Conversation Project" series "brings Oregonians together to discuss their differences, beliefs and backgrounds about important issues and ideas". According to the Oregon Culture Trust, the series "offers Oregon nonprofits free, educational public discussion programs about important topics that affect our daily lives". Its stated goal is to "give diverse communities statewide—neighbors and strangers alike—the opportunity to engage in humanities-based, public conversations that are timely and relevant".

Discussions are facilitated by "humanities scholars—artists, community leaders, innovators, provocateurs, and other engaged thinkers", having been recruited by Oregon Humanities. The organization seeks facilitators who are "smart, passionate about ideas, able to listen to others, and curious-individuals who understand the role of the humanities in the public sphere, but who are also teachers at heart, regardless of their day job".

Between 2011 and 2016 Oregon Humanities offered "Why Aren't There More Black People in Oregon?", a conversation led by Walidah Imarisha about the history of racism in Oregon, as part of its "Conversation Project" series. During March–May 2016, Linfield College hosted events addressing diversity, including: "White Out? The Future of Racial Diversity in Oregon", "Northwest Mixtape: Hip Hop Culture and Influences", and "Mind the Gaps: How Gender Shapes our Lives".
