= Rhode Island Humanities =

State humanities council in Rhode Island, United States

- Rhode Island Council for the Humanities
- Formation: 1973; 53 years ago
- Type: Nonprofit
- Tax ID no.: 05-0376246
- Headquarters: 131 Washington St., Suite 210, Providence, Rhode Island, U.S.
- Executive director: Elizabeth Francis
- Affiliations: National Endowment for the Humanities
- Revenue: US$989,225 (2025)
- Expenses: US$929,057 (2025)
- Award: Schwartz Prize (1982, 2001, 2023)
- Website: rihumanities.org
- Formerly called: Rhode Island Committee for the Humanities

Rhode Island Humanities (legally the Rhode Island Council for the Humanities) is the state humanities council for Rhode Island and an independent 501(c)(3) affiliate of the National Endowment for the Humanities (NEH). Based in Providence, it awards grants for public history, cultural heritage, civic education, and community engagement; co-operates the Rhode Tour public history app; and co-produces the Rhode Island Civic Health Index.

Founded in 1973 as the Rhode Island Committee for the Humanities, the organization has received the Federation of State Humanities Councils' Schwartz Prize three times, most recently in 2023 for the Rhode Island Civic Health Index. In 2025 it lost much of its federal funding when the NEH terminated its grants to state humanities councils, forcing it to suspend most federally funded grantmaking.

== History ==
The organization was established in 1973 as the Rhode Island Committee for the Humanities, one of 56 state and territorial humanities councils created and funded by the National Endowment for the Humanities. It began operating on April 1, 1973, with two staff members and a 15‑member board promoting various fields in the humanities.

It was later renamed the Rhode Island Council for the Humanities, which remains its legal name; since 2023 it has operated as Rhode Island Humanities. By 2018, the council had awarded more than US$8 million in grants to more than 650 organizations, as well as to independent researchers and filmmakers, since its founding. As of 2025, the organization was governed by a volunteer board of directors numbering about twenty members and supported by a professional staff of about seven people.

The organization celebrated its 50th anniversary on October 7, 2023, with "50Fest," a free public event at the WaterFire Arts Center in Providence that featured exhibitions, film screenings, and community activities. In November 2024, it co-hosted the National Humanities Conference in Providence, which drew nearly 900 attendees and featured an address by NEH chair Shelly C. Lowe.

=== Executive directors ===
- Tom Roberts (1973–1995)
- Joseph Finkhouse (1995–1999)
- M. Drake Patten (1999–2004)
- Sara Archambault (2004–2007)
- Mary-Kim Arnold (2007–2012)
- Elizabeth Francis (2013–present)

== Grantmaking ==
Rhode Island Humanities administers several grant programs supporting public history, cultural heritage, civic education, and community engagement:

- Major Grants – awards up to US$12,000 for public humanities projects.
- Mini Grants – awards up to US$2,000 for smaller projects and individual researchers.
- THRIVE Grants – state‑funded general operating support grants of US$5,000 for small cultural heritage and local historical organizations, launched in 2024.

The council is also a partner, with the Rhode Island State Council on the Arts (RISCA) and the Rhode Island Foundation, in the Rhode Island Expansion Arts Program, which provides three years of funding and organizational assistance to community-based, culturally diverse arts and cultural organizations.

From fiscal years 2019 through 2023, NEH grants to Rhode Island organizations and individuals totaled about US$9.7 million across 45 awards.

During the COVID-19 pandemic, the council distributed NEH relief funds under the CARES Act and the American Rescue Plan Act, including small project grants and, jointly with RISCA, US$8,000 operating grants to cultural nonprofits through the RI Culture, Humanities and Arts Recovery Grants (RI CHARG) program in 2021.

In April 2025, the NEH, acting under the direction of the Department of Government Efficiency, terminated its funding to all state humanities councils, costing the organization more than US$500,000. It received emergency grants of US$200,000 from the Andrew W. Mellon Foundation and US$50,000 from the Rhode Island Foundation. A lawsuit by the Federation of State Humanities Councils and Oregon Humanities, which Rhode Island supported as an amicus, won a preliminary injunction in August 2025, but the NEH cut the councils' share of its funding by about half, and the case remained pending in 2026. The organization postponed its 2025 major grants until 2026 and, as of September 2026, had not resumed other federally funded grantmaking; state-funded THRIVE grants continued.

== Public programs ==
=== Rhode Island Civic Health Index ===
From 2020 to 2021, the organization conducted "Culture Is Key," a research initiative examining the relationship between cultural participation and civic health in Rhode Island. This work led to the 2022 publication of the first Rhode Island Civic Health Index, produced in partnership with the National Conference on Citizenship and the Rhode Island Department of State, with funding from the NEH's "A More Perfect Union" initiative and the Rhode Island Foundation; it was developed with ten paid community partners. The project received the Federation of State Humanities Councils' Schwartz Prize for outstanding work in the public humanities in 2023. In 2026, the organization began work on a second edition with the same partners and twelve community partners, funded by private foundations including the Rhode Island Foundation, with publication planned for 2027.

=== XIX: Shall Not Be Denied ===
In December 2019, the council and the Rhode Island Secretary of State's office launched "XIX: Shall Not Be Denied," a statewide initiative promoting programs marking the centennial of the Nineteenth Amendment. In February 2021, the council awarded US$40,000 through the initiative to seven nonprofit organizations working with communities facing barriers to democratic participation, and to the Department of State for a traveling exhibit, Votes for Women – Inspiring Change. The grants were part of the Federation of State Humanities Councils' national "Why It Matters: Civic and Electoral Participation" initiative, funded by the Andrew W. Mellon Foundation.

=== Rhode Tour ===
Rhode Tour, a free mobile app and website featuring public history stories, was created as a joint initiative of the council, Brown University's John Nicholas Brown Center for Public Humanities and Cultural Heritage, and the Rhode Island Historical Society. The council and its partners built the platform's infrastructure, while historical and cultural organizations and independent researchers write the individual tours; by 2018, four years after its launch, it offered more than 22 tours and 200 stories. The council and the historical society continue to co-operate it. Through the NEH's 2024 "United We Stand: Connecting Through Culture" initiative against hate-motivated violence, the organization assembled "Creating Home in Rhode Island," a nine-stop tour drawn from existing Rhode Tour stories about communities finding refuge and building lasting institutions in the state.

=== Other initiatives ===
Earlier council initiatives included Catalyzing Newport, which brought local organizations and visiting scholars together to develop ideas for a more resilient and sustainable city; participants worked with a futurist on a pop-up installation, "Mayor's Office, 2061," showing how rising sea levels could affect Newport's cultural and historic sites. In 2018, the council partnered with Rhode Island Public Radio on "Journalism, Democracy, and Community," a project connecting reporters with local residents on topics of the residents' choosing.

=== Semiquincentennial ===
Executive director Elizabeth Francis has served as secretary of Rhode Island's state commission for the 250th anniversary of the American Revolution. In 2026, the organization co-hosted the "RI250 Cultural Convening" with the RI 250 Commission and RISCA, part of the state's observance of the Semiquincentennial of the United States.

== Schwartz Prize recognitions ==
The Schwartz Prize is the highest national honor awarded to humanities councils by the Federation of State Humanities Councils. Rhode Island's humanities council has received the prize several times for exemplary public humanities programming.

- 1982 – "The Trinity Humanities Series: The Dramatic Work as a Historical, Cultural Document"
- 2001 – "Action Speaks 2000: A Topical Forum: Under‑Appreciated Dates of the 20th Century That Changed America"
- 2023 – "Rhode Island Civic Health Index"

== Awards program (2002–2022) ==
From 2002 to 2022, Rhode Island Humanities presented annual awards at its "Celebration of the Humanities" event to recognize local and national contributions to public scholarship, creative work, and innovation.

The program had four award categories:

- Honorary Chairs' Award for Lifetime Achievement, whose recipients included U.S. Senator Claiborne Pell (2005), federal judge O. Rogeriee Thompson (2011), music festival founder George Wein (2013), and museum director Roger Mandle (2015).
- Tom Roberts Prize for Creative Achievement, whose recipients included musician Bill Harley (2010), WaterFire creator Barnaby Evans (2011), museum director Lorén Spears (2016), storyteller Len Cabral (2017), and Mixed Magic Theatre (2021).
- Innovation in the Humanities Award, whose recipients included author Judy Barrett Litoff (2007) and cartoonist Don Bousquet (2009).
- Public Humanities Scholar Award, whose recipients included park ranger John J. McNiff (2014) and historian Marta V. Martínez (2016).

== Sources ==
- Arnold, Mary-Kim. "Bio".
- Bessette, James (December 5, 2023). "R.I. Humanities receives Schwartz Prize for Civic Health Index work". Providence Business News.
- Bramson (July 31, 2017). "Seeing the city through the Rhode Tour app". The Providence Journal.
- Daley, Lauren (October 5, 2023). "Best things to do in Rhode Island this week: Oct. 6-13". The Boston Globe.
- "Schwartz Prize Winners Archive". Federation of State Humanities Councils. 2023.
- Finkhouse, Joseph (April 16, 1996). "Senate Speeches on the Arts and Humanities (1994–1996): Correspondence 02" (Letter to Claiborne Pell). Claiborne Pell Papers. University of Rhode Island – via DigitalCommons@URI.
- "Providence Walks: Self-Guided Historic Walking Tours". GoProvidence.
- Lakin, Roni (December 2, 2024). "Building the Future at the National Humanities Conference". Boston University Center for the Humanities.
- "Impact by the Numbers for Rhode Island" (PDF). National Endowment for the Humanities. August 2024.
- "Federal judge rules cuts to humanities grants were 'unlawful'". NPR. August 7, 2025 – via Georgia Public Broadcasting.
- "Humanities Grants Support Newport Projects and Others". Newport This Week. September 17, 2026.
- "Governor Lincoln D. Chafee Names Three Nominees for the Rhode Island Economic Development Corporation Board" (Press release). Office of the Governor of Rhode Island. April 11, 2013.
- "Oregon Leads Multi-State Legal Effort to Restore Funding for Humanities Programs Across the Country" (Press release). Oregon Department of Justice. July 2, 2025.
- "Rhode Island Council For The Humanities". Nonprofit Explorer. ProPublica.
- "Rhode Island Committee for the Humanities begins operations". The Providence Journal. July 30, 1974. p. 11.
- "Appointment". The Providence Journal. June 28, 1999. p. C-06 – via NewsBank.
- "Council for Humanities chief leaving for job in Berkshires". The Providence Journal. January 29, 2004. p. B-03 – via NewsBank.
- "Rhode Island briefs". The Providence Journal. December 7, 2006. p. B-02 – via NewsBank.
- "COVID-19 Relief Funding". Rhode Island Humanities. April 21, 2020.
- "RI CHARG". Rhode Island Humanities. July 9, 2021.
- "$40,000 awarded through XIX: Shall Not Be Denied: Why It Matters Initiative grants from Rhode Island Council for the Humanities" (Press release). Rhode Island Council for the Humanities. February 1, 2021.
- "Culture Is Key". Rhode Island Humanities. January 11, 2022.
- 2023 Annual Report (PDF) (Report). Rhode Island Humanities. 2023.
- "Celebrate (archived)". Rhode Island Humanities.
- "THRIVE Grantmaking". Rhode Island Humanities. January 26, 2024.
- "Nearly 900 gather for National Humanities Conference in Providence". Rhode Island Humanities. December 11, 2024.
- "Grantmaking". Rhode Island Humanities. September 2025.
- 2025 Annual Report (PDF) (Report). Rhode Island Humanities. 2025.
- "History & Mission". Rhode Island Humanities.
- "Recent Grants". Rhode Island Humanities.
- "2027 RI Civic Health Index". Rhode Island Humanities.
- "Joint Ventures". Rhode Island State Council on the Arts.
- "About". Rhode Tour.
- "Creating Home in Rhode Island". Rhode Tour.
- Roberts, Tom (Fall 2021). "Brahmin of the People: Senator Claiborne Pell Helped Bring the Arts and Humanities to Every State". Humanities. Vol. 42, no. 4. National Endowment for the Humanities.
- Rubinton, Noel (Summer 2018). "Executive Function with Elizabeth Francis". Humanities. Vol. 39, no. 3. National Endowment for the Humanities.
- Schuessler, Jennifer; Towfighi, Michaela (August 5, 2025). "Humanities Endowment Funds Trump's Priorities After Ending Old Grants". The New York Times.
- "Oregon Humanities fights federal funding cuts in court". Statesman Journal. August 12, 2026.
- Hernandez, Luis; Baumgartner, James; Tasca, Joe; Lindo, Mareva (April 18, 2025). "Medicaid work rules could cut benefits for thousands, DOGE slashes RI Humanities funding, and more". The Weekly Catch. The Public's Radio.
- "The Humanities and Civic Health in Rhode Island". University of Rhode Island Center for the Humanities.
