= Pennsylvania Humanities Council =

Non-profit affiliate of the National Endowment for the Humanities

- Formation: 1973; 53 years ago
- Type: Nonprofit
- Purpose: Humanities, Community Development
- Location: Philadelphia, Pennsylvania, U.S.
- Region served: Pennsylvania
- Key people: Laurie Zierer; (Executive Director); Silas Chamberlin; (Chairman, Board of Trustees)
- Website: PAHumanities.org
- Formerly called: Public Committee for the Humanities in Pennsylvania (1973–1980)

Pennsylvania Humanities Council (PHC) is a non-profit affiliate of the National Endowment for the Humanities based in Philadelphia, Pennsylvania. It is one of 56 state humanities councils founded in the wake of the National Foundation on the Arts and Humanities Act of 1965. The Executive Director is Laurie Zierer.

== History ==
The earliest state councils were organized in 1971, when Pennsylvania’s council was founded with a start-up grant from the University of Pennsylvania. In 1980, the name Pennsylvania Humanities Council (PHC) was adopted and the organization settled in Philadelphia.

In the early years, PHC's activity consisted almost exclusively of issuing grants to non-profit organizations with funds provided by NEH. During the 1980s and early 1990s, they incorporated staff-directed special projects and packaged programs.

In 1994, PHC focused on expanding access to the humanities in Pennsylvania beyond groups traditionally interested in cultural events. They began to support local groups, working to build the programming capacity of small historical societies, museums, art centers, libraries, senior centers and community groups.

=== Past programs and activities ===
Past programs included Commonwealth Speakers, the televised series Humanities on the Road and a partnership with the Penn State Reads program. Additional activities include participation in the Pittsburgh Humanities Festival, Pulitzer Prize Centennial Campfires Initiative, and Democracy and the Informed Citizen Initiative.

== Activities ==
In 2013, Pennsylvania Humanities Council shifted its focus to civic engagement, education, and humanities advocacy. Its programs are Chester Made, Pennsylvania Community Heart & Soul Communities, Penn VUB Partnership, and Teen Reading Lounge.

=== Chester Made ===
Chester Made is an initiative developed by Pennsylvania Humanities Council to recognize and promote arts and culture in Chester, Pennsylvania, for community revitalization. In 2013 PHC received two major grants from the National Endowment for the Arts and The Pew Center for Arts & Heritage for the development of a Chester Made Exploration Zone.

=== Pennsylvania Community Heart & Soul Communities ===
Pennsylvania Humanities Council partners with select Pennsylvania towns to incorporate humanities into their planning processes using the Orton Family Foundation's Community Heart & Soul® method as a framework.

=== Penn Veterans Upward Bound partnership ===
Pennsylvania Humanities Council supports humanities programming and cultural experiences for students in University of Pennsylvania’s Veterans Upward Bound program, part of the Federal TRIO Programs.

=== Teen Reading Lounge ===
Teen Reading Lounge is a non-traditional book club for teens between the ages of 12 and 18. Teens help to create the reading list for their program sites and work with trained facilitators to design creative projects. Teen Reading Lounge sites are spread throughout Pennsylvania.
