= Humanities New York =

New York City arts nonprofit organization

Humanities New York, formerly the New York Council for the Humanities, is a 501(c)(3) organization based in New York City. It is the New York State affiliate of the National Endowment for the Humanities. It was founded in 1975.

Between 2008 and 2012, the organization awarded institutions and individuals in New York $68.7 million for work on projects, including funding for the first significant television treatment of the history of the War of 1812.
