= Roger Williams National Memorial =

- U.S. National Register of Historic Places
- U.S. National Memorial
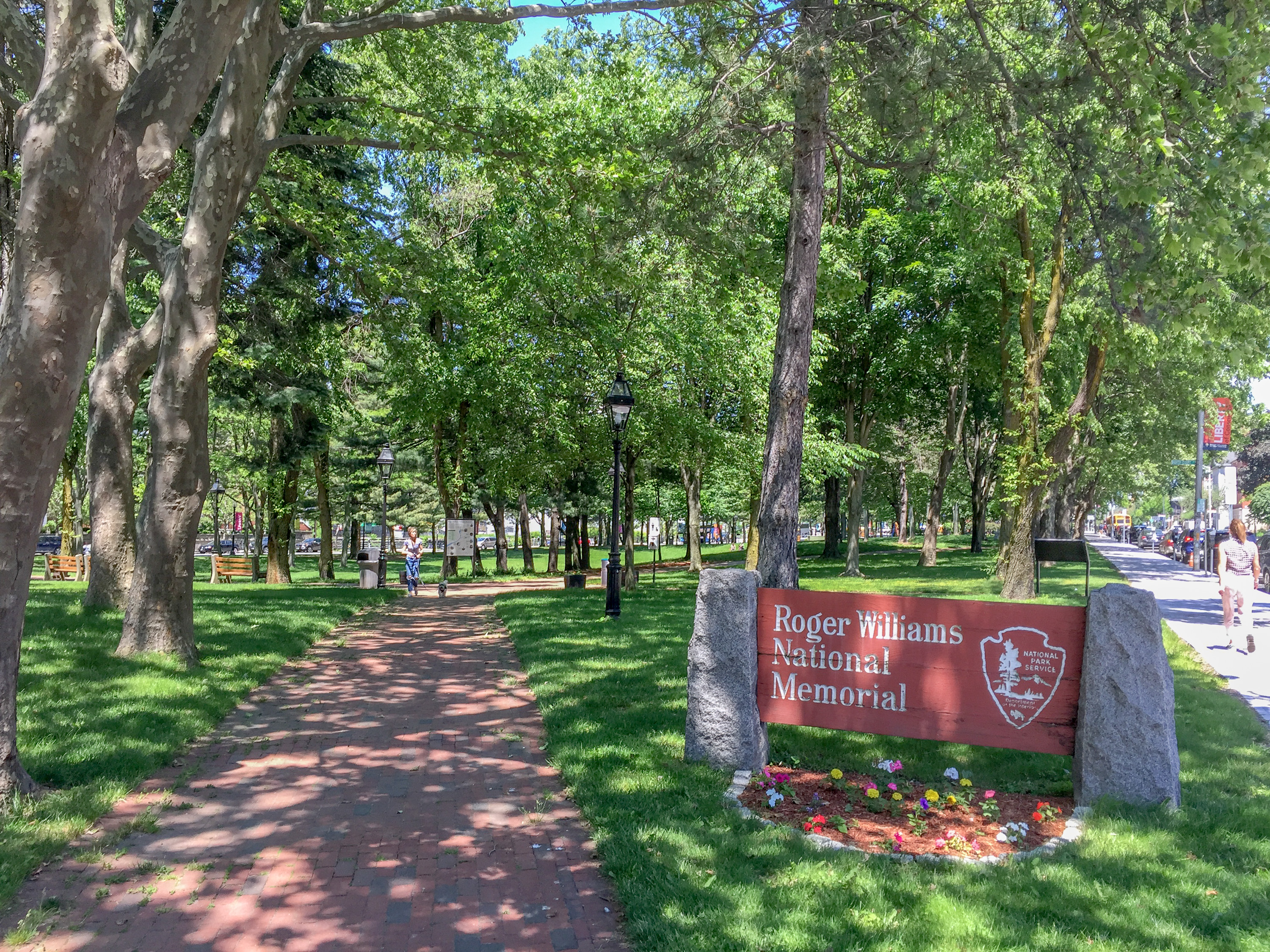

- Location within Rhode Island Location within the United States
- Location: Providence, Rhode Island
- Coordinates: 41.83038°N 71.41089°W
- Area: 4.56 acres (1.85 ha)
- Built: 1636
- Architect: Norman Isham
- Visitation: 38,959 (2025)
- Website: Roger Williams National Memorial
- NRHP reference No.: 66000942
- Added to NRHP: October 15, 1966

The Roger Williams National Memorial is a landscaped urban park located on a common lot of the original settlement of Providence, Rhode Island, established by minister Roger Williams in 1636. The national memorial commemorates the life of Williams, who co-founded the Colony of Rhode Island and Providence Plantations and championed religious freedom. The park is bounded by North Main, Canal, and Smith Streets, and Park Row.

== Description ==
The Roger Williams National Memorial is a 4.5-acre (1.8 ha) park located near the eastern bank of the Moshassuck River, east of the Rhode Island State House and north of Downtown Providence. It stands at the base of College Hill, upon which the early settlement of Providence was concentrated. The memorial is separated from the river by Canal Street, and bounded on the other three sides by Smith Street, Park Row, and North Main Street. The southern portion of the park has a relatively open grassy area ringed by trees, while the northern portion is more landscaped, with the visitor center housed in the 1736 Antram-Gray House (Note: Also known as the William Antram House) at the northeast corner, and a parking area on the west side. Major features in the northern section include the Vernon Grove and the site of the spring which prompted Williams to select the site.

The park's visitor center features an exhibit and video about Roger Williams and the founding of Rhode Island, as well as information about historic sites in Providence.

== Administrative history ==
The national memorial was authorized on October 22, 1965. The memorial was listed on the National Register of Historic Places on October 15, 1966. The site was developed in the late 1970s after the land acquisition was completed and the buildings on the land were demolished. It was the only unit of the National Park System in Rhode Island until 2014 when the Blackstone River Valley National Historical Park was designated. (Note: Touro Synagogue National Historic Site in Newport is an affiliated area of the National Park Service, but not formally part of the system.)

== Gallery ==
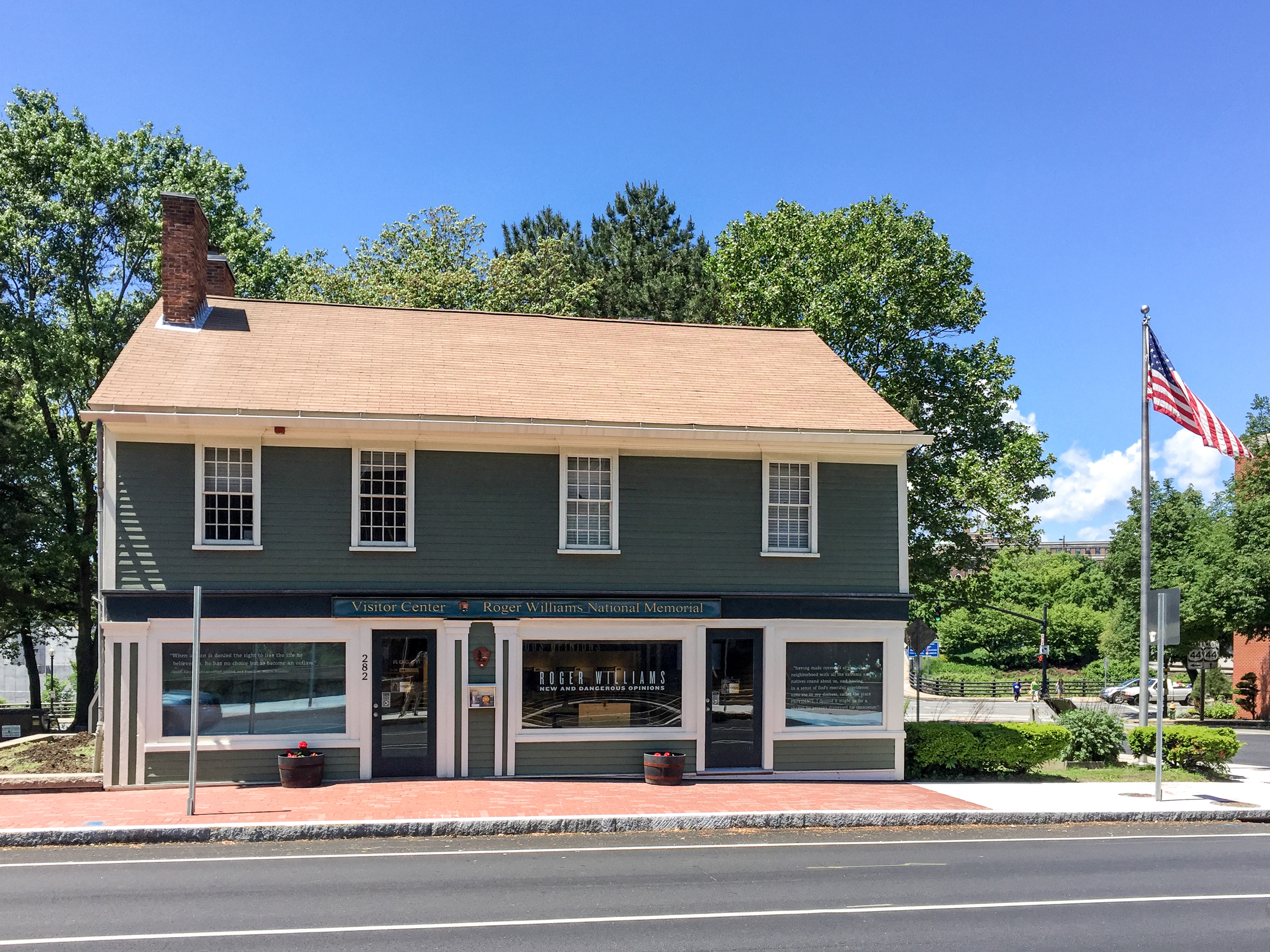
The 1736 Antram-Gray House serves as the park's Visitor Center

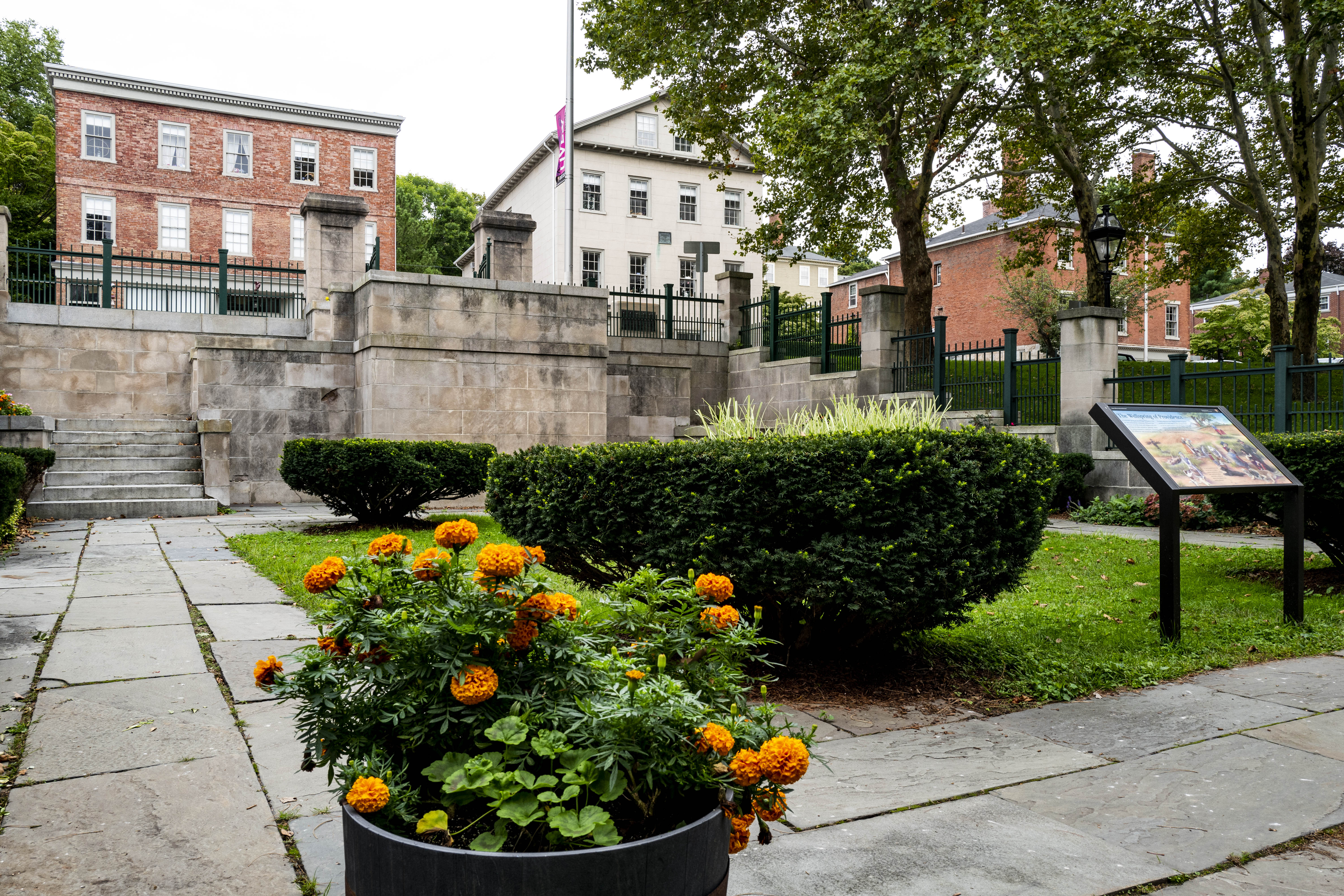
The site commemorating the spring discovered in 1636 by Roger Williams

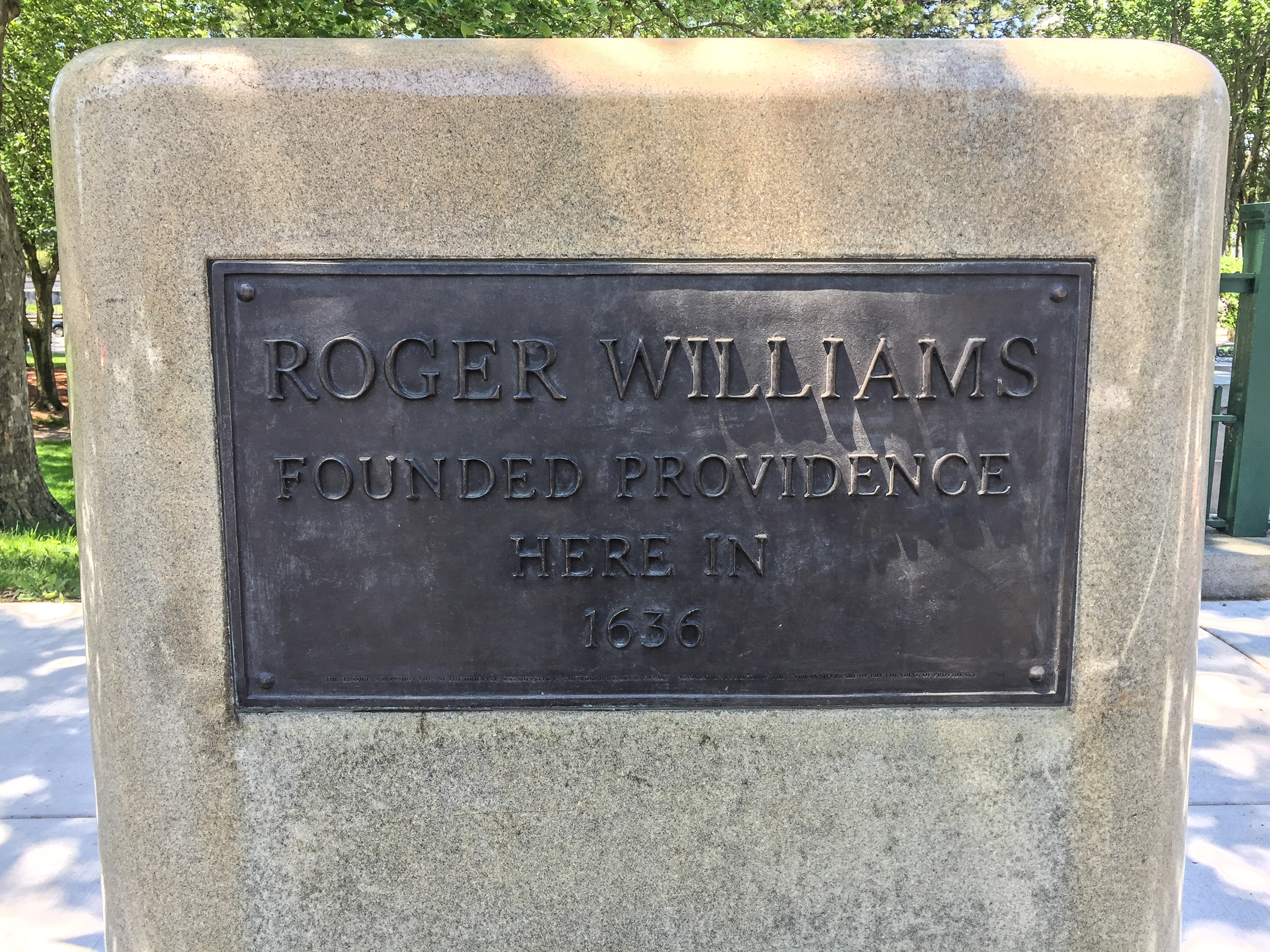
A plaque at the site

== See also ==
- List of national memorials of the United States
- National Register of Historic Places listings in Providence, Rhode Island
- Boston Common
