= Public humanities =

Public humanities is the work of engaging diverse publics in reflecting on heritage, traditions, and history, and the relevance of the humanities to the current conditions of civic and cultural life. Public humanities is usually practiced within federal, state, nonprofit and community-based cultural organizations that engage people in conversations, facilitate and present lectures, exhibitions, performances and other programs for the general public on topics such as history, philosophy, popular culture and the arts. Public Humanities also exists within universities as a collaborative enterprise between communities and faculty, staff, and students.

== Definitions ==
Public humanities projects include exhibitions and programming related to historic preservation, oral history, archives, material culture, public art, cultural heritage, and cultural policy. The National Endowment for the Humanities notes that public humanities projects it has supported in the past include "interpretation at historic sites, television and radio productions, museum exhibitions, podcasts, short videos, digital games, websites, mobile apps, and other digital media." Many practitioners of public humanities are invested in ensuring the accessibility and relevance of the humanities to the general public or community groups.

The American Council of Learned Societies' National Task Force on Scholarship and the Public Humanities suggests that the nature of public humanities work is to teach the public the findings of academic scholarship: it sees "scholarship and the public humanities not as two distinct spheres but as parts of a single process, the process of taking private insight, testing it, and turning it into public knowledge." Others, such as former museum director Nina Simon and Harvard professor Doris Sommer, suggest a more balanced understanding of the ways in which history, heritage, and culture are shared between the academy and the public. These approaches draw on the notion of shared historical authority.

Subfields of the public humanities include public history, public sociology, public folklore, public anthropology, public philosophy, historic preservation, museum studies, museum education, cultural heritage management, community archaeology, public art, collection management and public science.

== Programs ==
Several universities have established programs in the public humanities (or have otherwise expressed commitments to public humanities via the creation of centers, degrees, or certificate programs with investments in various forms of "public" work). Programs include:

- Georgetown University offers a stand-alone MA in the Engaged & Public Humanities as well as a Graduate Certificate program.
- Brown University's John Nicholas Brown Center for Public Humanities and Cultural Heritage (JNBC) supported public humanities programs and offered a stand-alone MA in Public Humanities, a Certificate in Public Humanities for PhD students, and a transitional MA in Public Humanities for PhD students in American Studies. In December 2023, the JNBC announced that the center would be renamed the John Nicholas Brown Center for Advanced Studies and the MA program in Public Humanities was put on hold. In the wake of this announcement, Brown's Ruth J. Simmons Center for the Study of Slavery and Justice began offering an MA in Integrative Studies "with a focus in public humanities." The new program started in Fall 2024.
- Carolina Public Humanities at the University of North Carolina at Chapel Hill offers extensive public outreach programs, a dedicated K12 teacher training subsidiary (Carolina K12), and a state-outreach program in partnership with the state's community colleges.
- Indiana University–Purdue University Indianapolis is home to the Indianapolis Arts and Humanities Institute, which organizes public events and offers grant funding, artist residencies, and workshops, along with producing original research. It is a founding institution for the Anthropocenes Network and the COVID-19 Oral History Project.
- The Institute for Women Surfers is a grassroots educational initiative in the Public Humanities that brings together women surfers, activists, artists, business owners, scientists and educators, to create spaces of peer teaching, learning, and mutual aid.
- Michigan State University was hosting a Public Humanities Collaborative as of 2007.
- New York University offers a Certificate in Public Humanities through their Public Humanities Initiative in Graduate Education.
- Oakland University in 2019 chartered a Center for Public Humanities.
- Portland State University, whose Portland Center for Public Humanities provides a yearlong forum of talks, roundtables, and workshops.
- Rutgers University–Newark, whose Public Humanities track in the American Studies MA program.
- University of Arizona established the Department of Public & Applied Humanities in 2017. As of 2024, their BA has eleven tracks: Business Administration; Consumer, Market & Retail Studies; Engineering Approaches; Environmental Systems; Fashion Studies; Game Studies; Medicine; Plant Studies; Public Health; Rural Leadership & Renewal; and Spatial Organization & Design Thinking.
- University of Maryland, Baltimore County has a Minor in Public Humanities. The Department of American Studies (AMST) hosts and supervises the minor in AMST’s Orser Center for the Study of Place, Community, and Culture, in collaboration with the Dresher Center for the Humanities.
- University of Michigan - Ann Arbor offers the Rackham Program in Public Scholarship.
- University of Sheffield, which offers an MA in Public Humanities with pathways in digital humanities, public engagement and cultural heritage.
- University of Western Ontario has a program called The Public Humanities at Western.
- University of Wisconsin–Madison has a public scholarship program, Public Humanities Exchange that supports collaborative work between humanities grad students and the community.
- The Walter Chapin Simpson Center for the Humanities at the University of Washington offers a Certificate in Public Scholarship.
- Wheaton College (IL) offers a undergraduate fellowship in Public Humanities and Arts, as a part of their Aequitas Fellowship program
- Yale University, whose MA program in Public Humanities is part of the American Studies Program at the Graduate School of Arts and Sciences.

== Publications ==
Public Humanities work can take the form of written communication in news magazines as well as in academic journals and books.

In 2024, Cambridge University Press launched an open-access international journal for the Public humanities which aims "to create a venue for sharing knowledge about the intersections of humanities scholarship and public life".
