= Omas gegen Rechts =

Austrian and German anti-right-wing movement

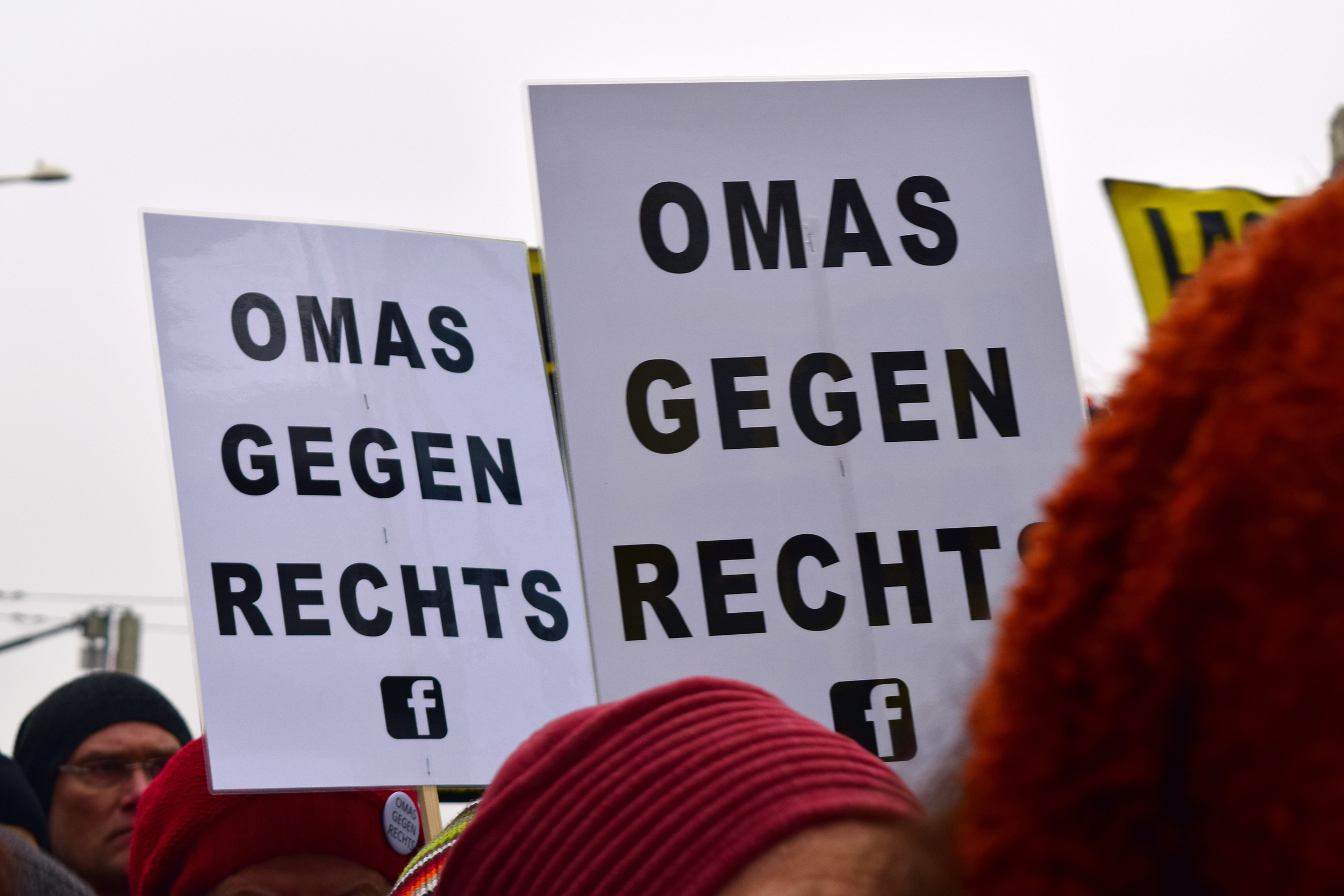
- Black & white posters at a Vienna demonstration
- Formation: 2017
- Founder: Susanne Scholl; Monika Salzer; Anna Ohnweiler
- Founded at: Vienna, Austria
- Type: Initiative
- Purpose: Opposition of far-right politics
- Official language: German
- Awards: Paul-Spiegel-Preis für Zivilcourage of the Central Council of Jews in Germany, Aachen Peace Prize
- Website: www.omas-gegen-rechts.org

Omas gegen Rechts ([ˈoːmas ˈɡeː.ɡn̩ ʁɛçtʰs]; Grannies against the Right) is a Bürgerinitiative (initiative of citizens) in Germany and Austria. Founded in Vienna in 2017, in protest at extreme right-wing political positions, a German initiative was founded in 2018. Its members are mostly women in retirement or close to legal retirement age, concerned about developments in politics and social life that they regard as detrimental to a future for their grandchildren. Omas gegen Rechts were awarded the Paul Spiegel Prize for civil courage by the Central Council of Jews in Germany in 2020.

== History ==
The initiative Omas gegen Rechts was founded in Vienna in 2017 by journalist Susanne Scholl and Monika Salzer, a retired pastor. Salzer said that it was in response to the coalition of the Austrian People's Party and the Freedom Party of Austria during the first Kurz government. She wrote a book explaining why women who experienced life fight for the future of their grandchildren, Warum wir für die Zukunft unserer Enkel kämpfen.

Beginning in spring 2018, the Omas gegen Rechts is also active in Germany, as initiated by Anna Ohnweiler, a former teacher and social worker who grew up in socialist Romania. An association was founded and according to Deutsche Welle as of November 2020, it has 3000 members, a fifth of them male, and the movement is active in more than 70 towns. The Berliner Zeitung noted around 100 regional groups in Germany as of 2020.

== Actions ==
In Germany and Austria, the Omas gegen Rechts appear at various demonstrations and events. Pink or colorful knitted hats, so-called "pussyhats", serve as a distinguishing mark. According to the organisation, the caps are "signs of non-violent resistance and solidarity".

In February 2020, the choir of the local section in Munich of Omas gegen Rechts performed together with Sarah Hakenberg on the ZDF TV programme Die Anstalt. The performance was a response to right-wing outrage at the song "Meine Oma ist 'ne Umweltsau" ("My grand-mother is an old environmental pig").

On 4 July 2020, Omas gegen Rechts supported the demonstration organized by the SPÖ Braunau for the preservation of the Hitler birthplace memorial stone in Braunau am Inn, Austria. Speakers against the "neutralization of history" planned by the Ministry of the Interior were Susanne Scholl, Robert Eiter from the Upper Austrian Network against Racism and Right-Wing Extremism, the writer Ludwig Laher and Member of the National Council Sabine Schatz.

== Goals ==
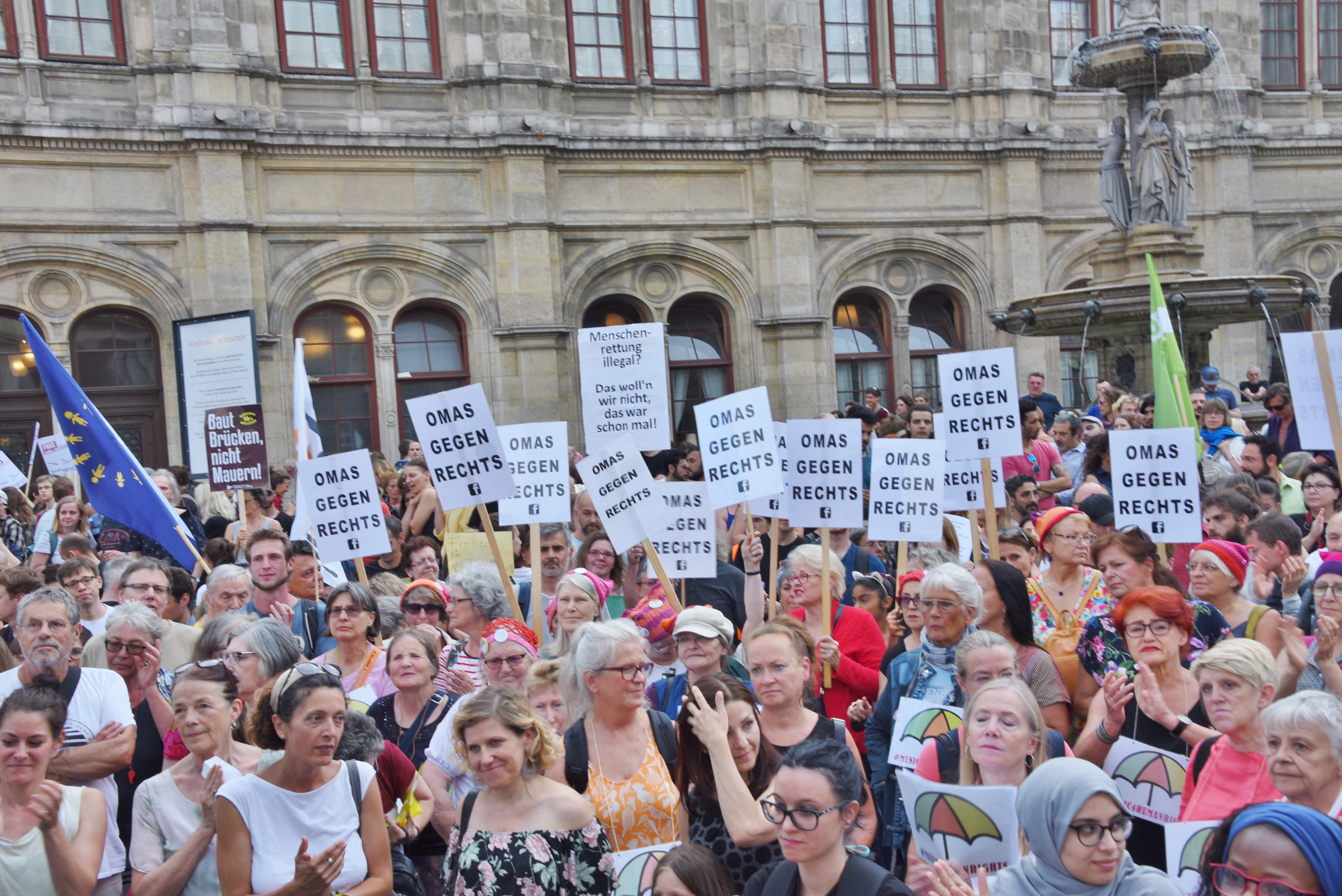
Omas gegen Rechts in Vienna in 2019, against the imprisonment of Carola Rackete

The initiative is active against antisemitism, racism and misogyny. It points at the danger of fascist tendencies, observed in Austria, Germany and other European countries. The initiative supports equal opportunity and tolerance and supports the Fridays for Future movement. Regional groups participated in counter-protests against protests over COVID-19 policies in Germany.

== Awards ==
In December 2019, Omas gegen Rechts received the Integrationspreis of Freiburg im Breisgau, and in November 2020 the Paul Spiegel Prize for Civic Courage (Paul-Spiegel-Preis für Zivilcourage) of the Central Council of Jews in Germany.

The group was awarded the 2024 Aachen Peace Prize [de].

== See also ==
- Grandmothers of the Plaza de Mayo (Argentina)
- Granny Peace Brigade (United States and Canada)
- Mothers of the Plaza de Mayo (Argentina)
- Peace Mothers (Turkey)
- Raging Grannies (United States and Canada)
