= Consortium of Humanities Centers and Institutes =

Established in 1988, the Consortium of Humanities Centers and Institutes serves as a site for the discussion of issues germane to the fostering of cross-disciplinary activity and as a network for the circulation of information and the sharing of resources within the humanities and interpretive social sciences. CHCI has a membership of over 200 centers and institutes that are remarkably diverse in size and scope and are located in the United States, Australia, Canada, China, Korea, Finland, Taiwan, Ireland, United Kingdom, and other countries.

== Mission and History ==
Established in 1988, the Consortium of Humanities Centers and Institutes (CHCI) serves as an arena for the discussion of issues germane to cross-disciplinary activity in the humanities and as a network for the circulation of information and best practices related to the organizational and management dimensions of humanities centers and institutes. CHCI produces a major annual meeting of its membership, maintains a content-rich website, produces an annual print directory, and serves as a re-circulator for information about its members via listservs and its website. Members of the consortium also assist one another with ideas, evaluation, and other forms of service. The organization is headed by a president, and is governed by an international advisory board of member directors and other leaders in the humanities.

CHCI was established in 1988 as the product of two meetings: The Institutional Impact of Institutes at the University of California Humanities Research Institute (UCHRI, now based at the University of California, Irvine), convened by Murray Krieger, and an organizational meeting at the 1988 meeting of the American Council of Learned Societies (ACLS), convened by E. Ann Kaplan of the Humanities Institute at Stony Brook University. These gatherings were the first moments at which directors of humanities research organizations had come together to discuss issues of mutual concern, and the major product of the meetings was a unanimous sense that it was essential to establish a consortium to continue these dialogues. Ralph Cohen of the University of Virginia served from 1988 to 1995 as the organization's first chair, while CHCI administration was based at UCHRI. In its early years, the CHCI membership included over 70 members from the US and four other countries.

In 1995 CHCI operations and leadership moved to the Center for 21st Century Studies at the University of Wisconsin–Milwaukee, at that time directed by Kathleen Woodward, currently director of The Walter Chapin Simpson Center for the Humanities at the University of Washington. During CHCI's term at UW-Milwaukee, the membership grew to over 125 organizations as new centers were opened and existing members began to expand their programs and operations. This period of time also saw the dramatic expansion of CHCI's annual meetings, the development of the organization's first website, and two major grants from the Rockefeller Foundation for organizational development and network-building.

In 2001 CHCI moved to the auspices of the Humanities Center at Harvard, where Director Marjorie Garber served a six-year term as President of CHCI. During Professor Garber's term, membership continued to grow, and CHCI's annual meetings grew markedly in terms of depth, scale and impact.

In 2007, CHCI operations moved to the John Hope Franklin Humanities Institute at Duke University, under the leadership of ex-CHCI President Srinivas Aravamudan. At Duke, CHCI began developing new programs for membership, such as a partnership with the American Council of Learned Societies.

In 2016, CHCI moved from Duke University to the Center for the Humanities at the University of Wisconsin-Madison, where Professor Sara Guyer took over as president. In December of the same year, The Andrew W. Mellon Foundation announced their decision to fund two new CHCI initiatives: The CHCI Global Humanities Institutes and The CHCI Africa Initiative. On January 5, 2018 it was announced that CHCI would serve as a host organization for the American Council of Learned Societies's Public Fellows program.

CHCI is an affiliate member of the American Council of Learned Societies. The organization has put out statements affirming its support of federal funding for the humanities in general and for the National Endowment for the Humanities in particular.

== Annual meetings ==
Each CHCI annual meeting is each constructed around a broadly defined intellectual theme, and is hosted by a member center or institute.

== International advisory board ==
- Sara Guyer, president of the consortium; director, Center for the Humanities, University of Wisconsin–Madison
- Jean Allman, director, Center for the Humanities, Washington University in St. Louis
- Amanda Anderson, director, Cogut Center for the Humanities, Brown University
- Ian Baucom, director, John Hope Franklin Humanities Institute, Duke University
- Homi K. Bhabha, director, Mahindra Humanities Center, Harvard University
- Rosi Braidotti, director, Centre for the Humanities, Utrecht University
- Judith Buchanan, director, Humanities Research Centre, University of York
- Alan K. Chan, Dean, College of Humanities, Arts and Social Sciences, Nanyang Technological University
- James Chandler, director, Franke Institute for the Humanities, University of Chicago
- Javier Durán, director, Confluencenter for Creative Inquiry, University of Arizona
- Debjani Ganguly, director, Institute of the Humanities and Global Cultures, University of Virginia
- Elizabeth Giorgis, director, Modern Art Museum: Gebre Kristos Desta Center, Addis Ababa University
- Simon Goldhill, director, Centre for Research in the Arts, Social Sciences and Humanities (CRASSH), University of Cambridge
- Hsiung Ping-ChenSimon Goldhill, director, Research Institute for the Humanities, The Chinese University of Hong Kong
- Ranjana Khanna, director, Franklin Humanities Institute, Duke University
- Premesh Lalu, director, Centre of Humanities Research, University of the Western Cape
- Jie-Hyun Lim, director, Critical Global Studies Institute, Sogang University
- Joyce C.H. Liu, director, International Institute for Cultural Studies, National Chiao Tiung University
- Lydia Liu, director, Institute for Comparative Literature and Society, Columbia University
- Helmut Muller-Sievers, director, Center for the Humanities and the Arts, University of Colorado at Boulder
- Kerill O'Neill, director, Center for the Arts and Humanities, Colby College
- Juan Obarrio, director, Programa Sur Global, Universidad de San Martin; Johns Hopkins University
- Jane Ohlmeyer, director, Trinity Long Room Hub, Trinity College, Dublin
- Robert Phiddian, founding director, Flinders Institute for Research in the Humanities, Flinders University
- Shalini Randeria, Rector, Institute for Human Sciences (IWM);, director, Albert Hirschman Center on Democracy, Graduate Institute of International and Development Studies
- Gary Tomlinson, director, Whitney Humanities Center, Yale University
- Bin Wong, director, UCLA Asia Institute, University of California at Los Angeles
- Kathleen Woodward, director, [http://depts.washington.edu/uwch/ Walter Chapin Simpson Center for the Humanities, University of Washington, Seattle
