= Srinivas Aravamudan =

Srinivas Aravamudan (1962 – April 13, 2016) was an Indian-born American academic. He was a professor of English, Literature, and Romance Studies at Duke University, where he also served as dean of the humanities. He was widely recognized for his work on eighteenth-century British and French literature and postcolonial literature and theory. His publications included books and articles on novels, slavery, abolition, secularism, cosmopolitanism, globalization, climate change, and the anthropocene.

== Biography ==
Aravamudan was born in 1962 in Madras and attended Loyola College, University of Madras. He held master's degrees from Purdue University and Cornell University and earned his PhD at Cornell. He taught at the University of Utah and the University of Washington before joining Duke's faculty in 2000. He was awarded an honorary degree by Middlebury College in April 2016.

== Academic career ==
In 2000, Aravamudan received the Modern Language Association's prestigious prize for an outstanding first book for the publication of Tropicopolitans: Colonialism and Agency, 1688–1804 (Duke University Press, 1999). The work was particularly acclaimed for its inventive readings of eighteenth-century works of literature in light of postcolonial theories and concerns. Aravamudan's second book, Guru English: South Asian Religion in a Cosmopolitan Language (Princeton University Press, 2005; Penguin India, 2007), was similarly recognized for its expansive treatment of topics ranging from Romantic orientalism to Deepak Chopra, as well as for its tracing of the complex circuits via which knowledge about South Asian religion was produced. In his third book, Enlightenment Orientalism: Resisting the Rise of the Novel (Chicago University Press, 2012), Aravamudan considered manifestations of orientalism during the eighteenth century. Aravamudan further challenged literary critics to move beyond the Anglocentrism of typical histories of the novel by uncovering a significant body of British and French orientalist texts and their borrowings from Persian, Turkish, Arabic, Pali, and Sanskrit sources. For Enlightenment Orientalism, Aravamudan received a CHOICE Outstanding Academic Title Award, the Barbara Perkins and George Perkins Prize for the most significant contribution to the study of narrative from the International Society for the Study of Narrative, and the Oscar Kenshur Prize for the best book in eighteenth-century studies from Indiana University's Center for Eighteenth-Century Studies.

In addition to publishing the above books, Aravamudan edited a volume for the Pickering & Chatto series on Slavery, Abolition, and Emancipation: Writings in the British Romantic Period (1999). He also published an edition of William Earle's Obi; or, The History of Three-Fingered Jack (Broadview, 2005), a novel from 1800 about the legend of Jack Mansong, an escaped slave in late eighteenth-century Jamaica.

Aravamudan made significant contributions to the study of literature and the humanities at an institutional level as well. During his tenure at Duke, Aravamudan served as director of the Franklin Humanities Institute and dean of the humanities and oversaw such major projects as the Humanities Writ Large initiative. Aravamudan also served as president of the international Consortium of Humanities Centers and Institutes (2007–2012, 2014–2016) and president of the American Society for Eighteenth-Century Studies (2015–2016).

== Death ==
He died on April 13, 2016.

== Representative publications ==
- Enlightenment Orientalism: Resisting the Rise of the Novel (University of Chicago Press: 2012)
- Guru English: South Asian Religion in a Cosmopolitan Language (Princeton UP: 2006)
- Tropicopolitans: Colonialism and Agency, 1688–1804 (Duke UP: 1999)
- Obi, or the History of Three-Fingered Jack (Broadview: 2005) ed. Aravamudan
- Special issue of PMLA on "War," ed. Aravamudan
- "The Character of the University," Boundary 2 37.1 (Winter 2010) 23–55
- "What Kind of a Story Is This?," PMLA Approaches to Teaching Oroonoko (2010)
- "The Adventure Chronotope and the Oriental Xenotrope: Galland, Sheridan, and Joyce Domesticate The Arabian Nights," in The Arabian Nights After Three Hundred Years, ed. Felicity Nussbaum and Saree Makdisi (2008)
- "Defoe, Commerce, Adventure, and Empire," in Cambridge Companion to Daniel Defoe, ed. John Richetti (2008)
- "The Teleopoiesis of Singularity," PMLA 123.1 (January 2008)
- (with Ranjana Khanna and Fredric Jameson) "Final Interview," in Jameson on Jameson, ed. Ian Buchanan (2007)
- "Orientalism," in The Oxford Encyclopaedia of British Literature, ed. David Scott Kastan and Nancy Armstrong (2007)
- "Subjects/Sovereigns/Rogues," Eighteenth-Century Studies 40.3 (Spring, 2007) 457–65
- "Sovereignty: Between Embodiment and Detranscendentalization," Texas International Law Journal 41.3 (Summer, 2006) 427-46
- "In the Wake of the Novel: The Oriental Tale as National Allegory," Novel: A Forum on Fiction 33.1 (1999) 5–31
- "Trop(icaliz)ing the Enlightenment: Raynal's Histoire des deux Indes," Diacritics 23.3 (Fall, 1993) 48–68
