= Susanne Scholl =

Austrian journalist

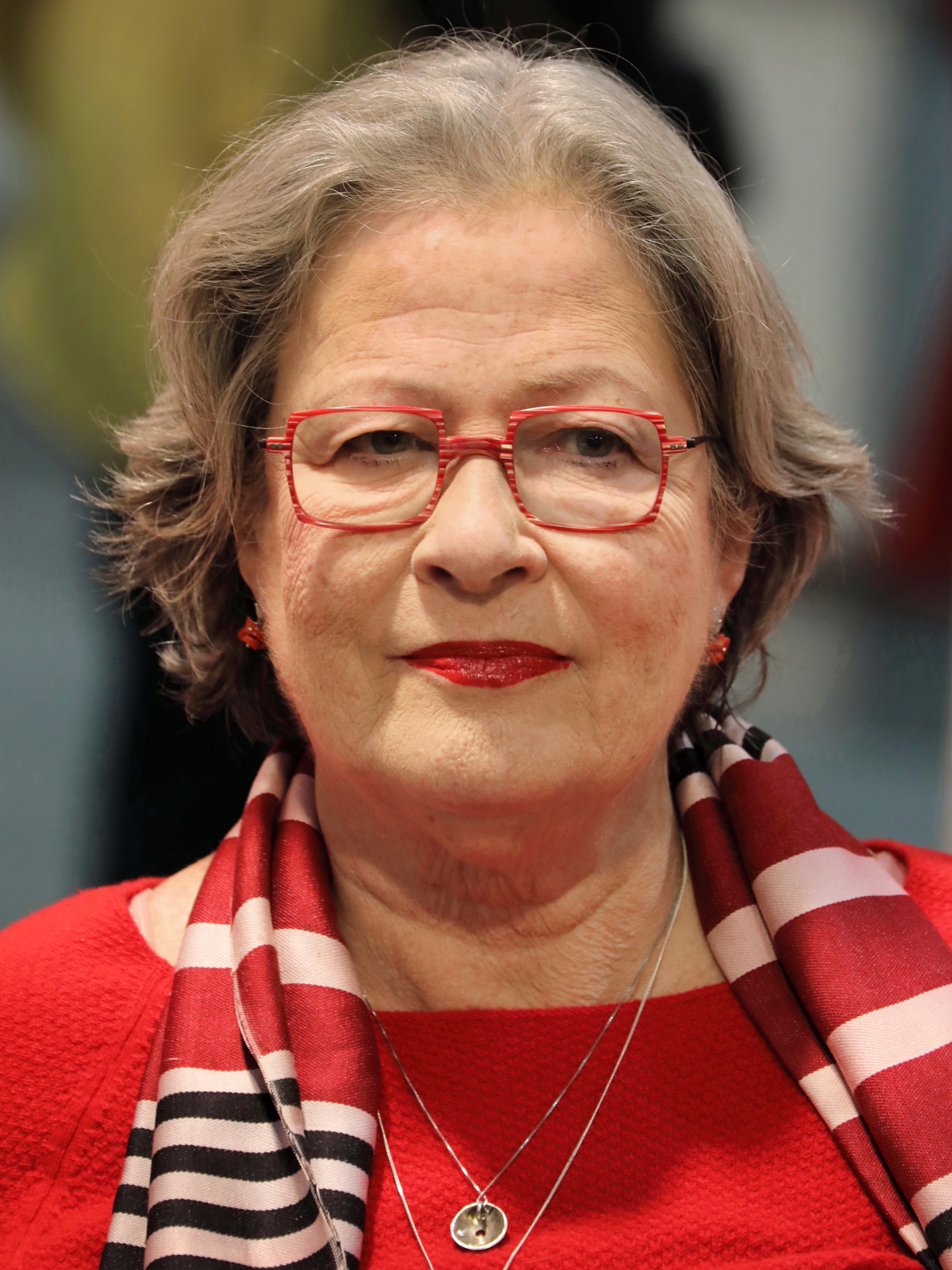
- Susanne Scholl in 2019
- Born: 19 September 1949 (age 77); Vienna, Austria
- Occupations: Journalist; Writer
- Organizations: ORF; Omas gegen Rechts

Susanne Scholl (born 19 September 1949) is an Austrian journalist, writer and doyenne of the foreign correspondents of the ORF.

== Life and career ==
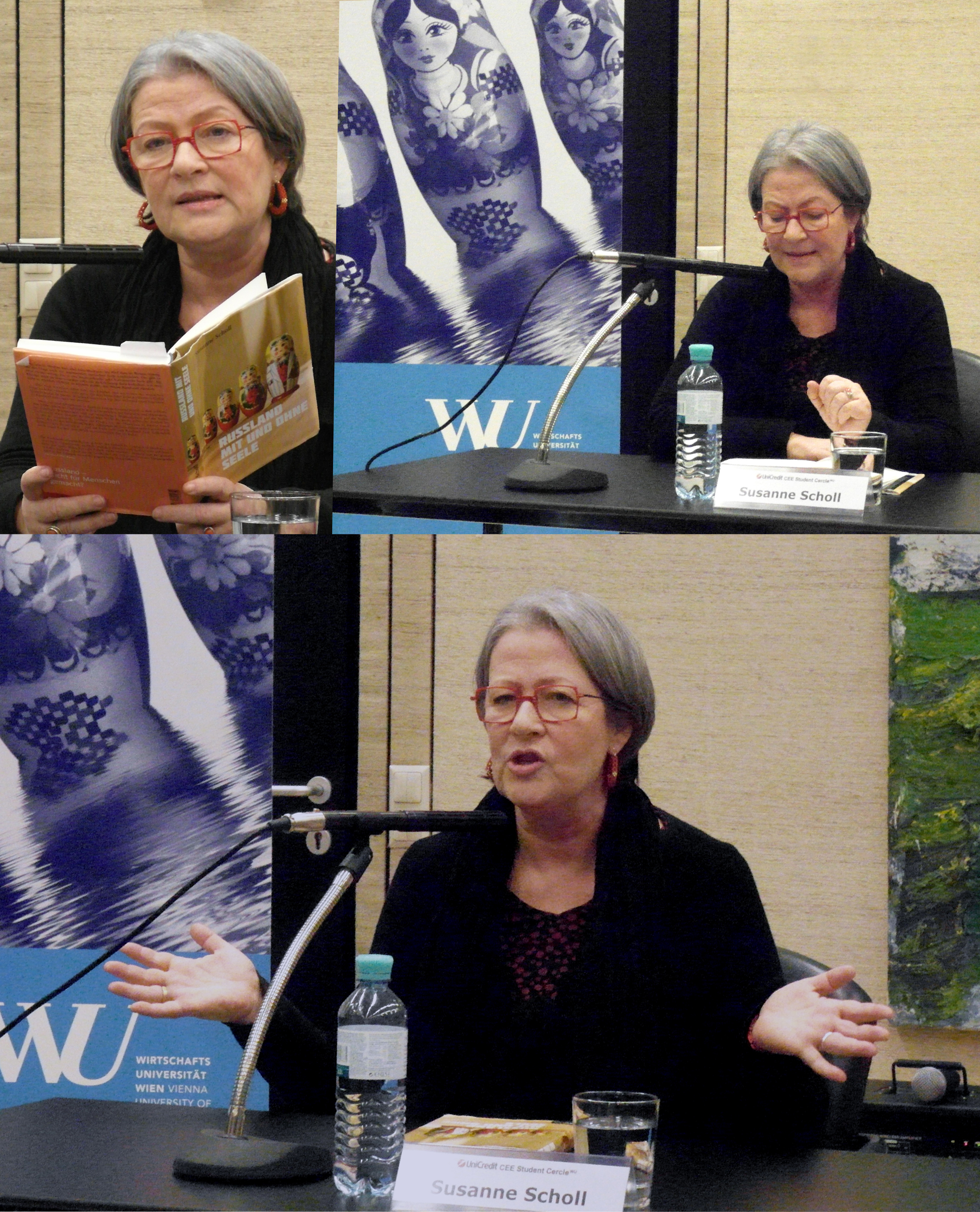
Susanne Scholl, Vienna 2011.

Born in Vienna, Scholl is the daughter of an assimilated Austrian-Jewish medical family, whose tragic fate she dealt with in her novel Elsa's Grandfathers. Her father came from Pötzleinsdorf, her mother from Leopoldstadt. They had met at the "Austrian Center" in emigration in London, and returned to Vienna in 1947 to help rebuild communism in Austria.

Scholl embarked on her educational path with doctoral studies in Slavic Studies in Russia and Rome, which she completed in Rome in 1972. Journalistically, she worked for Radio Österreich International (ROI) and the Austria Press Agency, from where she was recruited by Paul Lendvai in 1986 to the pioneering team of the new ORF Eastern Europe editorial department.

In 1989 Scholl went to Bonn as a correspondent for the ORF, and in 1991 she moved to Moscow. From 1997 to 2000, she headed the Europajournal on ORF radio at the Vienna headquarters, before returning to Moscow. Her temporary arrest by the Russian authorities while reporting from Chechnya caused a sensation.

In 2012 Scholl wrote:

Wladimir Putin knows full well who he wants to be friends with. Berlusconi or Gerhard Schröder and Tony Blair, to name but a few.

Meanwhile the mother of a pair of twins (born in 1983) has emerged as a book author – Russian Diary, Moscow Kitchen Talks, Elsa's Grandfathers (novel), Natasha's Winter (stories), Journey to Karaganda (novel), Daughters of War – Survival in Chechnya, Red as Love (poems), Russia with and without a Soul, Russian Winter Journey (poems), Alone at Home, The Queen of Sheba (short story), Waking Dream (novel).

Susanne Scholl was among the first members of Omas gegen Rechts, the nonprofit founded in Austria by Monika Salzer.

The author Emil Scholl was her grandfather.

== Publications ==
- Russisches Tagebuch
- Moskauer Küchengespräche.
- Elsas Großväter (novel),
- Nataschas Winter (tales)
- Reise nach Karaganda (novel)
- Töchter des Krieges – Überleben in Tschetschenien
- Rot wie die Liebe (poems)
- Russland mit und ohne Seele
- Russische Winterreise (tales)
- Allein zu Hause
- Die Königin von Saba (tales)
- Emma schweigt. Residenz Verlag, 2014, ISBN 978-3-7017-1623-4.
- Warten auf Gianni (novel). Residenz Verlag, 2016, ISBN 978-3-7017-1667-8.
- Wachtraum (novel), Residenz Verlag, 2017, ISBN 978-3-7017-1681-4.
- Die Damen des Hauses, Residenz Verlag, 2019, ISBN 978-3-7017-1719-4.

== Awards ==
Scholl has been awarded the Austrian Decoration for Science and Art as well as numerous other prizes, such as the Axel Corti Prize of the Austrian National Education in 2007 and the Concordia Prize of the Presseclub Concordia. In 2009 she was Journalist of the Year in the category Foreign Policy. In 2012, she was awarded the Buchliebling Lifetime Award. In November 2012, she received the Ehrenzeichen für Verdienste um das Land Wien and on 29 October 2020 the Ferdinand Berger Prize by the Austrian Documentation Archive at Vienna City Hall. In 2021, she was awarded the Prize of the City of Vienna for Journalism.
