= Franke Institute for the Humanities =

US research institute

Coordinates: 41.792001°N 87.599686°W

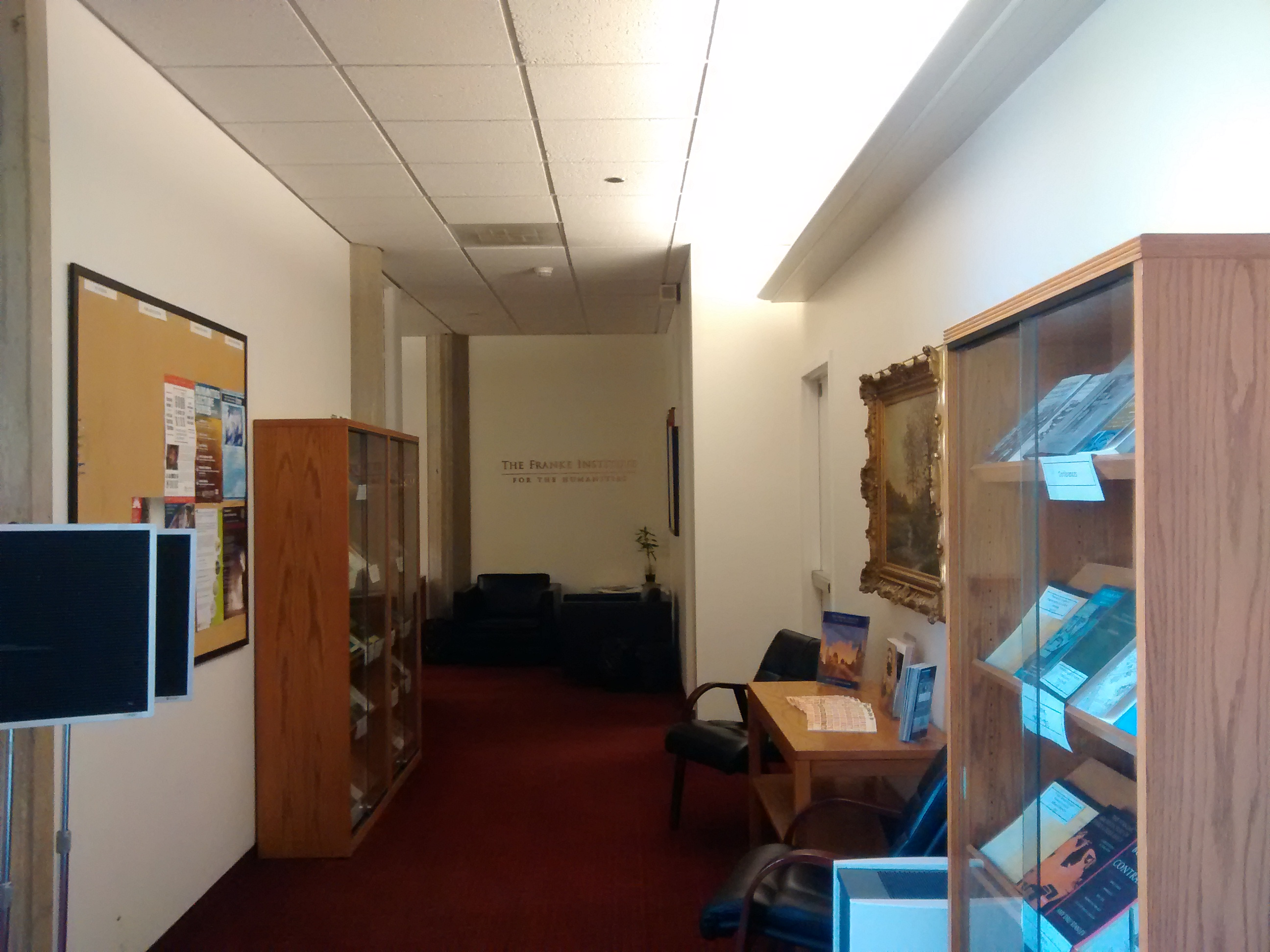
Franke Institute for the Humanities

The Franke Institute for the Humanities is located in Regenstein Library at the University of Chicago. It promotes sharp, rigorous scholarship in the humanities and social sciences by sponsoring research fellows, organizing talks, workshops, and conferences, and attracting participants from the university, the city of Chicago, and a global community of artists, academics, and other interested audiences.

The institute is named for Barbara E. and Richard J. Franke, who have supported it financially since its founding in 1990.

The current director is Professor James Chandler.

The Franke Institute for the Humanities is a member of the Consortium of Humanities Centers and Institutes (CHCI).
