= Monika Salzer =

Austrian psychotherapist and pastor

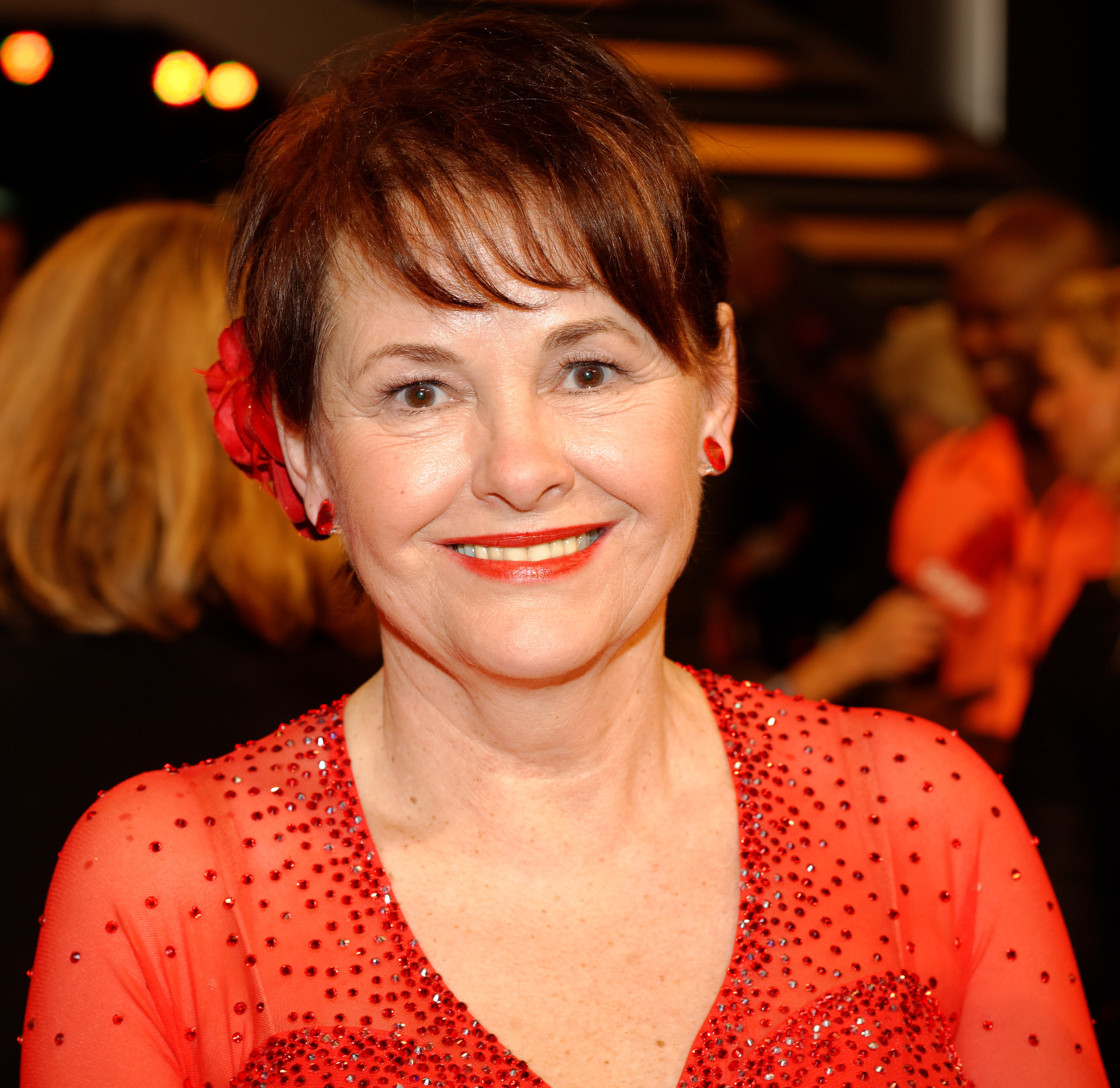
- Monika Salzer in 2013
- Born: 11 February 1948 (age 77); Vienna, Austria
- Education: University of Vienna; Institut für Systematische Therapie
- Occupations: Theologian; Pastor; Psychotherapist
- Organizations: Orthopädisches Krankenhaus Gersthof; Protestant Diocese of Vienna; Kronen Zeitung; Omas gegen Rechts

Monika Salzer (born 11 February 1948) is an Austrian psychotherapist, Protestant theologian and pastor, columnist, and author. She worked in hospitals handling clinical pastoral care for the seriously ill, including the education of voluntary caretakers. Later, she had a private practice as a systematic psychotherapist, helped to restructure the organisation of the Protestant Church of the Augsburg Confession in Austria, was a columnist for the Kronen Zeitung, and co-founded the protest initiative Omas gegen Rechts (Grannies against the Right).

== Life and career ==
Salzer was born in Vienna into a multi-cultural family. After the Matura, she was trained to be a laboratory assistant at the Vienna General Hospital, completing a diploma. She then studied psychology at the University of Vienna from 1968 to 1970. She studied Protestant theology from 1977 to 1983.

From 1983 to 1985, Salzer worked in a research project at the Orthopädisches Krankenhaus Gersthof, and wrote its report, Klinische Seelsorge an schwersterkrankten Jugendlichen und jungen Erwachsenen (Clinical pastoral care for seriously ill adolescents and young adults), about taking spiritual care of young people treated for serious illnesses.

Salzer was ordained as a pastor in 1989, and worked for ten years at the Kaiser-Franz-Josef-Spital in Vienna, becoming engaged in the education of voluntary pastoral caretakers (Seelsorger). She founded church services for bereaved people (Gottesdienst für Trauernde) at the Lutheran City Church, and an association called Zentrum für Seelsorge und Kommunikation (SeKo) of the Protestant Church of the Augsburg Confession which became a registered association (eingetragener Verein) in 1994), which offered courses in death and grief counselling for more than 13 years.

Salzer studied at the Institut für Systematische Therapie (IFS) to become a systematic psychotherapist. She then opened her own office. She received further education in the systematic development of organisations (Systemische Organisationsentwicklung) at the Faculty for Interdisciplinary Research and Continuing Education of the University of Klagenfurt, completing as a Master of Advanced Studies. From 2000 to 2004, she initiated and developed a process of developing the organisation of the Protestant Church of the Augsburg Confession, together with Michael Bünker, then director of the Religionspädagogische Akademie, and Thomas Krobath from the Kirchliche Pädagogische Hochschule Wien/Krems.

From 2006, Salzer wrote, alternating with Ingrid Bachler and Ingrid Tschank, a column "Im Gespräch" (In conversation) in the Sunday edition Krone Bunt of the Kronen Zeitung.

In 2017, Salzer was a founding member of the initiative Omas gegen Rechts together with Susanne Scholl. It was registered as an association in May 2018.

=== Personal life ===
Monika Salzer is married to Martin Salzer, a physician and specialist in bone tumors and founder of Austrian Doctors for Disabled and Doctors for Disabled International. They have two children and the couple live in Eichgraben, Lower Austria.

In 2013, Salzer took part in the eighth season of the Austrian TV dance show Dancing Stars and achieved eighth place with her dance partner Florian Gschaider.

== Publications ==
- Monika Salzer; Joachim Gubba, eds. (1996), Zwischen den Welten. Medizin im Dialog. Festschrift für Martin Salzer (in German), Wien: Rebell, ISBN 978-3-9500516-0-5
- Monika Salzer; Peter Karner [in German] (2008), Vom Christbaum zur Ringstraße. Evangelisches Wien (in German), Wien: Picus, ISBN 978-3-85452-636-0
- Monika Salzer (2019), Omas gegen Rechts. Warum wir für die Zukunft unserer Enkel kämpfen (in German), München: Droemer-Knaur, ISBN 978-3-426-27811-6
