= Franklin Humanities Institute =

Interdisciplinary humanities center at Duke University, United States

Coordinates: 36.002119°N 78.914857°W

The Franklin Humanities Institute (FHI) is an interdisciplinary humanities center at Duke University dedicated to supporting humanities, arts, and social science research and teaching. Named after the prominent African American historian and civil rights activist John Hope Franklin, who retired from Duke in 1985 as the James B. Duke professor of history, the institute has also made a commitment to promote scholarship that enhances social equity, especially through research on race and ethnicity.

The Franklin Humanities Institute is part of a consortium of interdisciplinary research centers and institutes at Duke University. It was formerly located at the John Hope Franklin Center for Interdisciplinary and International Studies at Duke, and is now located in the historic Smith Warehouse on Duke's East Campus.

== History ==
The Franklin Humanities Institute was founded in 1999 by Cathy Davidson, then Vice Provost for interdisciplinary Studies, and Karla F.C. Holloway, former Dean of the Humanities and Social Sciences. In 2002, the institute received a three-year grant from the Andrew W. Mellon Foundation for a project entitled "Making the Humanities Central." The grant was renewed for a second three-year cycle in 2005.

In Spring 2007, the FHI became the new administrative headquarters of the Consortium of Humanities Centers and Institutes (CHCI), an international organization that supports interdisciplinary humanities scholarship and institution-building. Prior to moving to Duke, the CHCI was based at Harvard University.

Srinivas Aravamudan was the director of the FHI before he took the position as Dean of Humanities at Duke University in 2009. Ian Baucom was the director of the FHI before he took the position of Buckner W. Clay Dean of Arts and Sciences at the University of Virginia in 2014. David Bell served as the interim director of the FHI in 2014–15.

In Fall 2010 the FHI moved to the renovated Smith Warehouse on Duke's East Campus, near the heart of Durham's historic Downtown district. The Warehouse is home to the Humanities Laboratories initiative, which aims to contribute to Duke's research and pedagogical missions by convening groups of faculty, graduate students, and undergraduates around discipline-crossing projects, in spaces designed specifically to facilitate collaborative work. Complementing historic strengths in supporting faculty and graduate scholarship (notably through the twelve Annual Seminars they hosted between 1999 and 2011), the Labs invite undergraduates to participate as researchers themselves, helping to define emerging and future areas of humanistic inquiry. Since 2011–12, the Lab initiative became a key element of Humanities Writ Large, a major university-wide Mellon Foundation grant. In 2012-13 the undergraduate-focused Labs were joined by the PhD Lab in Digital Knowledge.

In 2014-15 the FHI inaugurates the Seminars in Historical, Global, and Emerging Humanities, a major new initiative funded by the Mellon Foundation. The grant explores the states and directions of humanities disciplines in light of the interdisciplinary developments in recent decades, through an expansive set of partnerships with Duke's humanities and interpretive social sciences departments and non-departmental units.

== Programs ==
The Franklin Humanities Institute sponsors an annual residential seminar consisting of Duke faculty, graduate research fellows, a post-doctoral fellow, and professional staff at the university (e.g. librarians, IT specialist). Conceived as a "laboratory" for humanists from diverse disciplines, each annual seminar focuses on a theme or problem with broad historical, philosophical, or geographical scope. To date, there have been seminars organized around two general areas: "Race" (1999–2003) and "Art, Ideas, and Information" (2004–08). The 2007-08 seminar, Recycle, explored the appropriation of cultural products in different contexts. This seminar was co-convened by Neil De Marchi (Professor of Economics), Mark Anthony Neal (Associate Professor or African and African American Studies), and Annabel J. Wharton (William B. Hamilton Professor of Art, Art History and Visual Studies).

In 2011 The Franklin Humanities Institute began sponsoring Interdisciplinary Humanities Labs, with later support from the Mellon Foundation's Humanities Writ Large grant. These limited-term labs include dedicated space in the historic Smith Warehouse home of the FHI, and are organized around a research area and specific projects and promote vertical integration among undergraduates, graduates, and faculty. These have included the Haiti Lab, the GreaterThanGames: Transmedia Applications, Virtual Worlds, and Digital Storytelling Lab, the BorderWorks Lab, the Global Brazil Lab, the AudioVisualities Lab, and the PhD Lab in Digital Knowledge.

In addition to the Annual Seminar, the Franklin Humanities Institute also runs a dissertation working group for graduate students. FHI also includes other long-standing "signature" programs, including the Faculty Book Manuscript Workshops. The Annual Lecture and Short-term Residencies bring world-renowned scholars to Duke for public engagements with the university community. The Faculty Bookwatch series, presented in conjunction with the Duke University Libraries, highlights notable recent books by faculty in the humanities and interpretive social sciences.

The FHI's public programs have also included Wednesdays at the Center, a popular lunchtime conversation series open to the general public. Since 2002, series speakers have included the Harvard historian Evelyn Brooks Higginbotham, the Ciompi Quartet violinist Hsiao-mei Ku, Radio France Internationale Correspondent Dominique Roch, the writer and human rights activist Ariel Dorfman, as well as John Hope Franklin himself.

The Mellon Annual Distinguished Lecture in Humanities has featured well-known scholars from many fields and from across the globe, including the philosopher Kwame Anthony Appiah, the British filmmaker Isaac Julien, the Dutch cultural theorist and video artist Mieke Bal, the Indian historian Romila Thapar, and the US literary critic Emory Elliott.

== Technology Initiatives ==
In 2006, Duke joined five other American universities - Brown, Stanford, the University of Michigan, the Missouri School of Journalism, and the University of Wisconsin-Madison - in a venture with Apple Computer to test iTunes U, a web-based tool designed for faculty and students to share digital content, such as audio, video and images. As one of the participants on the Duke iTunes U project, the Franklin Humanities Institute has made a number of its public events available for download as video and audio podcasts.

Many of the FHI Humanities Labs have included substantial digital dimensions in their research outputs as well. These have included collaboratively-produced websites, art installations, mobile applications, online maps, and games.
