= Ranjana Khanna =

American philosopher

Academic background
- Education: University of York

Academic work
- Institutions: Duke University
- Main interests: Literary critic and literary theory

Ranjana Khanna is a literary critic and theorist recognized for her interdisciplinary, feminist and internationalist contributions to the fields of post-colonial studies, feminist theory, literature and political philosophy. She is best known for her work on melancholia and psychoanalysis, but has also published extensively on questions of post-colonial agency, film, Algeria, area studies, autobiography, Marxism, the visual and feminist theory. She received her Ph.D. in 1993 from the University of York. She has taught at the University of Washington in Seattle and at the University of Utah, and in 2000 began teaching at Duke University, where she is Professor of English, Literature and Women's Studies. Her theorization of subjectivity and sovereignty, including her recent work on disposability, indignity and asylum, engages with the work of diverse thinkers such as Derrida, Irigaray, Kant, Marx, Heidegger, de Beauvoir, and Spivak. From 2007 until 2015, she was the Margaret Taylor Smith Director of Women's Studies, and in July 2017, she was appointed to be the incoming director of the John Hope Franklin Humanities Institute, both at Duke University.

== Publications ==
=== Books ===
- Algeria Cuts: Women and Representation, 1830 to the Present. Stanford University Press. 2007.
- Dark Continents: Psychoanalysis and Colonialism. Duke University Press. 2003.

=== Articles and book chapters ===
- "Speculation, or, Living in the Face of the Intolerable." In Journal of Middle East Women's Studies. (2018). 14:1.
- "Stranger." In New Literary History. (2018). 49:2.
- "On the Name, Ideation, and Sexual Difference." In differences: A Journal of Feminist Cultural Studies. (2016). 27:2.
- "On the Right to Sleep, Perchance to Dream." In A Concise Companion to Psychoanalysis, Literature, and Culture. Eds. Laura Marcus and Ankhi Mukherjee. (2014): 351-366.
- "To the Lighthouse: Zineb Sedira & Ranjana Khanna in Conversation." Amy Powell, Zineb Sedira & Ranjana Khanna. Gulf Coast. (2014) 26.2 Summer/Fall.
- "Rex, or the Negation of Wandering." In Deconstructing Zionism. Eds. Gianni Vattimo and Michael Marder. (2013): 133-147.
- "The Lumpenproletariat, the Subaltern, the Mental Asylum." South Atlantic Quarterly. (2013) 112:1.
- "Touching, Unbelonging, and the Absence of Affect." Feminist Theory (2012) 13:2.
- "Hope, Demand, and the Perpetual." In Unconscious Dominions. Eds. Warwick Anderson, Deborah Jenson, and Richard C. Keller. (2011): 247-264.
- "Racial France, or the Melancholic Alterity of Postcolonial Studies." Public Culture (2011).
- "Unbelonging: In Motion." Differences (2010).
- "Technologies of Belonging: Sensus Communis, Disidentification." Communities of Sense (2009).
- "Disposability." Differences. (2009).
- "Indignity." Positions 16:1 (2008).
- "Fabric, Skin, Honte-ologie." Shame and the Visual Arts (2008).
- "From Rue Morgue to Rue des Iris." Screen 48:2 (2007): 237-44.
- Khanna, Ranjana (2007). "Indignity". Ethnic and Racial Studies. 30 (2): 257–280. doi:10.1080/01419870601143943. S2CID 217507785.
- R. Khanna and Srinivas Aravamudan. "Interview with Fredric Jameson." ed. Ian Buchanan, Fredric Jameson, Jameson on Jameson: Conversations on Cultural Marxism (2007): 203-240.
- "Post-Palliative." Postcolonial Text 2:1 (2006).
- "Asylum." Texas International Law Journal 41:3 (2006): 471-90.
- "Frames, Contexts, Community, Justice." Summer 2003. However, the issue appeared in November 2005. Diacritics 33:2 (2005): 11-41.
- "On Asylum." SAQ (2005).
- R. Khanna. "Signatures of the Impossible." Duke Journal of Law and Gender Policy (2004).
- "Latent Ghosts and the Manifesto." Art History: Journal of the Association of Art Historians 26:2 (April, 2003): 244-286.
- "Baya (translation)." Art History: Journal of the Association of Art Historians 26:2 (April, 2003): 287.
- "Le Combat de Baya (translation)." Art History: Journal of the Association of Art Historians 26:2 (April, 2003): 288-289.
- Khanna, Ranjana (2002). "Frames, Contexts, Community, Justice". In Joyce Goggin; Michael Burke (eds.). Meaning, Frame, and Metaphor. ASCA-Press. pp. 149–171.
- "Taking a Stand for Afghanistan." Signs 28:1 (Fall, 2002): 464-5.
- with R. Khanna, Barbara Burton, Nouray Ibryamova, Dyan Ellen Mazurana, and S. Lily Mendoza. "Cartographies of Scholarship: The Ends of Nation-States, International Studies, and the Cold War." Encompassing Gender: Integrating International Studies and Women's Studies (2002): 21-45.
- "The Experience of Evidence: Language, Law and the Mockery of Justice." Algeria in and Out of French (January, Jan. 2001).
- "The Ambiguity of Ethics: Specters of Colonialism." Feminist Consequences: Theory for the New Century (January, 2001).
- "Cartographies of Scholarship." With Mendoza, Mazurana, Burton and Ibryamova Area & International Studies Curriculum: Integration Book (January, 2000).
- "From Third to Fourth Cinema." Third Text (1998): 13-32.
- "'Araby' (Dubliners): Women's Time and the Time of the Nation." Refereed Joyce, Feminism, Colonialism/Postcolonialism/European Joyce Studies (1998): 81-101.
- "The Construction of the Dark Continent: Agency as Autobiography." Women's Lives/Women's Times (December, Dec. 1997): 103-20.
- with R. Khanna and Karen Engle. "Forgotten History: Myth, Empathy, and Assimilated Culture." Feminism and the New Democracy (1997): 67-80.
- "Feminism and Psychoanalysis: Repetition, Repression and the Unconscious." New Directions in Cognitive Science (1995): 358-67.

=== Other ===
- Interview, "Asylum, Melancholia and Psychoanalysis" - 'Hawke Talks' Episode 04, 2013. https://web.archive.org/web/20150409054806/http://www.you/ tube.com/watch?v=1rEAszWlAuU
- Radio Interview, "On Asylum and the Right to Sleep," on "The Wire Community Radio." 27 June 2013. http://www.thewire.org.au/storyDetail.aspx?ID=10521
- Ranjana Khanna discusses the national poster campaign Who Needs Feminism on WUNC radio, May 10, 2012.
- November DukeReads with Ranjana Khanna. The White Tiger, by Aravind Adiga, presented by Ranjana Khanna. November 11, 2009.
- R. Khanna. "Participant in MLA Radio Program "What's the Word?" on Gillo Pontecorvo's Battle of Algiers." 2006.
- R. Khanna. ""From Exile to Asylum" Audio section of Bloomsday 100 created by The James Joyce Center, Bloomsday 100, and Hyperfecto CD-Rom 2005." . 2005.
- R.Khanna. "Review of Emily Apter's Continental Drift: From National Characteristics to Virtual Subjects". (U of Chicago P 1999), MLQ 61:4 (December, Dec. 2000): 692-695.
- R.Khanna. "Review of Female Subjects in Black and White: Race, Psychoanalysis, Feminism". Signs 26:1 (Fall, 2000): 262-5.
