= Simon Goldhill =

British classicist (born 1957)

Simon Goldhill FBA
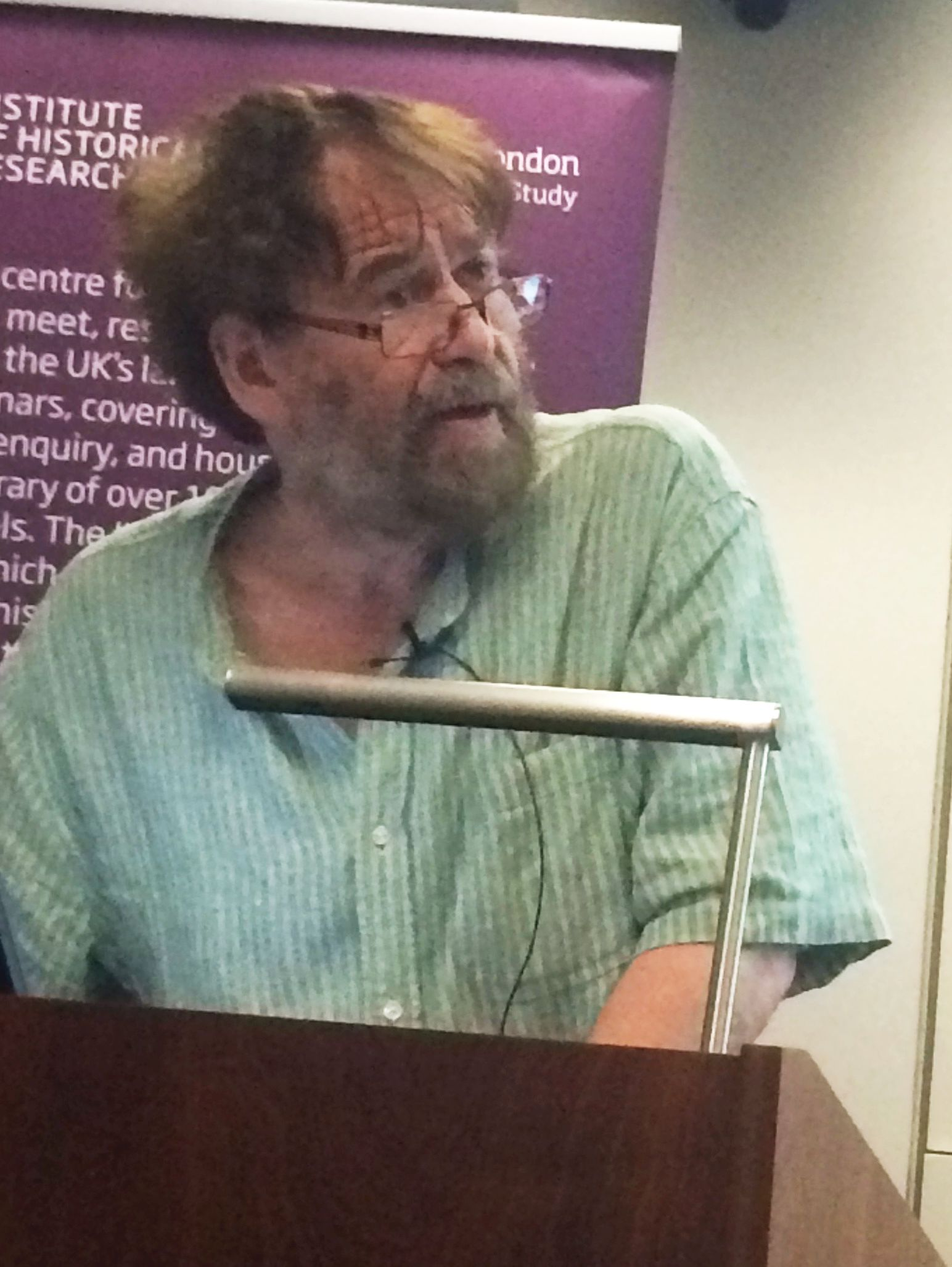
- Goldhill in 2016
- Born: Simon David Goldhill; 17 March 1957 (age 69)

Academic background
- Education: King's College, Cambridge
- Thesis: Language, Sexuality, Narrative: the Oresteia (1982)
- Doctoral advisor: P. E. Easterling
- Influences: Froma Zeitlin; J. G. W. Henderson; G. E. R. Lloyd; Charles Segal; Pierre Vidal-Naquet

Academic work
- Discipline: Classics
- Sub-discipline: Ancient Greek literature
- Institutions: King's College, Cambridge

Simon David Goldhill FBA (born 17 March 1957) is a British classicist who was professor in Greek literature and culture and fellow and director of studies in classics at King's College, Cambridge. He was previously Director of Centre for Research in the Arts, Social Sciences, and Humanities (CRASSH) at the University of Cambridge, succeeding Mary Jacobus in October 2011. He is best known for his work on Greek tragedy.

Goldhill was educated at University College School in London and at King's College, Cambridge. In addition to his posts at Cambridge, he is a member of the Council of the Arts and Humanities Research Council, and has held several other academic, administrative and honorary positions. In June 2026, he resigned from Cambridge after accusations of sexual misconduct against him were upheld by the university.

== Biography ==
Goldhill's father, Michael Goldhill, was the managing director of a plastics manufacturer. Simon Goldhill was educated at University College School in Hampstead, London, and King's College, Cambridge, where he graduated with a first-class honours degree in 1978 and a PhD in 1982. While at Cambridge he was awarded the university's prestigious Chancellor's Medal for poetry.

In 2009, Goldhill was elected a fellow of the American Academy of Arts and Sciences. In 2010, he was appointed as the John Harvard Professor in Humanities and Social Sciences at Cambridge, a research position held concurrently with his chair in Greek. In 2016, he became a fellow of the British Academy. He is a member of the Council of the Arts and Humanities Research Council, the Board of the Consortium of Humanities Centers and Institutes, and is President of the European Institutes for Advanced Study (NetIAS).

In April 2026, it was reported that Cambridge University had recently upheld complaints of professional and sexual misconduct against him. According to an investigation commissioned by the university from an external consultancy, Goldhill gave a female student an unwanted kiss, stroked her body and put his tongue in her ear. Further allegations of a similar kind by two more women, denied by Goldhill, subsequently surfaced. In June 2026, Goldhill resigned from his university posts at Cambridge; he had previously been due to retire at the end of that year.

== Research ==
Goldhill's research interests include Greek tragedy, Greek culture, literary theory, later Greek literature, and Classical reception studies. His latest books include Victorian Culture and Classical Antiquity: Art, Opera, Fiction and the Proclamation of Modernity (2011), based on his Martin Lectures at Oberlin College in 2010, and Sophocles and the Language of Tragedy (2012), based on his Onassis Lectures, delivered across America in 2011.

Goldhill's Victorian Culture and Classical Antiquity won the 2012 Robert Lowry Patten Award for "the best recent study in nineteenth-century British literary studies or the best recent study in British literary studies of the Restoration and Eighteenth Century" published between 2010 and 2012. Sophocles and the Language of Tragedy won the 2013 Runciman Award for the best book on a Greek topic, ancient or modern. Jerusalem, City of Longing won the Independent Publishers Gold medal for History in 2010.

Goldhill was the Principal Investigator for a project on The Bible and Antiquity in 19th-Century Culture, funded by the European Research Council and based at CRASSH, in collaboration with the Cambridge Classics Faculty. The team consisted of six postdoctoral fellows and the following directors of the project:

- Professor Simon Goldhill, Professor of Greek, Director of CRASSH (PI)
- Professor James Secord, Professor of History of Science, Director Darwin Project
- Professor Janet Soskice, Faculty of Divinity
- Scott Mandelbrote, Faculty of History
- Dr Michael Ledger-Lomas, Faculty of History
- Dr Jeremy Morris, King's College, Cambridge.

== Books ==
- Queer Cambridge: An Alternative History, Cambridge University Press, 2025, ISBN 978-1009528061
- The Christian Invention of Time: Temporality and the Literature of Late Antiquity, Cambridge University Press, 2022, ISBN 978-1-316-51290-6
- Preposterous Poetics: The Politics and Aesthetics of Form in Late Antiquity, Cambridge University Press, 2020, ISBN 978-1-108-86002-4
- A Very Queer Family Indeed: Sex, Religion, and the Bensons in Victorian Britain, University of Chicago Press, 2016
- Sophocles and the Language of Tragedy, Oxford University Press, 2012, ISBN 978-0-199-79627-4
- Freud's Couch, Scott's Buttocks, Brontë's Grave, University of Chicago Press, 2011, ISBN 978-0-226-30131-0
- The End of Dialogue in Antiquity, Cambridge University Press, 2009, ISBN 978-0-521-88774-8 (editor)
- Jerusalem: City of Longing, Harvard University Press, 2008, ISBN 978-0-674-02866-1
- How to Stage Greek Tragedy Today, University of Chicago Press, 2007, ISBN 978-0-226-30128-0
- Being Greek Under Rome: Cultural Identity, the Second Sophistic and the Development of Empire, Cambridge University Press, 2007, ISBN 978-0-521-03087-8 (editor)
- Rethinking Revolutions through Ancient Greece, Cambridge University Press, 2006, ISBN 978-0-521-86212-7 (co-editor with Robin Osborne)
- The Temple of Jerusalem, Harvard University Press, 2005, ISBN 978-0-674-06189-7
- Love, Sex and Tragedy: How the Ancient World Shapes Our Lives, University of Chicago Press, 2004, ISBN 978-0-226-30117-4 Excerpt
- The Invention of Prose, Oxford University Press, 2002, ISBN 978-0-198-52523-3
- Who Needs Greek?: Contests in the Cultural History of Hellenism, Cambridge University Press, 2002, ISBN 978-0-521-81228-3
- Performance Culture and Athenian Democracy, Cambridge University Press, 1999, ISBN 978-0-521-64247-7 (co-editor with Robin Osborne)
- Foucault's Virginity: Ancient Erotic Fiction and the History of Sexuality, Cambridge University Press, 1995, ISBN 978-0-521-47372-9
- Art and Text in Greek Culture, Cambridge University Press, 1994, ISBN 978-0-521-41185-1 (co-editor with Robin Osborne)
- The Poet's Voice: Essays on Poetics and Greek Literature, Cambridge University Press, 1991, ISBN 978-0-521-39062-0
- Reading Greek Tragedy, Cambridge University Press, 1986, ISBN 978-0-521-31579-1
- Language, Sexuality, Narrative: The Oresteia, Cambridge University Press, 1985, ISBN 978-0-521-26535-5

== Personal life ==
Goldhill married Shoshana Rosenfeld, a Cambridge classics graduate, at the Fifth Avenue Synagogue in New York in 1983. They have one daughter.
