= Simpson Center for the Humanities =

Research center at the University of Washington

Coordinates: 47.6569°N 122.3055°W

The Walter Chapin Simpson Center for the Humanities, located in Seattle, Washington, is one of the largest and most comprehensive humanities centers in the United States. Housed in the College of Arts and Sciences at the University of Washington (UW), it offers UW scholars a spectrum of local opportunities for intellectual community and grant support that advances crossdisciplinarity, collaboration, and research while networking them nationally and internationally.

== History ==
In 1987, the UW's College of Arts and Sciences established the University of Washington Center for the Humanities with a mandate to support interdisciplinary activities. Ron Moore and Leroy Searle served as formative leaders of the center. In 1997, Barclay and Sharon Simpson endowed the center, which was renamed the Walter Chapin Simpson Center for the Humanities, in tribute to Barclay Simpson's father, a lifelong supporter of humanistic education. Kathleen Woodward was named Director of the Center in 2000; she continues to lead it today.

== Programs and Initiatives ==
=== Collaboration and Crossdisciplinarity ===
All Center programs are grounded in collaboration and crossdisciplinarity. The Center provides funding and support for fellowship programs, research clusters, graduate student interest groups, conferences, and symposia, allowing faculty and graduate students to exchange ideas and develop individual and collaborative projects together with other faculty, students, visiting scholars, and community practitioners.

Between 2000 and 2013, the Simpson Center funded 126 faculty fellowships and 51 dissertation fellowships supporting scholars from 30 campus units across the humanities, arts, social sciences, and professional schools.

The center also supports large-scale projects funded by major foundations and agencies. Recent examples include the American Music Partnership with KEXP-FM of Seattle (Paul G. Allen Family Foundation, 2009–2011), the Sawyer Seminar on Now Urbanism (Andrew W. Mellon Foundation, 2010–2012), and Biological Futures in a Globalized World (Fred Hutchinson Cancer Research Center, 2011–2012).

=== Public Scholarship ===
The Simpson Center has gained national recognition for its work advancing scholarship as a publicly engaged practice, a field often referred to as the public humanities. Undertaken with and for diverse communities, public scholarship promotes mutually-beneficial partnerships between higher education and organizations in the public and private sectors.

The Certificate in Public Scholarship is a portfolio- and project-based program that enables graduate students and faculty mentors to integrate their scholarly, social, and political commitments in the context of their intellectual and professional development.

Center grants support humanities-based research, teaching, and engagement projects that encourage dialogue, exchange, and collaboration among UW scholars and community members.

The center hosts the Solomon Katz Distinguished Lectures in the Humanities, which feature leading thinkers such as Dipesh Chakrabarty, Robin Kelley, Wendy Brown, Anne Balsamo, and Cathy Davidson in events that are free and open to the public.

=== Digital Humanities ===
In 2008, the Simpson Center received a $625,000 Challenge Grant by the National Endowment for the Humanities (NEH), an endorsement for its plans to raise funds to establish the Digital Humanities Commons, a fellowship program that will support inventive and experimental research inspired by new and emerging technologies in the digital humanities. In 2010, the Andrew W. Mellon Foundation gave $600,000 to underwrite the Digital Humanities Commons fund-raising efforts. The fundraising goal was met in February 2013, and beginning Summer 2014, the Simpson Center Digital Humanities Commons will enable UW faculty and graduate students to collaborate with librarians, engineers, and designers in the development, innovation, and exchange of digital research and scholarship.

Simpson Center Initiatives, such as the 2011 Digital Research Summer Institute and the Puget Sounds archives for rare performances of Northwest popular music, are helping to build campus communities of scholarly digital practice.

== Affiliations ==
The Simpson Center maintains affiliations with national and international scholarly organizations, such as the Consortium of Humanities Centers and Institutes; HASTAC (Humanities, Arts, Science, Technology Advanced Collaboratory); Imagining America: Artists and Scholars in Public Life; the National Humanities Alliance; and the Western Humanities Alliance.
