= European Network in Aging Studies =

Research organisation

- Founders: Center for Gender and Diversity; Center for Inter-American Studies; Women, Ageing and Media Research Group; Grup Dedal-Lit; NISAL; German Aging Studies Group
- Headquarters: Graz, Austria
- Methods: Cultural studies, Qualitative research
- Official language: English, German

The European Network in Aging Studies (ENAS) is a research network that connects researchers interested in the study of cultural aging. The parallel network in North America is called the North American Network in Aging Studies. Both networks (ENAS and NANAS) aim to facilitate cooperation among their existing members as well as with new collaborators.

== History ==
ENAS was first established in 2010 within the framework of the project 'Live to be a Hundred: The Cultural Fascination with Longevity'. The European Network in Aging Studies was re-launched as a formal international association at the end of this project. The inaugural ENAS conference was held in 2011 at the University of Maastricht in the Netherlands. Entitled 'Theorizing Age: Challenging the Disciplines', it aimed at building bridges across the circuits of sciences and humanities.

== Mission ==
By facilitating collaboration between researchers and focussing on cultural aging, ENAS contributes to fighting ageism, which has many negative effects (e.g. unsatisfactory intergenerational ties, cumulative negative health effects). Indeed, health research experts state that a humanities expertise is needed to expand current understandings of old age and the impacts of ageism. They explain that organizations like ENAS will help foster such collaborations: "Organizations such as the Gerontological Society of America, the European Network in Aging Studies, and the North American Network in Aging Studies can facilitate interdisciplinary collaboration." The Routledge Handbook of Cultural Gerontology mentions ENAS as an example of the increasing acceptance of transdisciplinarity between literary studies and gerontology. In age studies, ENAS is presented as a way forward to "gather, cluster, and aggregate together the scattered people, ideas, publications, and energies now fomenting scholarly and social change in the aging scene".

=== Cultural aging ===
Cultural age is defined not only as a biological function nor a calendar mark, but also as all the meanings ascribed to categories of age across different places and times. It takes into account the diverse realities of aging including how it intersects with disability, gender, ethnicity, race, sexuality, class, etc. Researchers use narrative, performative, and materiality approaches to study age. For example, they analyze representations (e.g. autobiography, fiction), cultural scripts connected to life stages, as well as the ways people manage the physical changes that come with age.

== Scholarly activities ==
ENAS is a series editor. It produces books about the cultural study of aging. ENAS holds conferences and offers summer schools. Its members collaborate to their partners' projects, for example 'Act your age', a project centered on aging bodies and dance. They have many ongoing projects about the cultural narratives of longevity, the media and identity formation, healthy aging, gender and literature, and online dating.

ENAS is affiliated with the Age, Culture, Humanities journal, which published its first issue in 2014. Age, Culture, Humanities publishes annual scholarly content focusing on aging studies and its intersectionality with adjacent fields of research, including LGBTQIA+ studies. The journal also examines the historiography behind the representation of aging throughout time.

== See also ==
- Ageing studies
- Gerontology
