= Activist ageing =

Activism and research that empowers the elderly

In the field of ageing studies, activist ageing refers to activism and research that empowers the elderly. This approach investigates how ageing is imagined (in mostly Western societies), how ageism operates, and how elders respond to exclusion.

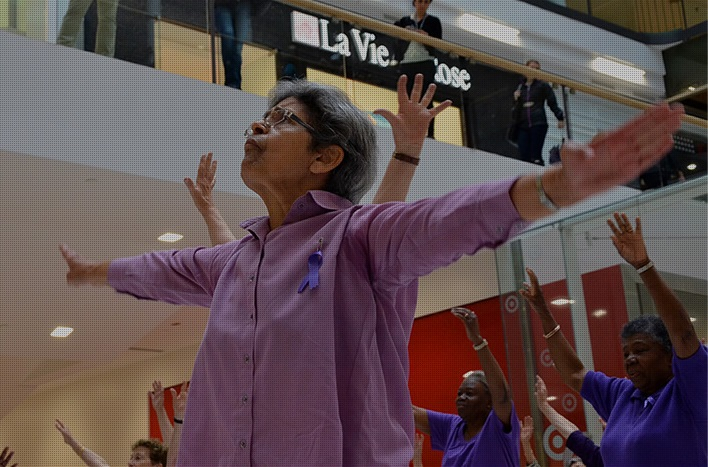
RECAA Flashmob Montreal

Many elders, and especially women, are involved in organizations that aim to effect social change on issues related to ageing or in general. Retirement engenders a form of social exclusion. In this context becoming an activist or a volunteer represents one's agency and participation in social change, outside the market system. Instead of assuming a passive role they act. As elder rights activists and members of community organizations, they try to prevent elder abuse, raise awareness, build resources and networks. Activist ageing is different from active ageing.

== Organizations ==
- Respecting Elders: Communities Against Abuse (RECAA): Aims to raise awareness of elder mistreatment within the ethnocultural communities, using strategies such as forum theatre (acting out situations from the life of elders to stimulate discussion). They participate to events like the World Elder Abuse Awareness Day.
- Raging Grannies: Created in 1987 in British Columbia, they spread across countries. They are social justice activists.
- CARP (Canada): An organization that defends the needs of older Canadians and offer benefits to its members.
- Seniors Action Quebec: Aims to address the living conditions of English-speaking seniors in Quebec and give access to information for an active and healthy aging to its members.

== Ageivism ==
For many years the action around rights of older persons and social activism of older adults was not anchored in a unique ideological framework. It is only in recent years that attempts to frame the global elder rights movement within an ideology began to build up. One such an attempt is the development of Ageivism as an ideology of aging. Ageivism is defined as follows: "Ageivism" refers to an ideology which serves as the basis for calls for social action (echoing similar "isms", e.g. feminism, or socialism) on the protection and promotion of the rights of older persons based on the grounds of political, social and economic principles of identity, dignity and social justice.

== Mediatization ==
Canadian governmental services offered through various Internet portals require greater technological skills from the part of elders, who need to comply in order to get information about their rights or specific programs. The development of digital technologies forces activists and community organizations to consider including media in their actions. Many organizations use digital technologies to contact other organizations at a distance, to document their organization's history and actions, and to develop intergenerational ties. Contrary to popular discourses that represent the elderly as passive and dependent, their uses of digital media show their agency and ability to produce media content. Other kinds of projects also aim to enhance digital literacy among elders, such as the workshops taking place at the Atwater Library in Montreal.

== See also ==
- Elder rights
- Intergenerational equity
