= Kathleen Woodward =

American academic

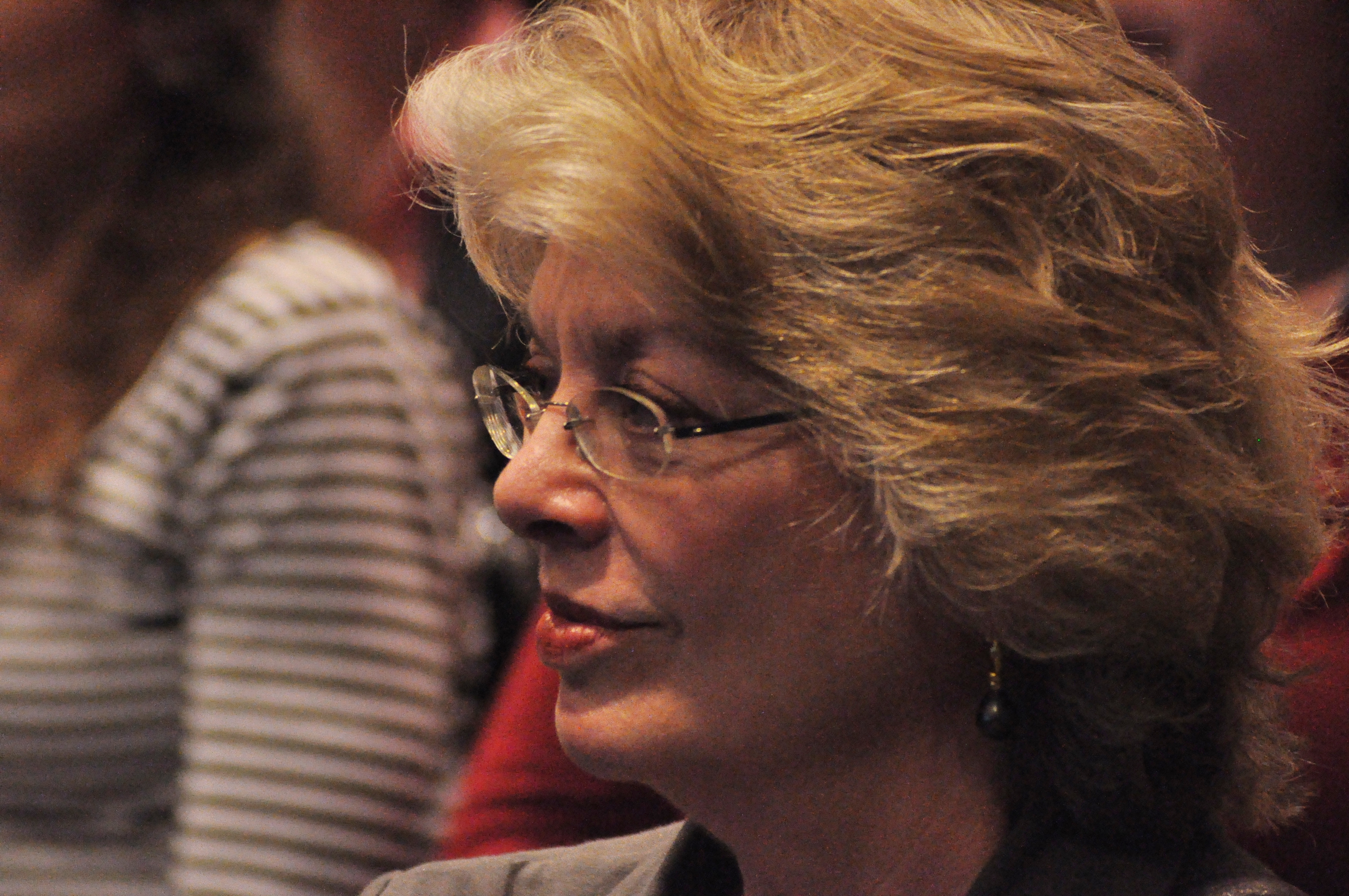
Kathleen Woodward in 2010

Kathleen Woodward (born Kathleen Middlekauff) is an American academic, literary and cultural critic, and higher education leader. She is Lockwood Professor in the Humanities and Professor of English at the University of Washington. She served as Director of the Walter Chapin Simpson Center for the Humanities from 2000 to 2025, where she spearheaded initiatives in interdisciplinary research, digital humanities, public scholarship, and reimagining doctoral education. Woodward’s scholarship spans twentieth-century American literature and culture, the discourse of emotions, age studies, gender and sexuality, technology and science studies, and the public role of the humanities.

== Education ==
Woodward earned her Bachelor of Arts in Economics, graduating magna cum laude from Smith College in 1966. She then pursued graduate studies in literature, completing her Ph.D. at the University of California, San Diego in 1976. Her educational foundation in economics and literature has informed her interdisciplinary approach to cultural analysis and the humanities more broadly.

== Career ==
Woodward began her academic career as a lecturer at the Université d’Aix-Marseille in France in 1970. She joined the University of Wisconsin-Milwaukee in 1974 as a lecturer and progressed through the ranks to Assistant Professor, Associate Professor, and Professor of English. From 1981 to 2000, she served as Director of the Center for Twentieth Century Studies, one of the oldest humanities research centers in the United States. There, she organized, with faculty, year-long thematic research programs that integrated faculty fellows, visiting scholars, conferences, graduate courses, and publications, significantly elevating the center’s national and international profile. During this period, she also served as a Visiting Scholar at the Institute for the Humanities at the University of Michigan in 1996 and as a Visiting Professor at the École des Hautes Études en Sciences Sociales in Paris in 1991.

In 2000, Woodward was appointed Director of the Walter Chapin Simpson Center for the Humanities at the University of Washington. During her 25-year tenure, she oversaw transformative growth in research infrastructure, crossdisciplinary collaboration, and graduate education, establishing the center as a leading hub for the digital humanities, public scholarship, and innovation in doctoral education. Under her leadership, the center expanded its funding base through major grants from the National Endowment for the Humanities, the Andrew W. Mellon Foundation, the Rockefeller Foundation, and other institutions, supporting faculty and graduate student research, postdoctoral fellows, and community-engaged projects.

Woodward initiated summer fellowships for faculty to complete book manuscripts, supported collaborative research clusters, and launched the Institute on Public Humanities for doctoral students, which evolved into the Certificate in Public Scholarship. She also facilitated programs aimed at public engagement, including Teachers as Scholars and Wednesday University, bringing humanities learning to K-12 educators and community audiences. Through these initiatives, Woodward positioned the Simpson Center as a model for integrating research, teaching, and public outreach in the humanities.

=== National and Professional Leadership ===
From 1995 to 2001, she served as President of the Consortium of Humanities Centers and Institutes (CHCI), expanding its membership and international scope, securing Rockefeller Foundation funding, and establishing infrastructure for global collaboration among humanities centers. She served on the Board of Directors of the American Association of Colleges & Universities from 2018 to 2022, chairing the Frederick W. Ness Award for scholarship on liberal education since 2019. In the Modern Language Association, she was a member of the Executive Council from 2009 to 2013 and served on task forces on doctoral education and the status of women in the profession. From 2012 to 2018, Woodward was a Senator-at-Large and Executive Board member of Phi Beta Kappa, advocating for broad-based liberal arts education.

She was the founding chair of the Advisory Board of Imagining America: Artists and Scholars in Public Life, a consortium dedicated to advancing the civic purposes of the humanities and arts. Woodward also served on the Board of Directors of the National Humanities Alliance and the steering committee of HASTAC, promoting crossdisciplinary collaboration involving computing, communication, and the humanities.

== Scholarship and writings ==
Woodward’s scholarship is characterized by its interdisciplinary scope, integrating literary criticism with cultural theory, age studies, emotions research, and science and technology studies. She is the author of Statistical Panic: Cultural Politics and Poetics of the Emotions (2009), which examines the intersection of emotional discourse and cultural production in postwar America, and Aging and Its Discontents: Freud and Other Fictions (1991), which explores narratives of aging through literary and psychoanalytic lenses. Her early work includes At Last, the Real Distinguished Thing: The Late Poems of Eliot, Pound, Stevens, and Williams (1980), a critical analysis of late modernist American poetry. Woodward has also edited influential collections, including Figuring Age: Women, Bodies, Generations (1999), Memory and Desire: Aging—Literature—Psychoanalysis (1986), and The Myths of Information: Technology and Postindustrial Culture (1980), bringing together original essays by leading scholars in cultural studies, literary theory, and technology studies.

== Personal life ==
Woodward married journalist Bob Woodward, her high school sweetheart, shortly after graduating from Smith in 1966. They divorced in 1969. She married Herbert Blau, theoretician of performance and director, in 1980. Their daughter was born in 1982.

== Works ==
=== Books ===
- Woodward, Kathleen. Statistical Panic: Cultural Politics and Poetics of the Emotions. Duke University Press, 2009. ISBN 9780822343547.
- Woodward, Kathleen. Aging and Its Discontents: Freud and Other Fictions. Indiana University Press, 1991. ISBN 9780253366405.
- Woodward, Kathleen. At Last, the Real Distinguished Thing: The Late Poems of Eliot, Pound, Stevens, and Williams. The Ohio State University Press, 1980. ISBN 9780814203064.

==== Edited books ====
- Woodward, Kathleen, ed. Figuring Age: Women, Bodies, Generations. Indiana University Press, 1999. ISBN 9780253212368.
- Woodward, Kathleen, ed. The Myths of Information: Technology and Postindustrial Culture. University of Wisconsin Press, 1980. ISBN 9780930956134.
- Woodward, Kathleen, and Schwartz, Murray, eds. Memory and Desire: Aging—-Literature-—Psychoanalysis. Indiana University Press, 1986. ISBN 9780253303004.
- Woodward, Kathleen, De Lauretis, Teresa, and Huyssen, Andreas, eds. The Technological Imagination: Theories and Fictions. Coda Press, 1980. ISBN 9780930956103.
- Woodward, Kathleen, Spicker, Stuart, and Van Tassel, David, eds. Aging and the Elderly: Humanistic Perspectives in Gerontology. Humanities Press, 1978. ISBN 9780391005594.

=== Selected essays ===
- "Late Theory, Late Style: Loss and Renewal in Freud and Barthes". Aging & Gender in Literature: Studies in Creativity, ed. Anne Wyatt-Brown and Janice Rossen (Charlottesville: University of Virginia Press, 1993): 82–101.
- "Tribute to the Older Woman: Psychoanalysis, Feminism, and Ageism". Images of Aging: Cultural Representations of Later Life, ed. Mike Featherstone and Andrew Werrick (London: Routledge, 1995): 79–96.
- "Anger…and Anger: From Freud to Feminism". Freud and the Passions, ed. John O'Neill (University Park: Pennsylvania UP, 1996): 73–95.
- "Telling Stories, Aging, Reminiscence and the Life Review". Doreen B. Townsend Center Occasional Papers 9 (Doreen B Townsend Center for the Humanities, UC Berkeley, 1997)
- "Statistical Panic". differences 11.2 (1999): 177–203.
- "Traumatic Shame: Toni Morrison, Televisual Culture, and the Cultural Politics of the Emotions". Cultural Critique 46 (Fall, 2002): 210–40.
- "Calculating Compassion". Indiana Law Journal 77.2 (2002): 223–45.
- "Against Wisdom: The Social Politics of Anger and Aging". Cultural Critique 51 (Spring 2002): 186–218.
- "A Feeling for the Cyborg". In Data Made Flesh: Embodying Information, eds. Robert Mitchell and Phillip Thurtle (New York: Routledge, 2004): 181–197.
- "Performing Age, Performing Gender". NWSA Journal 18.1 (2006): 162–189.
- "The Future of the Humanities- in the present & in public". Daedalus 138 (Winter 2009): 110–123.
- "Introduction: Thinking Feeling, Feeling Thinking". In Statistical Panic: Cultural Politics and Poetics of the Emotions. Durham: Duke University Press, 2009.
- "Assisted Living: Aging, Old Age, Memory, Aesthetics". Occasion 4 (May 2012):http://occasion.stanford.edu/node/104.
- "Work-Work Balance, Metrics, and Resetting the Balance". PMLA 127.4 (2012): 994–1000.
- "A Public Secret: Assisted Living, Caregivers, Globalization". International Journal of Ageing and Later Life 7.2 (2012):17-51.
- "Aging". In Adams, Rachel; Reiss, Benjamin; Serlin, David. Key Words for Disability Studies. New York: New York University Press. pp. 33–34. ISBN 978-1-4798-4115-8. (2015)
- When Does Old Become Too Old?” (Forum: “Too Old for the Job?”), Age, Culture, Humanities, April 2024.
- “Emotion,” Keywords for Health Humanities, ed. Jonathan Metzl, Sari Altschuler, and Priscilla Wald (New York: New York UP, 2023).
- “’Old Trees Are Our Parents’: Old Growth, New Kin, Forest Time,” Age, Culture, Humanities, December 2022.
- “The Feeling of Freedom, Planetary Affect, and Feminist Emotion: Recent Work by Video Artist Cecelia Condit,” special issue on affect of Feminist Media Histories 7.2 (Spring 2021): 65-91.
- “Ageing in the Anthropocene: The View from and beyond Margaret Drabble’s The Dark Flood Rises,” Ageing in Literature, ed. Elizabeth Barry (Woodbridge: Boydell and Brewer, 2020), pp. 37-63.
- “Literary Antidotes to the Toxin That Is Ageism,” Studies in American Fiction 46.2 (2019): 375-383.
- “On Feminist Collaboration, Digital Media, and Affect,” in Feminist Interventions in Participatory Media: Pedagogy, Publics, Practice, ed. Ron Krabill and Lauren Berliner (New York: Routledge, 2018) 70-90.
- “We Are All Non-Traditional Learners Now: Community Colleges, Long-Life Learning, and Problem- Solving Humanities,” A New Deal for the Humanities: Liberal Arts and the Future of Public Higher Education, ed. Gordon Hutner and Feisal Mohamed (New Brunswick: Rutgers UP, 2016) 51-71.
- “Feeling Frail and National Statistical Panic: Joan Didion in Blue Nights and the American Economy at Risk,” Age, Culture, Humanities 2 (2015): 347-67.
