= Ageing studies =

Field of theoretically, politically and empirically engaged cultural analysis

Ageing studies (or age studies) is a field of theoretically, politically, and empirically engaged cultural analysis that has been developed by scholars from many different disciplines. In recent years, the field of ageing studies has flourished, with a growing number of scholars paying attention to the cultural implications of population ageing.

== History and description of the field ==
Aging studies break from the traditional field of gerontology by highlighting how biological ageing is mediated by cultural construction, and by emphasising the self-representations of the elderly. The first issue of the academic journal Age, Culture, Humanities includes many essays that address the "coming of age" of this field, in which Stephen Katz draws a contrast between the current state of age studies and that of gender studies.

Aging, or age studies is an interdisciplinary field, which can be affiliated with the wider approaches found in cultural studies, gender studies, media and film studies, consumer culture, business and economics etc. Researchers working in this field interrogate the cultural discourses, habits, attitudes, laws, and practices that construct the meanings of growing older, "aging." For example, they invoke calculations of age, asking at what age someone is considered "old" (fifty? sixty?) and referring to the social practice of trying to figure out someone's age. They investigate how public expressions of ageing in the West, such as representations of old age in the news, films and television, create limited views of old age, therefore leading to ageism, a general lack of awareness of diversity, and intergenerational misunderstandings and divisions. Within this perspective, ageing is understood not merely as a biological state, but as a lived experience, embodied and mediated, occurring within specific material and social circumstances. Research in this field is primarily conducted through methodologies associated with the social sciences and the humanities.

== Notable books in the field ==
- Margaret M. Gullette was the first to call for Age studies in the 1990s. She challenges the decline narratives predominantly circulating on ageing (e.g. physical decline, social disdain) in her book Aged by Culture.
- In Learning to be old: Gender, culture, and ageing, Margaret Cruikshank addresses cultural myths about age, including fears, traditions, and the medicalisation of ageing, and suggests a methodology centered on peers.
- In Figuring Age: Women, Bodies, Generations, Kathleen Woodward explores why women are moved to the periphery of society as they age. She questions the relationship between age and the body, and age and interpersonal relationships.
- Andrew Blaikie focuses on ageing in Britain. In Ageing and Popular Culture, he traces a genealogy of the interplay between state and medical discourses of ageing, popularly circulating imagery (especially photography), and lived experience.
- La Vieillesse (The Coming of Age) by Simone de Beauvoir can also be seen as a precursor to the field.

== Academic organisations ==
Research centres and networks:

- The European Network in Aging Studies (ENAS) was founded in 2010 and its mission is to facilitate international collaboration in the study of cultural ageing.
- Women, Ageing and Media (WAM) was founded in 2010 and its members study the relationship between older women and popular media (e.g. popular music, fashion).
- The North American Network in Aging Studies (NANAS) was established in 2013 and is the North American version of ENAS. Its goal is to critically examine older age.
- Ageing + Communication + Technology (ACT) was established in 2014. Its members engage with three areas of investigation: Agency, which involves communities in the development of projects to enhance agency; Critical mediations, which critically examines the mediated cultural experiences of adults in later life; and Telecommunication technologies, which address ageing in the context of networked societies.
- The Ageing, Body, Society study group (ABS) is affiliated with the British Sociological Association and it aims to bring together work across a range of approaches pertaining to the body in old age.
- The Center for Interdisciplinary Research on Aging and Care (CIRAC) at the University of Graz, Austria, was established in 2021. It was created to address socially relevant questions of ageing, old age, and the organization of care (care structures and care cultures) from the perspectives of the humanities and social sciences.

Journals:

- Age, Culture, Humanities publishes articles from the humanities and the arts.
- The Journal of Ageing Studies welcomes work from the social and behavioural sciences and the humanities.

== See also ==
- Activist ageing
- Ageism
- Elder abuse
- Sexuality in older age
- Successful ageing
