= Meine Oma fährt im Hühnerstall Motorrad =

German song

"Meine Oma fährt im Hühnerstall Motorrad" ("My grandma drives her motorcycle in the chicken coop")) is a German humoristic song. It dates back to the 1930s, probably stemming from two older works: the refrain of the Rheinländer dance "Wir versaufen unsrer Oma ihr klein Häuschen", authored by Robert Steidl in 1922, constitutes most of the melody, while the text is a variation of the foxtrott "Meine Oma fährt Motorrad, ohne Bremse, ohne Licht" ("my grand-mother rides a motorcycle without brakes nor lighting"), a 1928 work with words by Ernst Albert and music by Erwin Bolt.

== Origins and variants ==
The Deutsches Volksliedarchiv (German archives of popular songs) have conducted extensive research into the origin of the song. They describe it as "an instance of absurd humour, as well as a typical example of the songs that developed in parallel to the media musical culture of the 20th century, constantly mutating under their own dynamic." (Note: German: Es ist ein Spiegelbild des spielerischen Vergnügens am Absurden und zugleich ein typisches und virulentes Beispiel für jenes Liedgut, das sich parallel zur medial geprägten Musikkultur des 20. Jahrhunderts entwickelt und mit einer gewissen Eigendynamik beständig verändert.) When exactly the two works mixed is not known. The earliest known instance is an incipit in a magazine containing the words of the song in 1935 or 1936. The earliest document held by the Deutsches Volksliedarchiv dates from 1942.

=== 1958 version ===
In 1958, "Meine Oma fährt im Hühnerstall Motorrad" was printed for the first time in a songbook, Der Zündschlüssel, by the Fidula-Verlag printing company, from the recollection of editor Johannes Holzmeister.

1. Meine Oma fährt im Hühnerstall Motorrad, Motorrad, Motorrad,
meine Oma fährt im Hühnerstall Motorrad,
meine Oma ist 'ne ganz patente Frau.

2. Meine Oma hat im hohlen Zahn ein Radio ...
3. Meine Oma hat 'nen Nachttopf mit Beleuchtung ...
4. Meine Oma hat 'ne Glatze mit Geländer ...
5. Meine Oma hat 'ne Brille mit Gardinen ...
6. Meine Oma hat 'nen Pet[t]icoat aus Wellblech ...
7. Meine Oma hat im Strumpfband 'nen Revolver ...
8. Denn meine Oma spielt in Hollywood 'nen Cowboy ...

=== 1980 version ===
In 1980, Fredrik Vahle published a 25-stanza version in Liederspatz, where the grandma sits behind the wheel, watches the TV series Tagesschau, and goes to the disco.

== 2019 WDR parody ==
In 2019, Westdeutscher Rundfunk (WDR) had a new version sung by the children choir of the Choral Academy of Dortmund, authored by one of the hosts of WDR-2 as a caricature of intergenerational tensions. The new version appeared on 27 December 2019 on an online video. The file was removed shortly thereafter, following criticism of the refrain that states "My grand-mother is an old environmental pig" (in original German: Meine Oma ist 'ne alte Umweltsau). However, the video remains available from YouTube. The next day, in a special broadcast on WDR, Tom Buhrow and the head of programmes Jochen Rausch apologised without reserve for the video, which he called a "mistake". The choir director, Zeljo Davutovic, issued a statement praising the youth movement Fridays for Future, commenting "this is not about grand-mothers, this is about all of us."

On 29 December, right-wing groups started demonstrating in front of the WDR headquarters in protest of the song. Counter-protests by left-wing groups soon followed, as well as a police presence. In total, around 100 people were involved.

== Notes and references ==
Notes
