= Granny Peace Brigade =

American anti-war demonstration group

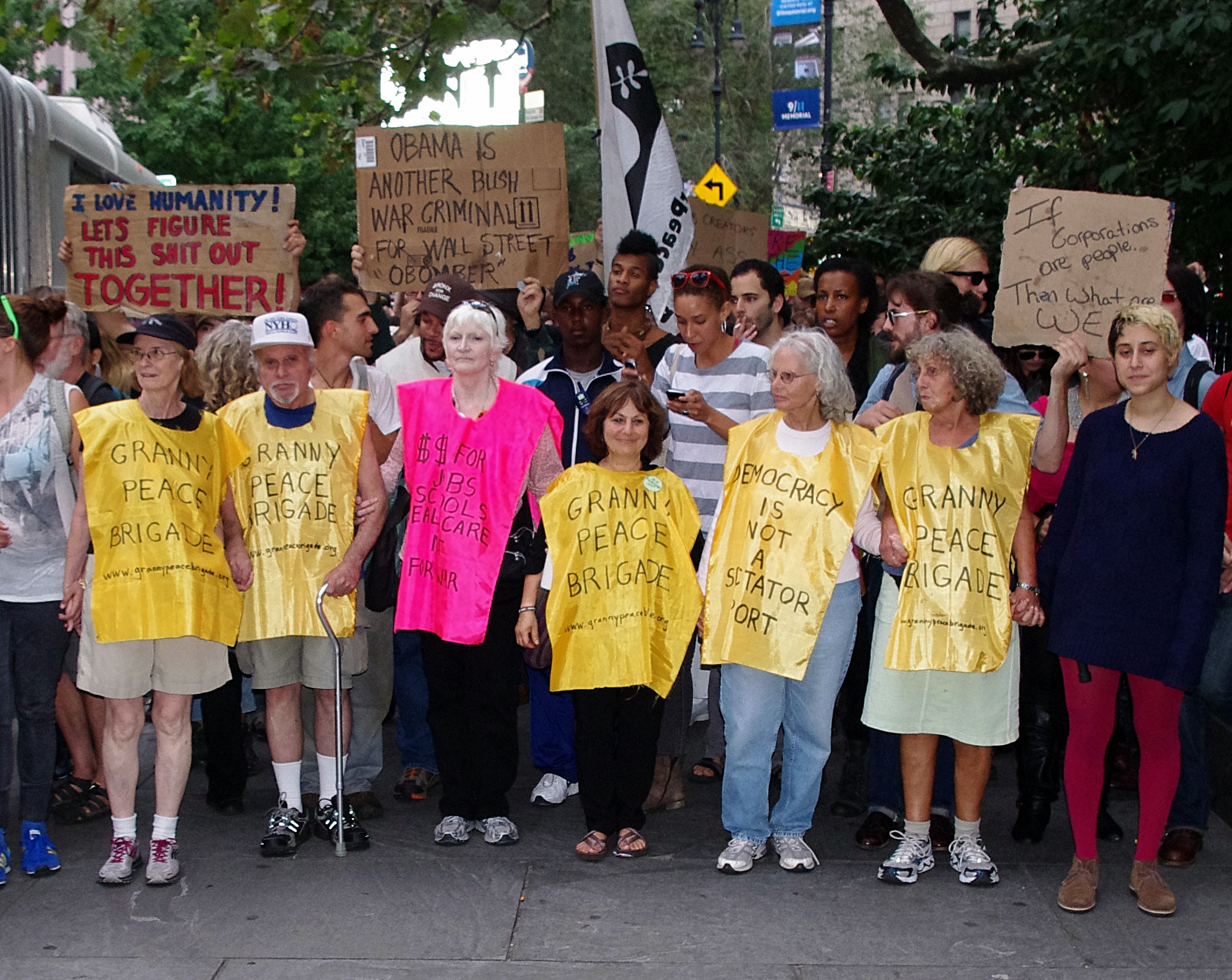
Granny Peace Brigade at Occupy Wall Street, October 2011

The Granny Peace Brigade (GPB) is an active anti-war demonstration group in New York City made up of older women dedicated to the goal of peace with justice domestically and globally. The GPB frequently collaborates with Code Pink, The Raging Grannies and Peace Action and is one of many local activist groups seeking a safe and peaceful world for all people, especially children.

Arrested on October 17, 2005, and later acquitted for attempting to enlist in the military at the recruitment center in Times Square, the GPB works on such initiatives as counter-recruitment (preventing military recruiters from entering public schools), opposition to militarization on a global scale, social networking for phone-a-thons (enabling the public to voice their opinions to elected officials by phone), Teach-Ins (discussing the problems created by U.S. military bases around the world), anti-Drone work (resolution sent to the City Council and street actions on the ban of surveillance and weaponized drones), No War Toys actions at holiday time, anti-Occupation actions(Palestine)and education on how we want our taxes used (Ms.Gizmo), and direct action at military bases, corporate and government offices.

== History ==
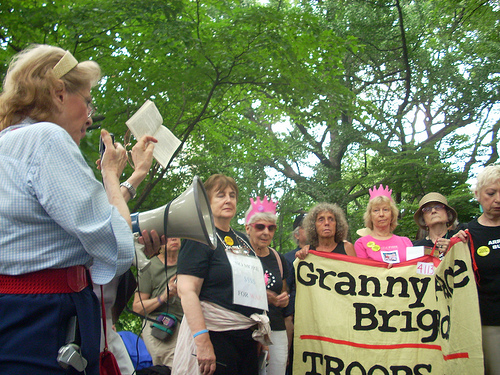
The Granny Peace Brigade, Central Park, New York City, 2008

The Grannies were initially formed when a group of women, members of seven groups [see below], approached military recruiters and demanded to be sent to Iraq in order to replace young people who were used as cannon fodder by the US military. The Granny Peace Brigade name was adopted for identification purposes after the women decided to continue working together as a group.

Groups that formed the GPB include:

- Code Pink
- Grandmothers Against the War
- Gray Panthers
- Peace Action of New York State (PANYS)
- Raging Grannies
- The Ribbon International
- West Side Peace Action
- Women's International League for Peace and Freedom

== See also ==
- Cindy Sheehan
