= Raging Grannies =

Activist groups of older women

The Raging Grannies
- Formation: 1986
- Type: Activist organization
- Website: raginggrannies.org

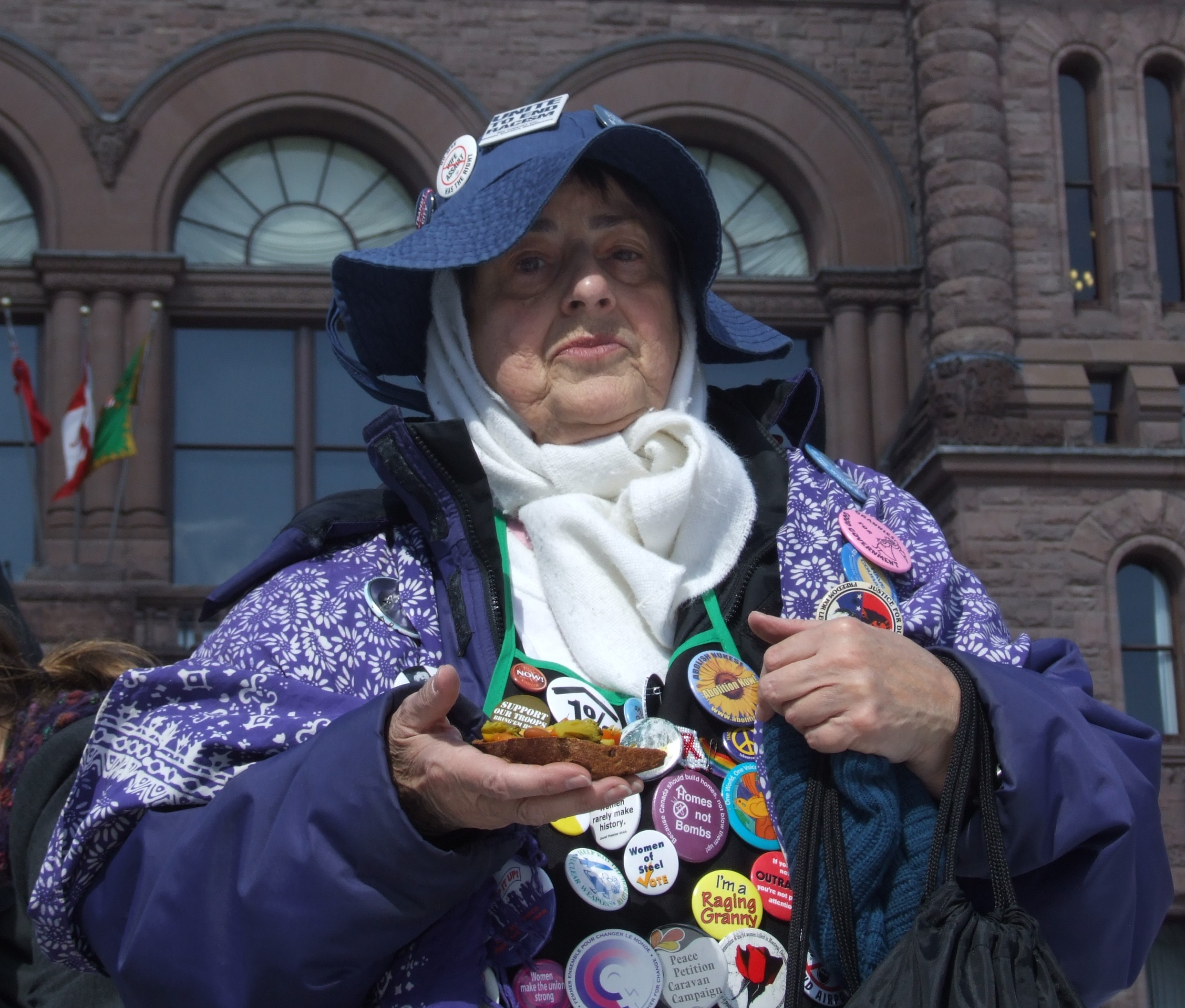
A Raging Granny in Toronto

The Raging Grannies (or just "Raging Grannies") are activist organizations in many cities and towns in Canada, the United States, and other countries. The first group started in Victoria, British Columbia, Canada, in 1986–87.

They are social justice activists, all women old enough to be grandmothers, who dress up in clothes that mock stereotypes of older women, and sing songs at protests. They typically write the lyrics themselves, putting their political messages to the tunes of well-known songs.

They were allegedly spied upon by a unit of the California National Guard after it organized a Mother's Day anti-war rally. Their activism includes peace and environmental causes.

There are two books about them: Off Our Rockers, by Alison Acker and Betty Brightwell, and The Raging Grannies: Wild Hats, Cheeky Songs and Witty Actions for a Better World.

== History ==
The first group started in Victoria, British Columbia, Canada, over the winter of 1986–87. They originally called themselves "NERT—Nuclear Emergency Response Team". The members believed the presence of US Navy nuclear-powered ships' presence in Victoria Harbour posed potential health and environmental risks to the city.

== Notable events ==
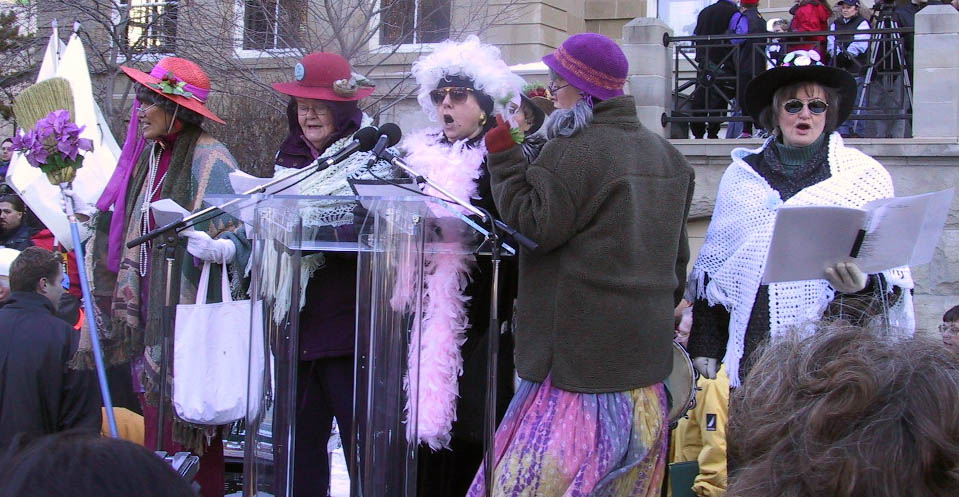
The Calgary Raging Grannies performing in 2002

In May 2005, a California chapter of the Raging Grannies was allegedly spied upon by a unit of the California National Guard after it organized a Mother's Day anti-war rally. California State Senator Joe Dunn launched an investigation and the intelligence unit was subsequently shut down.

In July 2005, five members of the group were charged with trespassing after they attempted to enlist at a US Army recruiting center in Tucson, Arizona. A spokesperson for the group said they wanted to enlist and be sent to Iraq so that their children and grandchildren could come home. A group also went to New York City, where they were arrested for allegedly blocking access to a recruitment center in Times Square; on April 28, 2006, they were acquitted of all charges.

The Action League of the San Francisco Bay Area Peninsula, as the group is known in the Bay Area, was the subject of the 2009 video documentary Raging Grannies.

The Raging Grannies were also part of the "March against Monsanto" protest on May 25, 2013, to protest against genetically modified foods.

The original Grannies were honoured on their 30th anniversary with a display at the Canadian Museum for Human Rights in Winnipeg, MB.

In June 2020, the Raging Grannies protested to show their support for the Black Lives Matter movement in Portland, Oregon and in San Bruno and Palo Alto, California.

The Raging Grannies have also been very active in the 2022 abortion rights protests across the United States.

== Works about the Raging Grannies ==
At least two films, Granny Power and Two Raging Grannies, and multiple academic articles, talk about the Raging Grannies. They state and show how they challenge stereotypical conceptions about activism and aging (the grannies did not grow more conservative as they aged, for example). There are two books about them: Off Our Rockers, by Alison Acker and Betty Brightwell, and The Raging Grannies: Wild Hats, Cheeky Songs, and Witty Actions for a Better World, by Carole Roy.

== See also ==
- Activist Ageing
- Betty Krawczyk
- Code Pink
- Gray Panthers
- Granny Peace Brigade
- Harriet Nahanee
- Radical cheerleading
