= James Chandler (academic) =

James Chandler (born January 17, 1948) is the director of the Franke Institute for the Humanities and holds the Barbara E. & Richard J. Franke Professorship in English Language and Literature at the University of Chicago. He was previously the George M. Pullman Professor in English Language & Literature at the same institution.

Chandler is the author of three books on English Romanticism: Wordsworth's Second Nature (1984), England in 1819: The Politics of Literary Culture and the Case of Romantic Historicism, which won the 2000 Gordon J. Laing Award for distinction in academic publishing, and An Archeology of Sympathy: The Sentimental Mode in Literature and Cinema (2013), which examines continuities between the Romantic culture of sentiment and twentieth-century film.

In 2024, Chandler was made an honorary member of the Royal Irish Academy.
