= Diacritics (journal) =

Journal

- Discipline: Literature, literary criticism
- Language: English
- Edited by: Andrea Bachner

Publication details
- History: 1971–present
- Publisher: Johns Hopkins University Press on behalf of Cornell University Department of Romance Studies (United States)
- Frequency: Quarterly

Standard abbreviations
- ISO 4: Diacritics

Indexing
- ISSN: 0300-7162 (print); 1080-6539 (web)
- LCCN: 76645621
- JSTOR: 03007162
- OCLC no.: 31870435

Links
- Journal homepage; Journal page at publisher's website; Journal page at Project MUSE

Diacritics is a quarterly peer-reviewed academic journal established in 1971 at Cornell University and published by the Johns Hopkins University Press. Articles serve to review recent literature in the field of literary criticism, and have covered topics in gender studies, political theory, psychoanalysis, queer theory, and other areas. The editor-in-chief is Andrea Bachner (Cornell University).

== History ==
The journal was founded by David Grossvogel, who served as the Romance Studies chair at Cornell. Its first issue was published in the Fall of 1971, and Grossvogel served as editor until 1976.

The name “Diacritics” was suggested by Romance Studies professor emeritus Philip Lewis, who served from 1971 to 1987 as managing and general editor.
